= List of marine aquarium fish species =

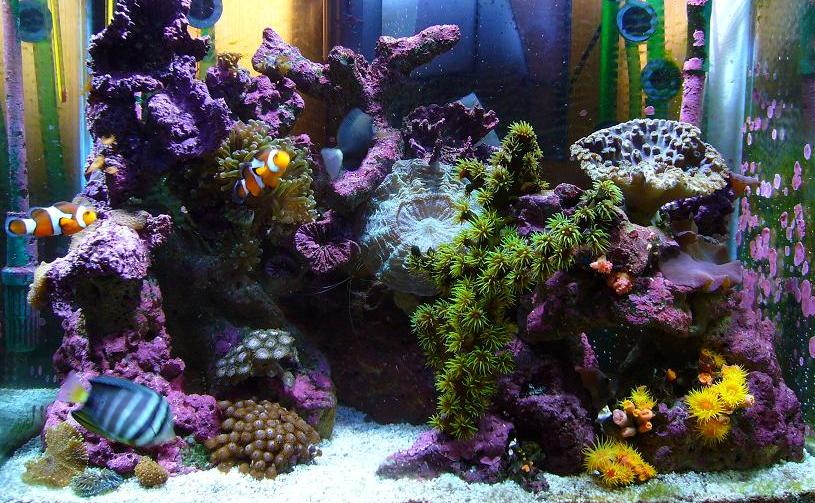
Two clownfish and two tangs in a reef aquarium

The following list of marine aquarium fish species commonly available in the aquarium trade is not a completely comprehensive list; certain rare specimens may be available commercially but not yet listed here. A brief section on each, with a link to the page about the particular species is provided along with references for further information.

Reef-safe fish do not consume corals or invertebrates, while fish categorized as not safe do. Fish labelled as "with caution" may have individuals within the species that could potentially eat invertebrates or cause damage to corals.

== Angelfish (large) ==
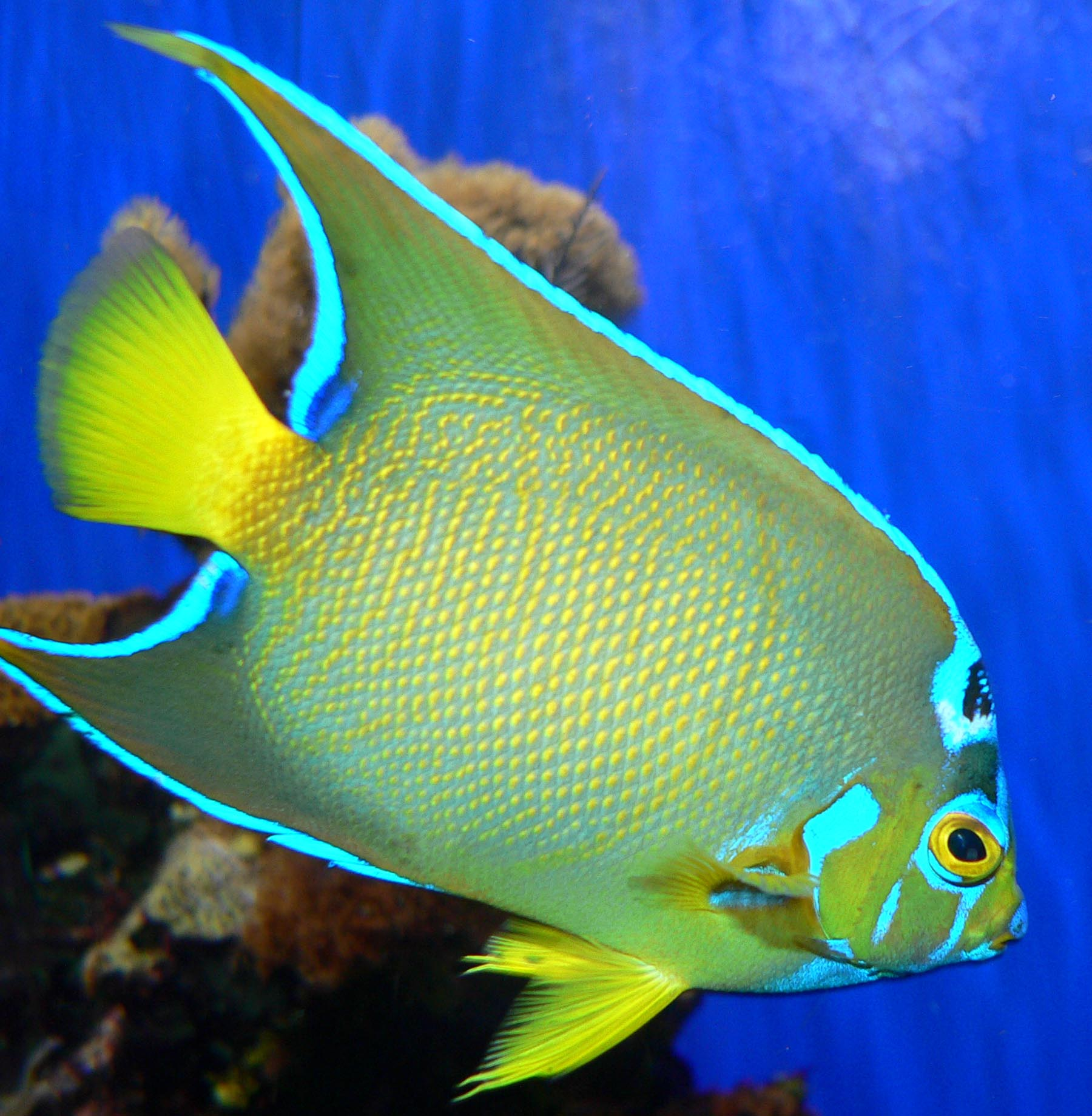
Queen angelfish

These large fish are considered to be quite hardy, but because of their size may present a significant challenge to the keeper. They need huge aquariums, up to 180 gallons to house one for its entire lifespan. Two angels might be kept in the same aquarium provided it is a large aquarium, they are properly acclimated as juveniles, and they have very different colouring and body shape. However, because all Angelfish have essentially the same diet, mixing them is a feat that should be left to only advanced keepers. Most are not reef safe, and a potential owner should be aware that they need to have plenty of vegetable matter in their diet. They undergo major changes in colouration while maturing, and unless specified given descriptions are for adult specimens.

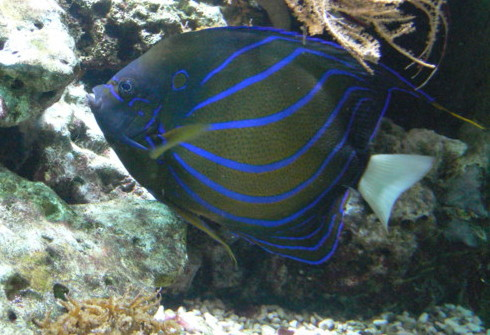
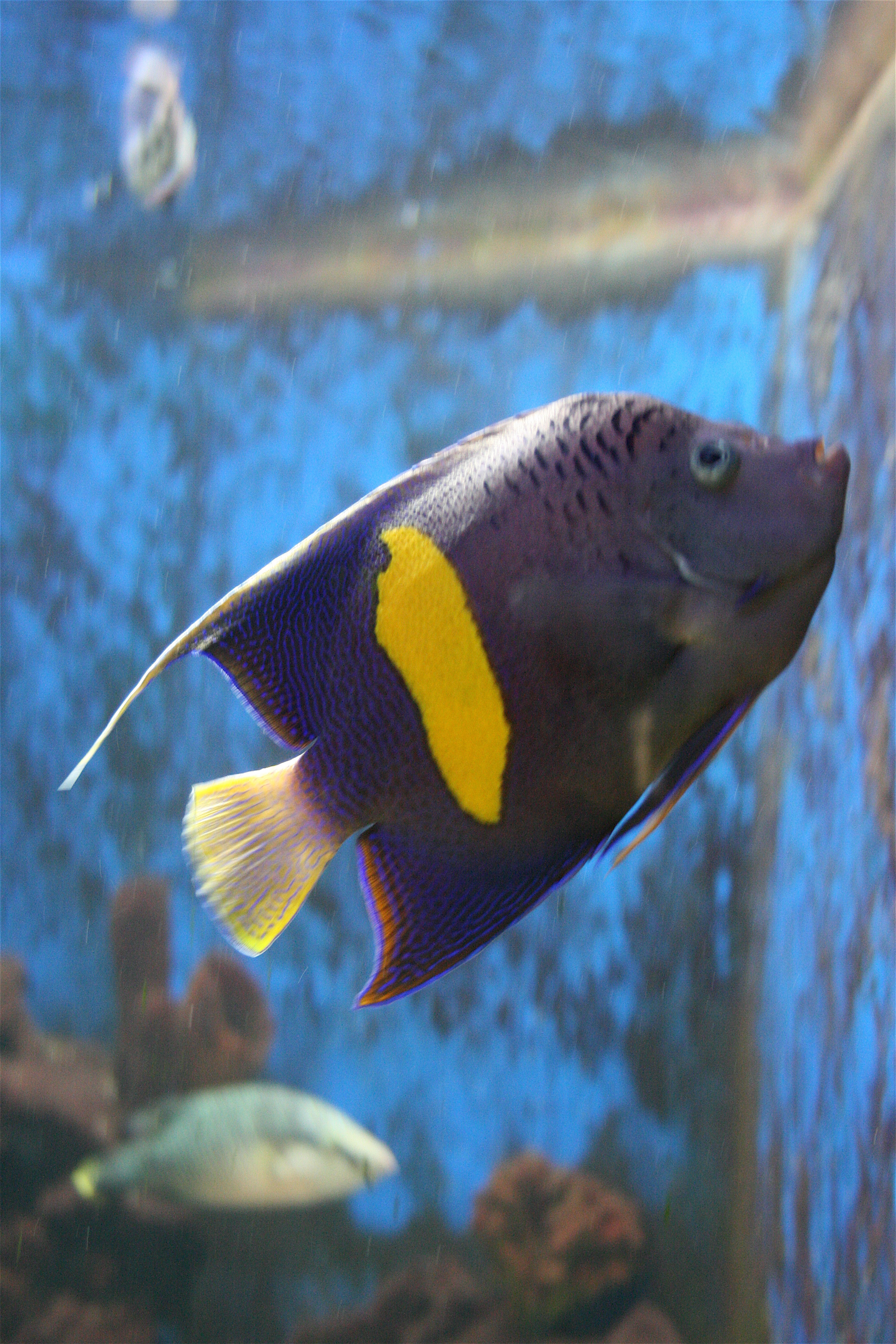
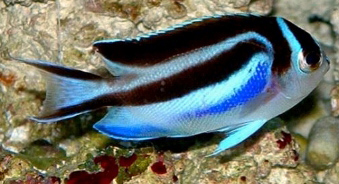
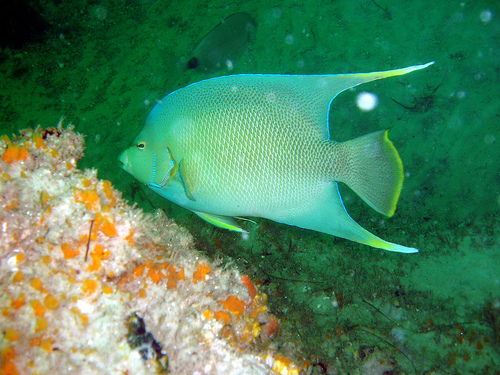
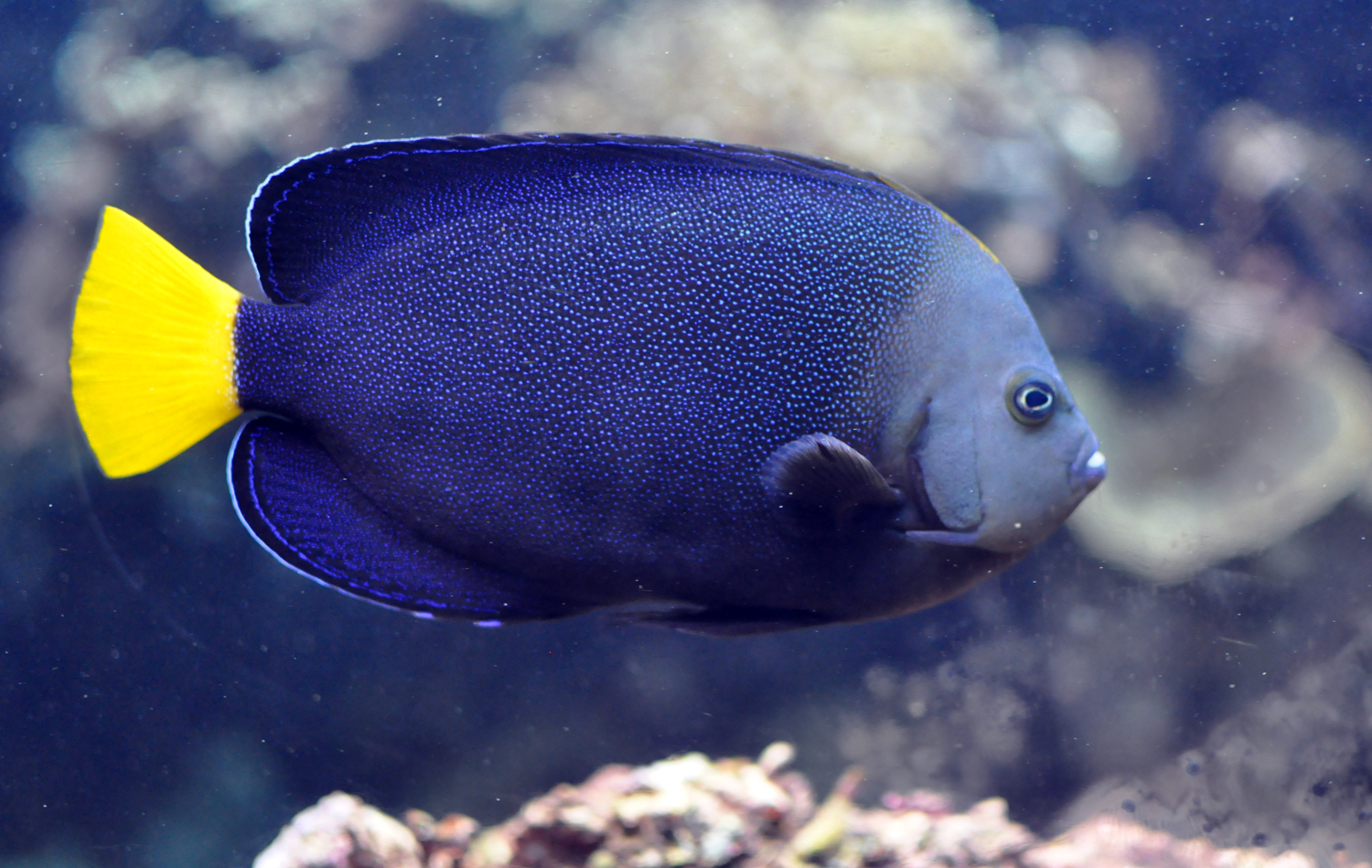
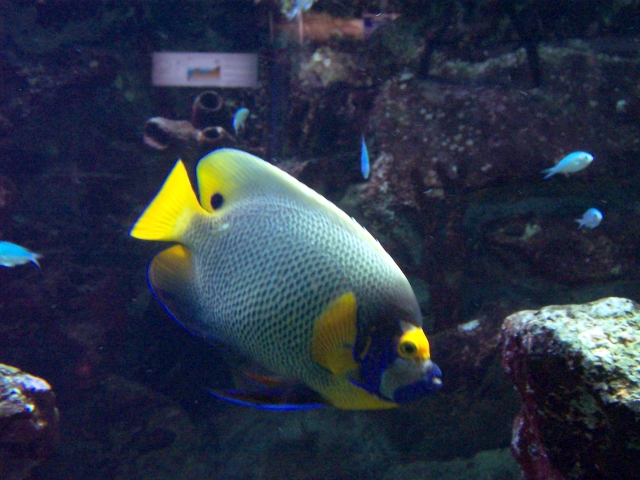
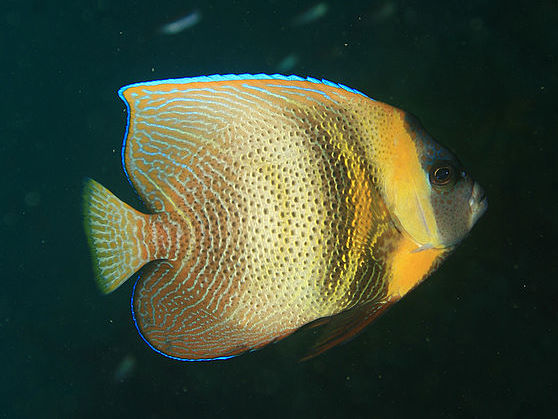
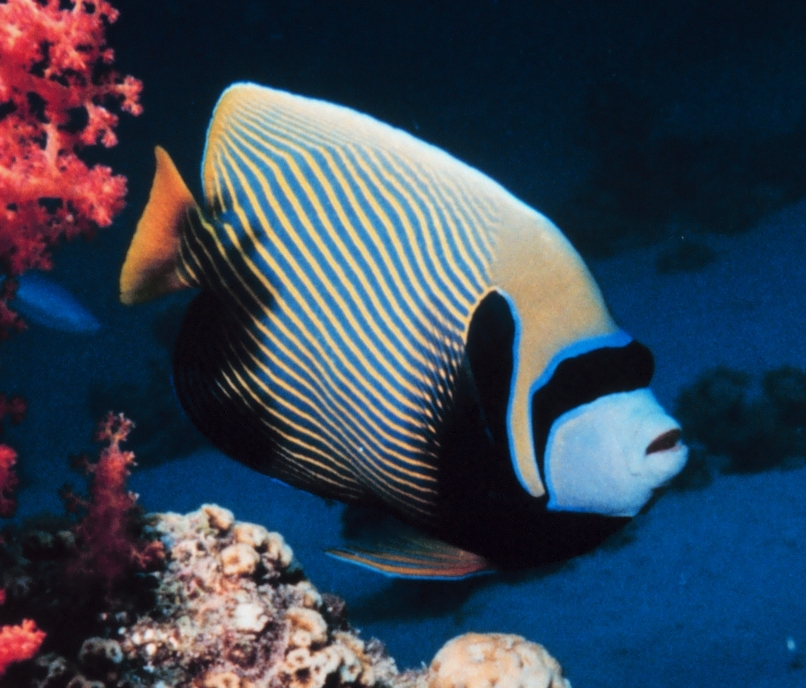
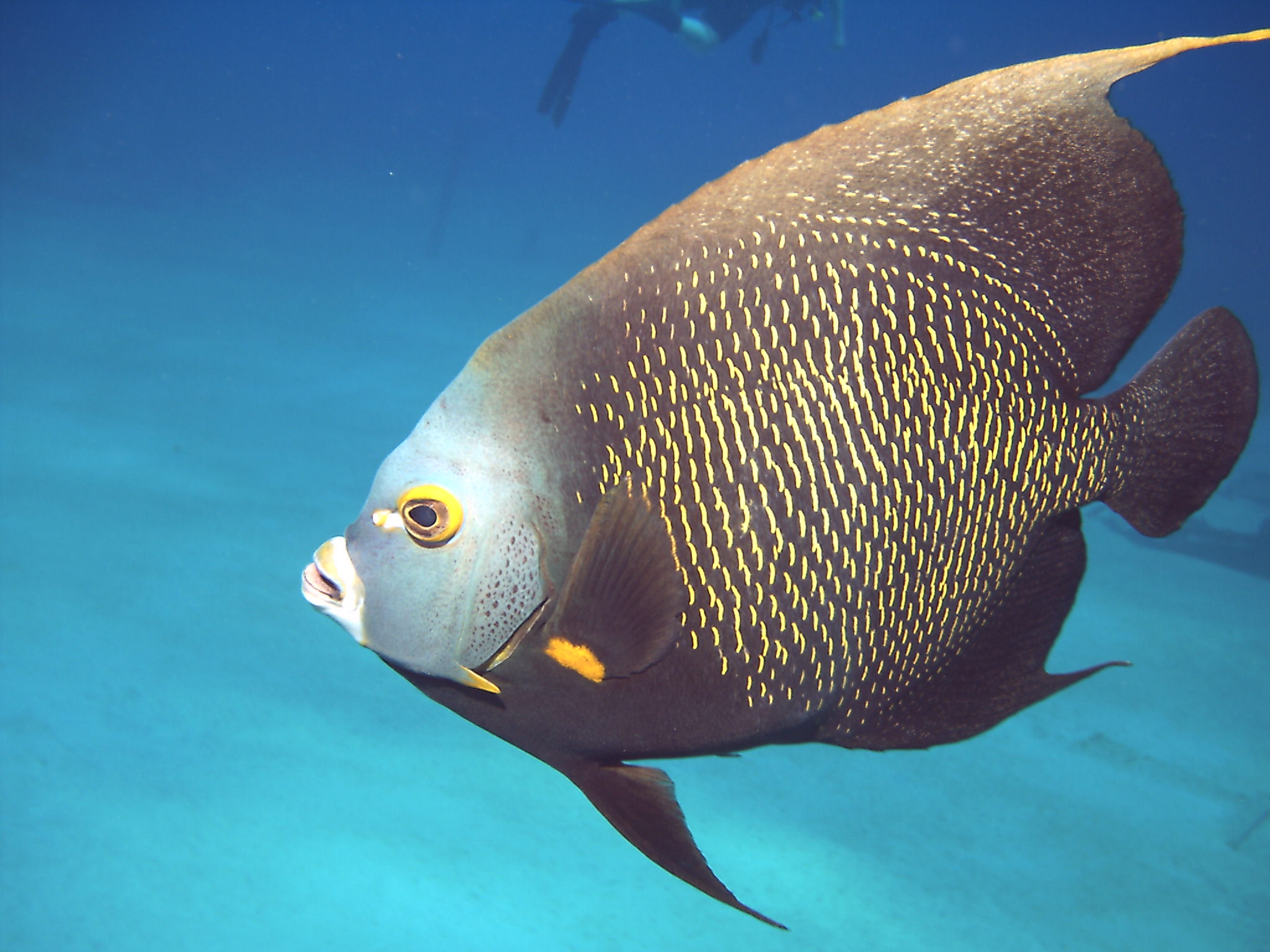
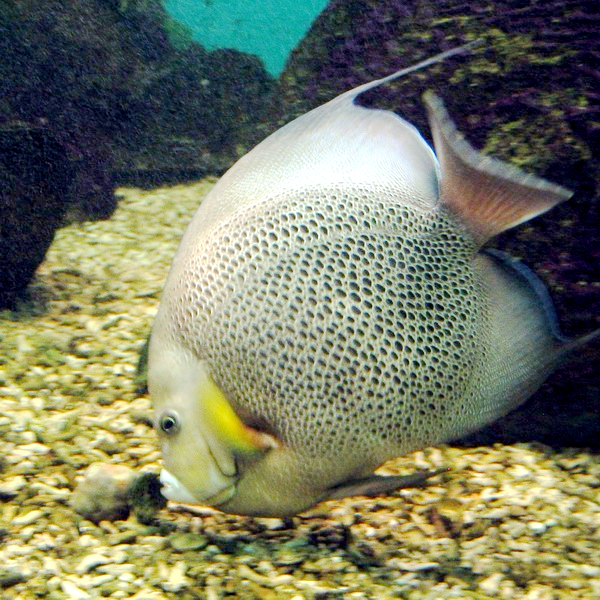
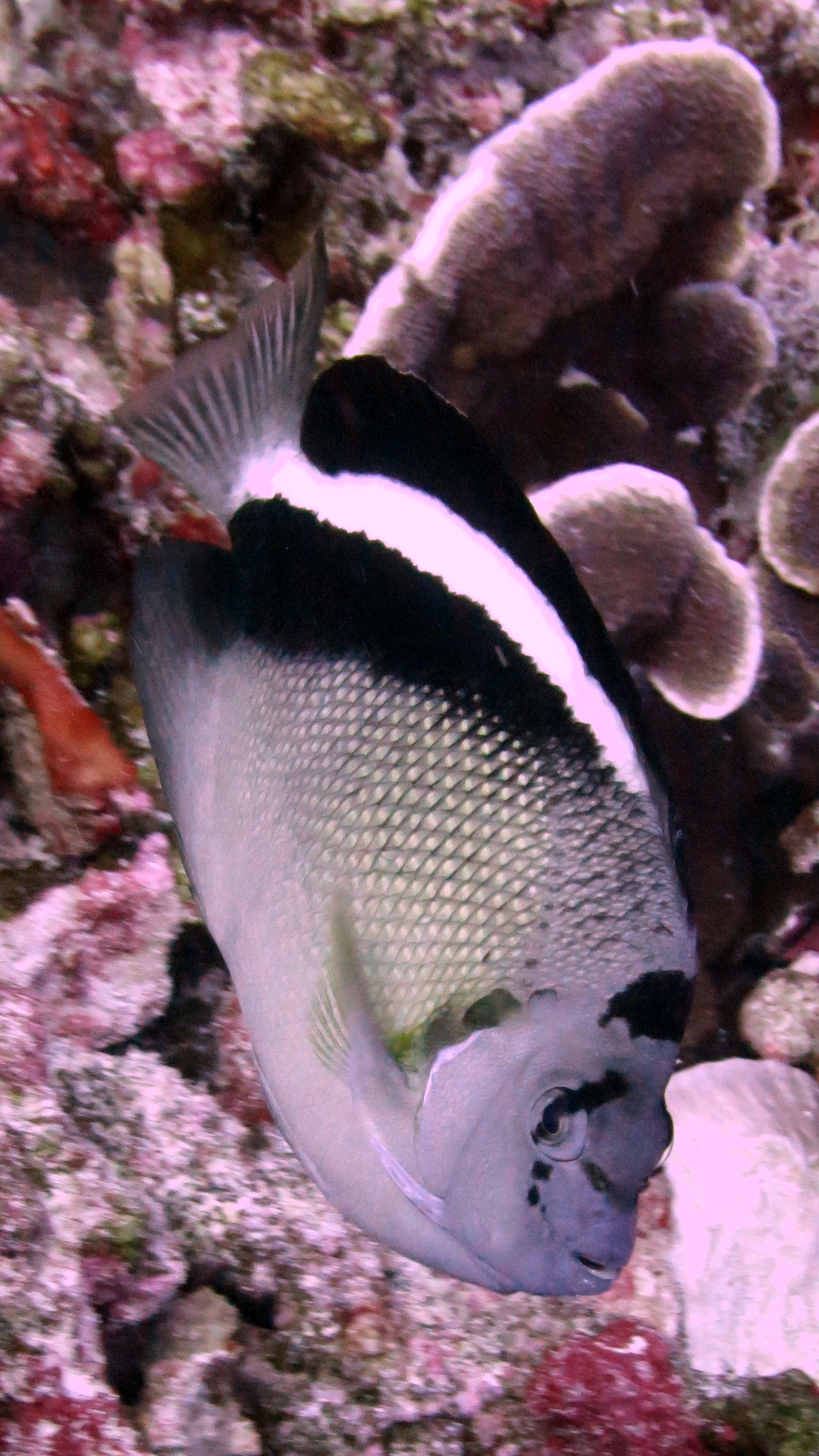
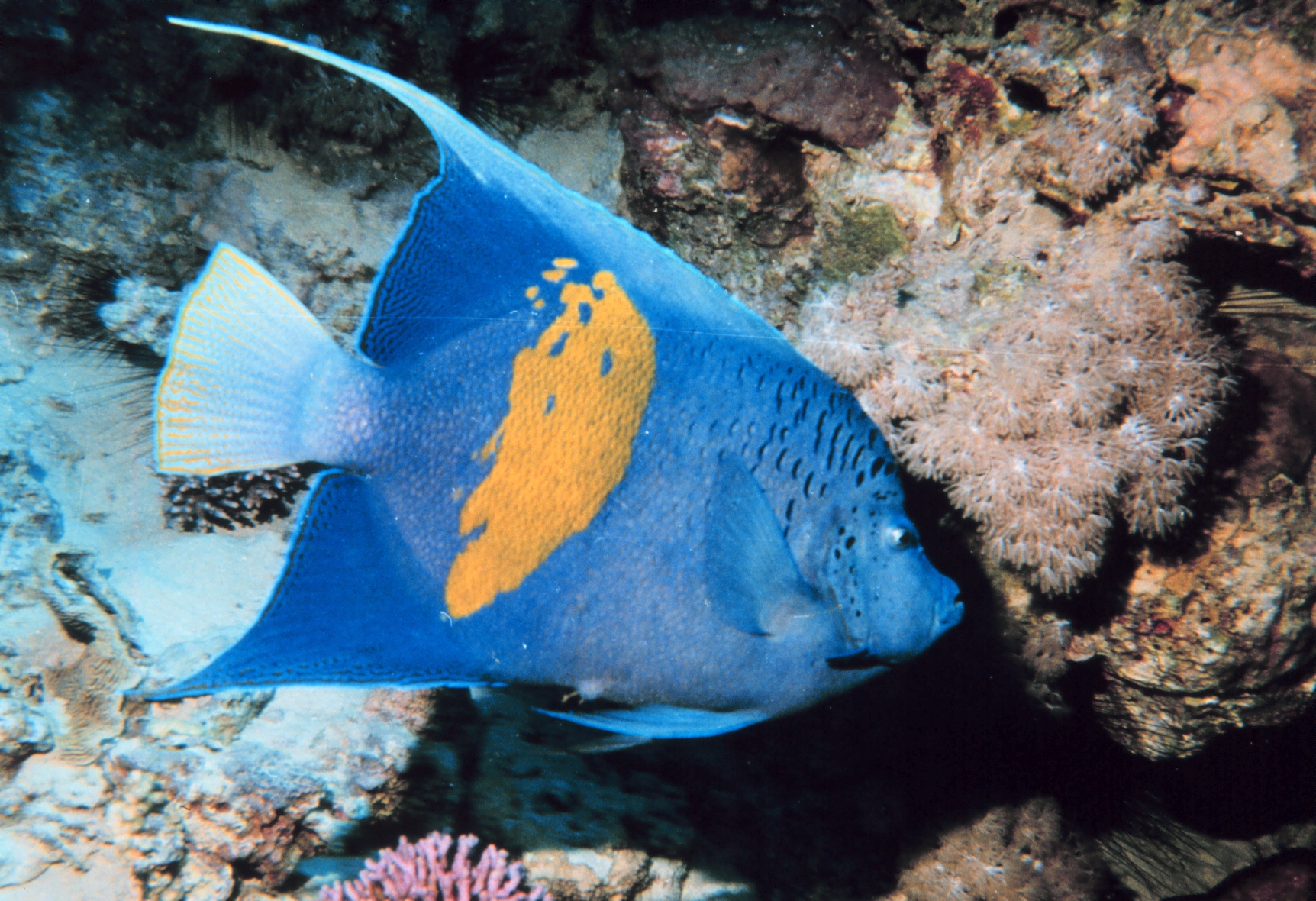
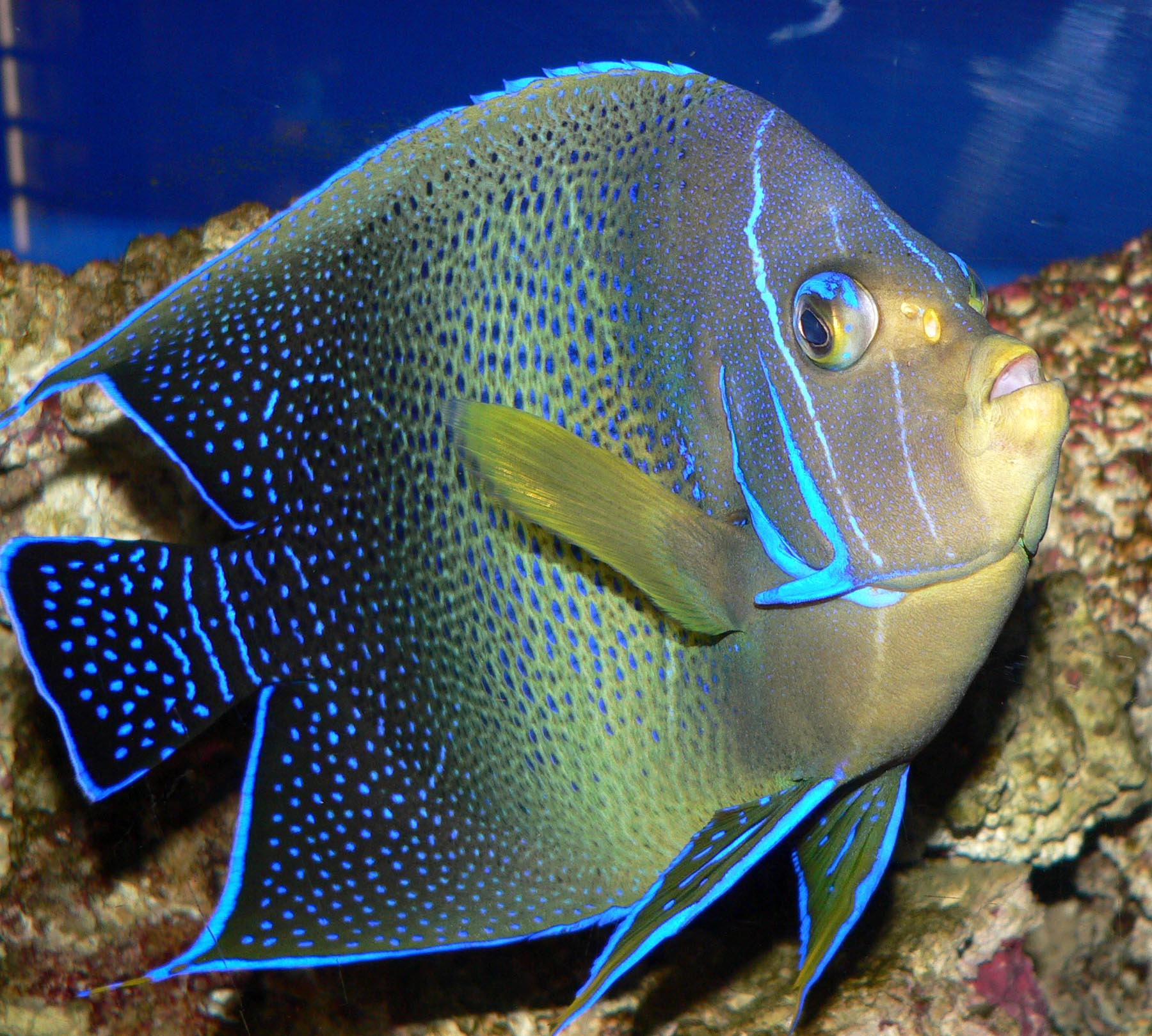
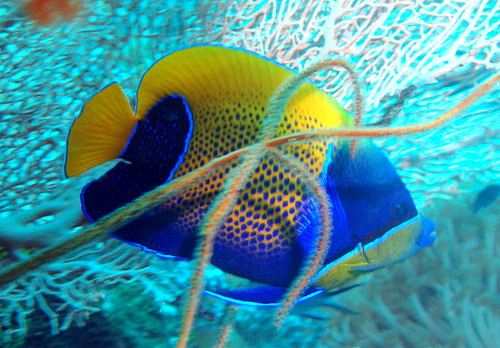
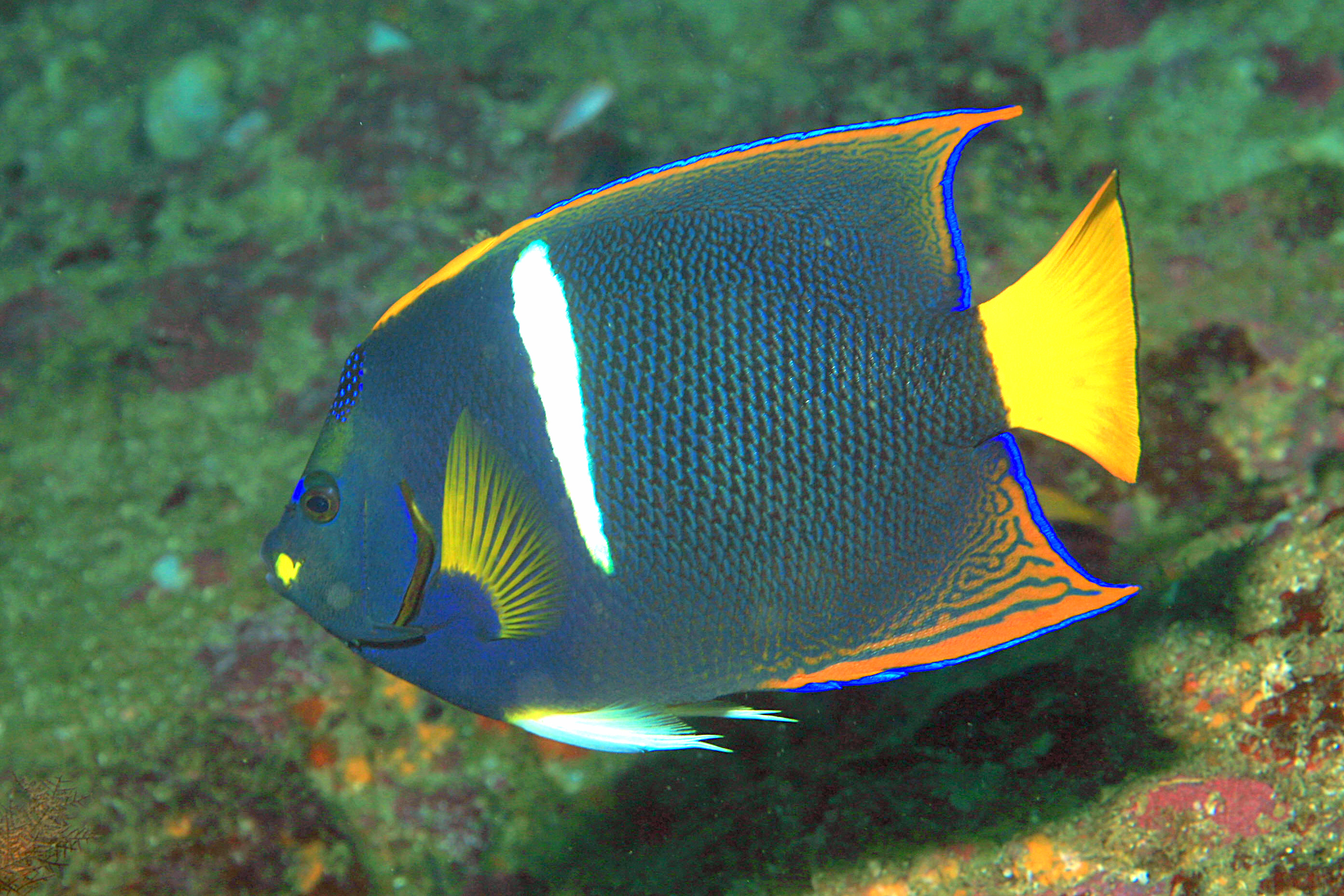
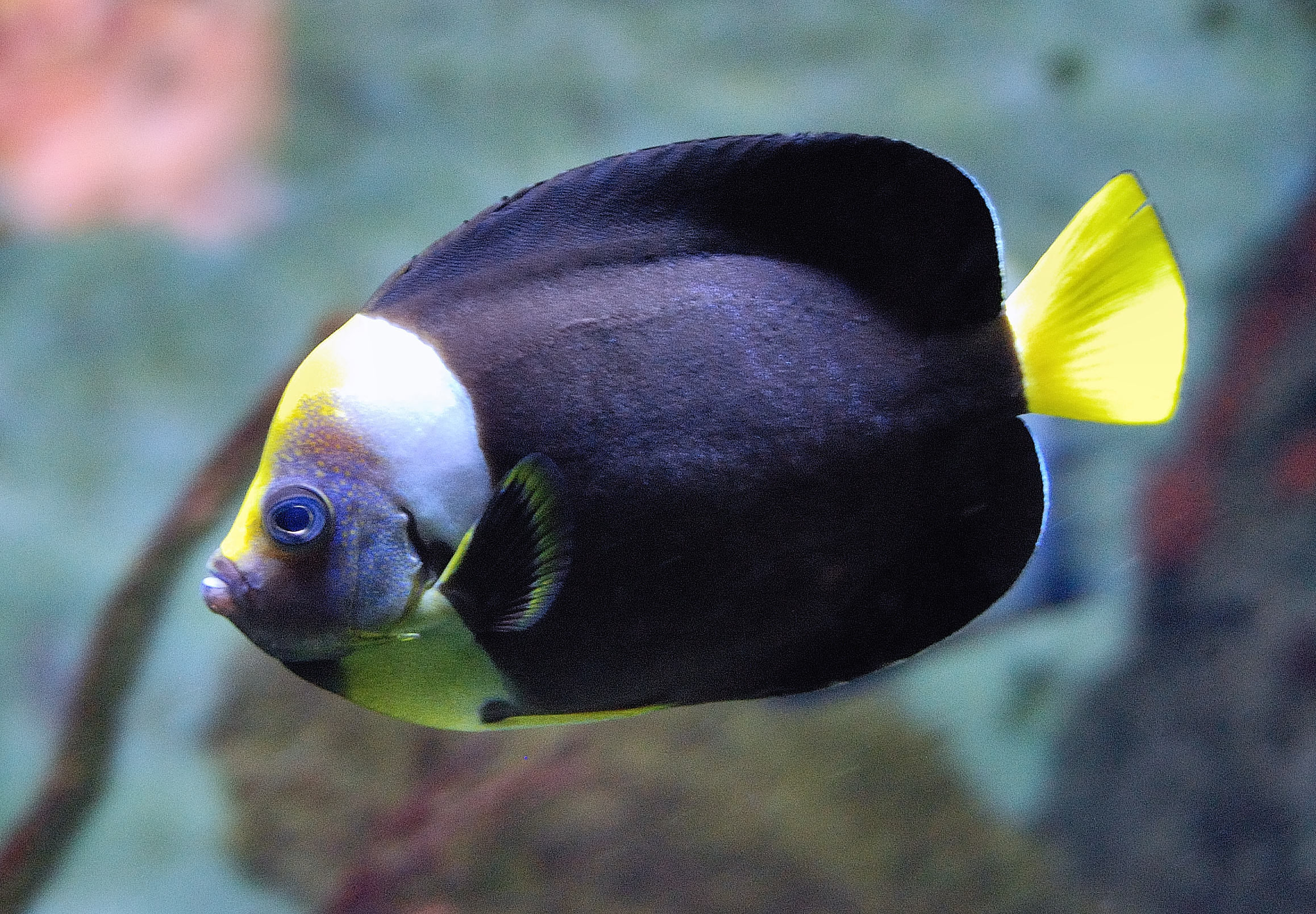
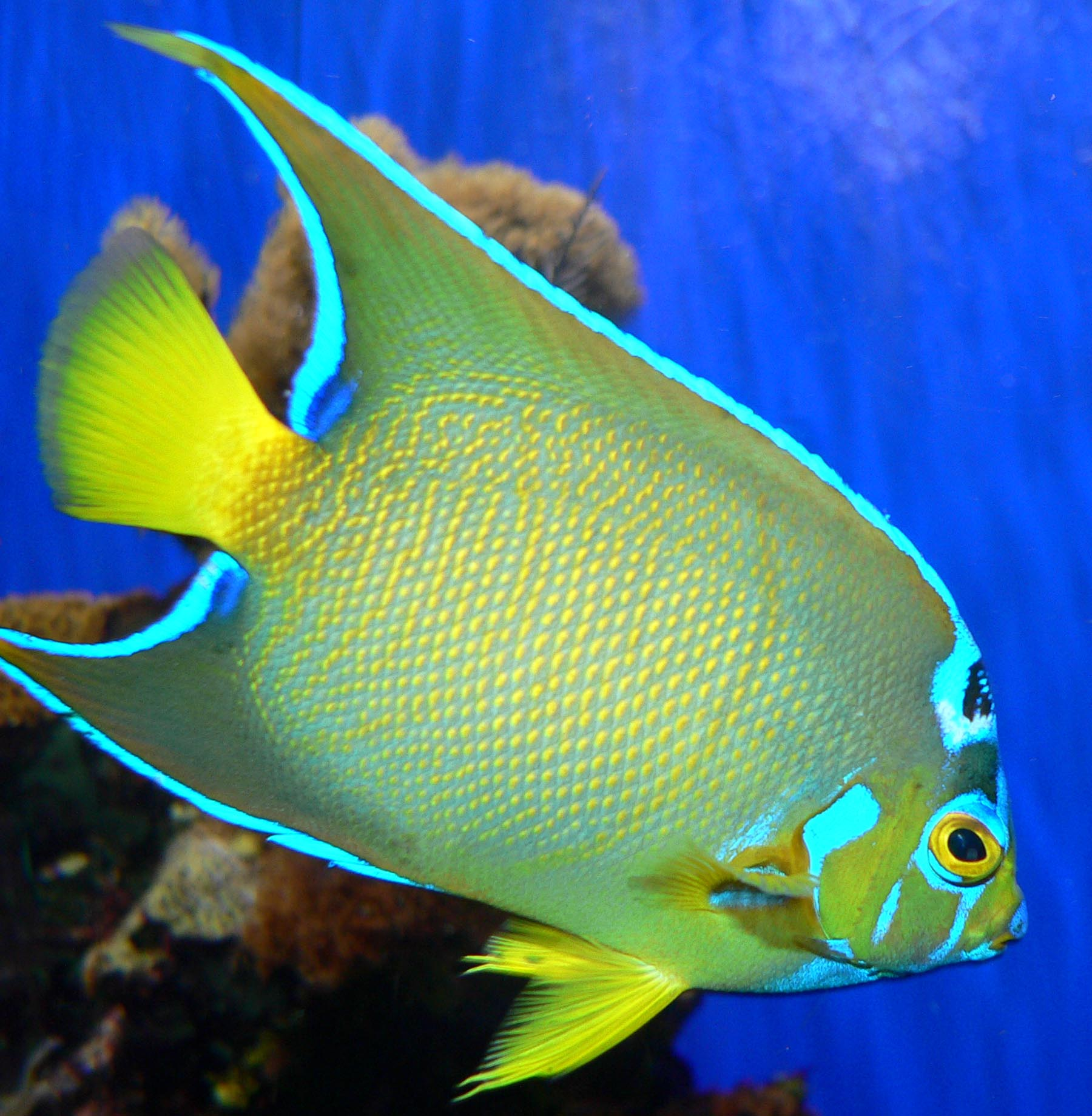
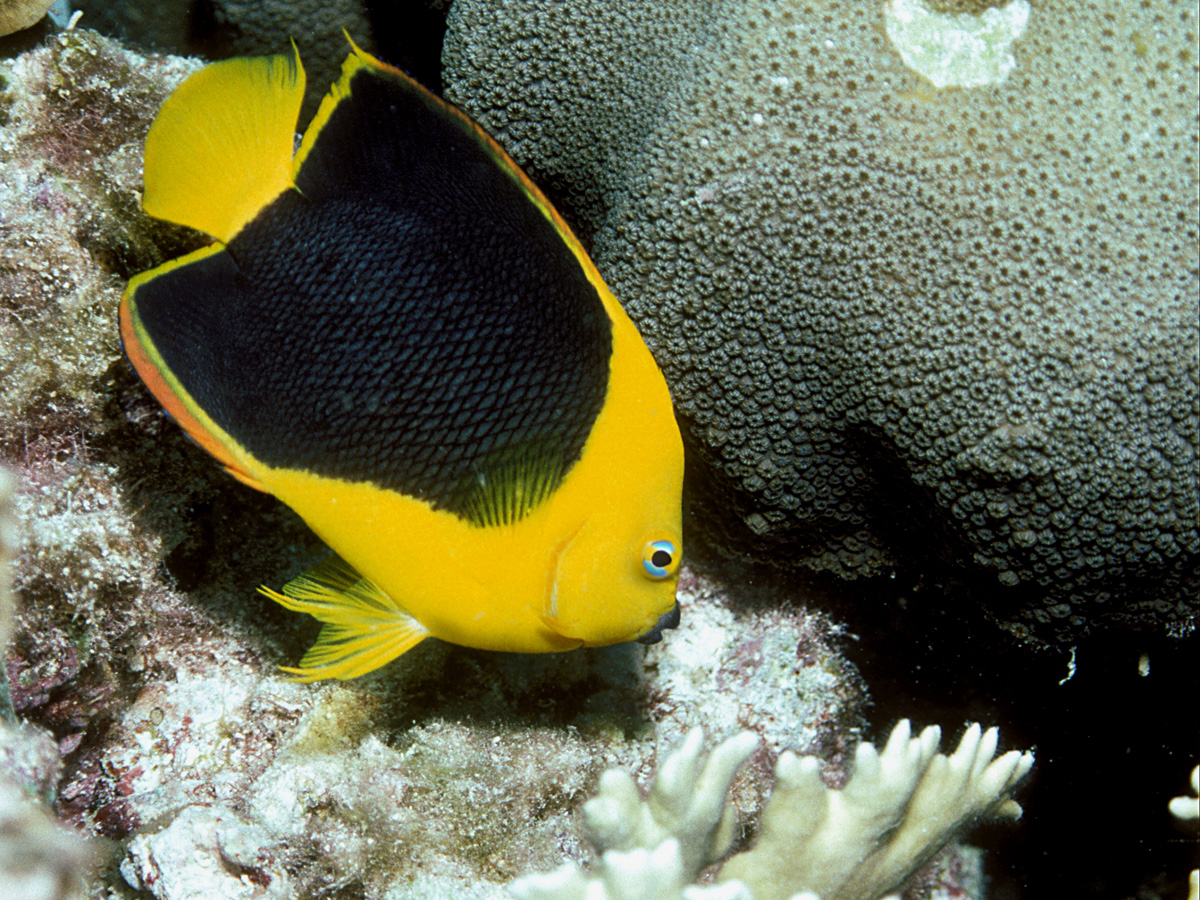
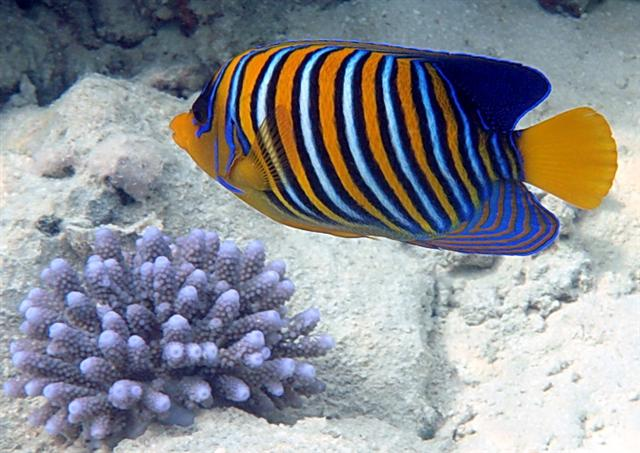
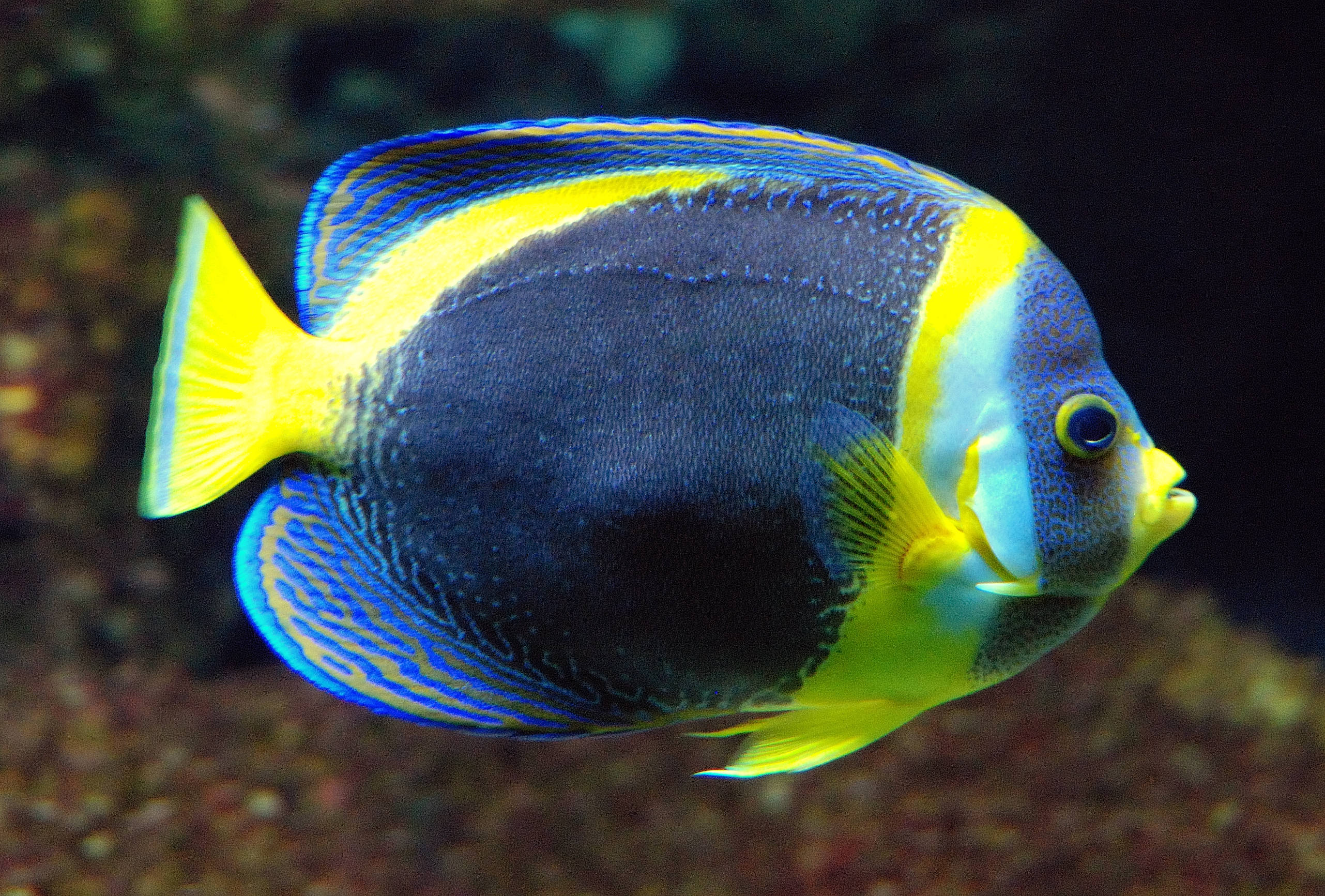
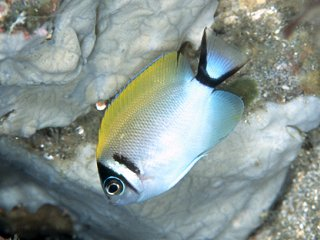
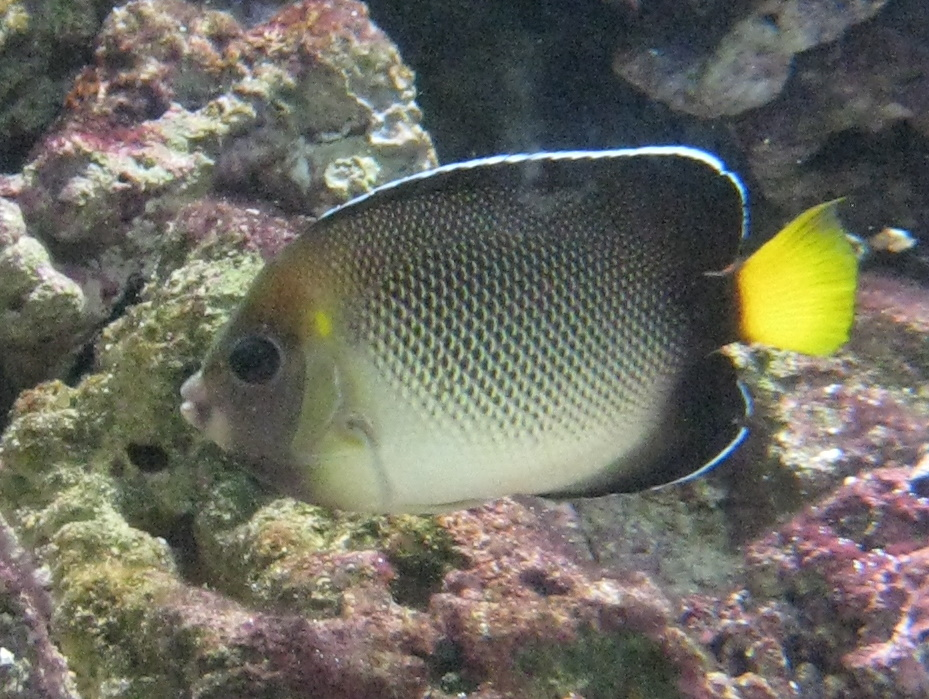
Common name	Image	Taxonomy	Reef safe	Description	Max size
Blue ring angelfish, annularis angelfish		Pomacanthus annularis	No		30 cm (11.8 in)
Arabian angelfish, Asfur angelfish		Pomacanthus asfur	No		40 cm (15.7 in)
Bellus angelfish		Genicanthus bellus	Yes	Light blue all over. Exhibits strong sexual dimorphism: females have wide black bands, males' bands are orange.	18 cm (7.1 in)
Blue angelfish		Holacanthus bermudensis	No	Juveniles are dark with vibrant blue bars and yellow face; Adults yellowish body with bright yellow and blue edges on the fins, blue markings on face. Missing blue crown of the Queen Angelfish.	45 cm (17.7 in)
Bluespotted angelfish		Chaetodontoplus caeruleopunctatus	No		21 cm (8.3 in)
Blueface angelfish		Pomacanthus xanthometopon	With Caution		40 cm (15.7 in)
Cortez angelfish		Pomacanthus zonipectus	No	Darkly hued with yellow stripes.	46 cm (18.1 in)
Emperor angelfish		Pomacanthus imperator	No	Juveniles are black with blue-white spiraling; adults are blue with yellow stripes, accented with white and black and a blue mask. Will easily be the dominant angelfish if housed with other angels.	40 cm (15.7 in)
French angelfish		Pomacanthus paru	No	Juveniles are black with 3 yellow vertically running stripes, may also display blue on pelvic fins. Adults lard black with white vertical stripes.	41 cm (16.1 in)
Gray angelfish		Pomacanthus arcuatus	No	Light grey with dark spots and bluish/grey mask over face. Closely related to French Angelfish.	60 cm (23.6 in)
Griffis angelfish		Apolemichthys griffisi	No	An ashen white angel with thick black bands and spots, it is a rare find within the aquarium trade.	25 cm (9.8 in)
Half-moon angelfish, Yellow bar angelfish		Pomacanthus maculosus	No	Blue with yellow splotch-like marking on side.	50 cm (19.7 in)
Koran angelfish		Pomacanthus semicirculatus	No	Grey towards the face, becoming a navy blue towards the caudal fin with striking iridescent blue accents throughout.	40 cm (15.7 in)
Majestic angelfish or blue girdled angelfish		Pomacanthus navarchus	No	Yellow dorsal and caudal fins connecting to "saddal" with dark blue dots. Dark blue underside and anal fin. Electric blue separating yellow and dark blue.	30 cm (11.8 in)
Passer angelfish or King angelfish		Holacanthus passer	No	Very dark blue with yellow caudal fin and distinctive white stripe.	36 cm (14.2 in)
Personifer angelfish or Queensland yellowtail angelfish		Chaetodontoplus meridithii	No		37 cm (14.6 in)
Queen angelfish		Holacanthus ciliaris	No	Tan coloured with yellow caudal fin and neon blue outlined fins. This species has been known to reproduce with the Blue Angelfish, making a half breed that looks like a mixture between the two species.	45 cm (17.7 in)
Rock beauty		Holacanthus tricolor	No		25 cm (9.8 in)
Royal angelfish		Pygoplites diacanthus	No	Orange and blue striped with dark blue dorsal fin and lemon yellow caudal fin.	25 cm (9.8 in)
Scribbled angelfish		Chaetodontoplus duboulayi	No		25 cm (9.8 in)
Japanese swallow angelfish		Genicanthus semifasciatus	Yes	Black and tan striped back with yellow blaze beginning at the mouth and tapering off towards the centre of the side, with light blueish grey underside. Has distinctively shaped tail resembling that of a swallow.	21 cm (8.3 in)
Yellowtail angelfish		Apolemichthys xanthurus	No		15 cm (5.9 in)

== Angelfish (dwarf) ==
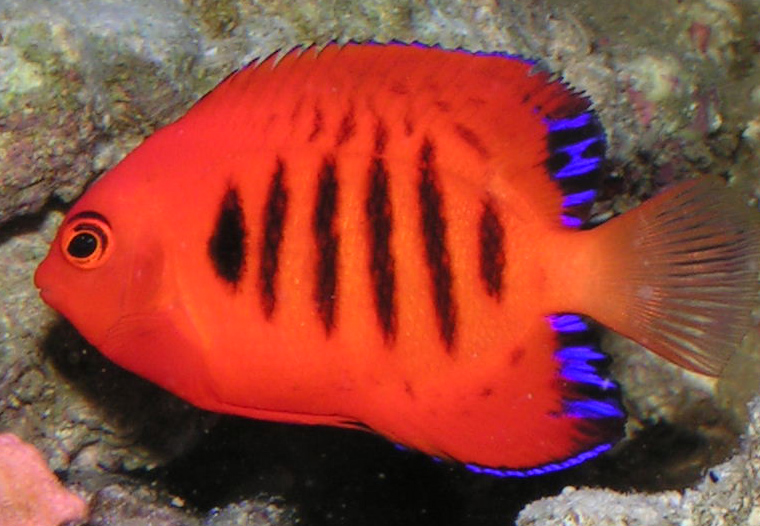
Flame angelfish

Although Dwarf Angelfish are smaller and generally more manageable than their larger counterparts, they still have some specific care requirements. They are omnivores, but plenty of vegetable matter, preferably in the form of macroalgae, should be provided for their grazing pleasure. Their suitability for reef tanks is hotly debated, so add at your own risk. Specimens that have been successfully maintained in reef aquaria include the Flame and Coral Beauty angels. However, for obvious reasons they should not be put into tanks with expensive decorative macroalgae.

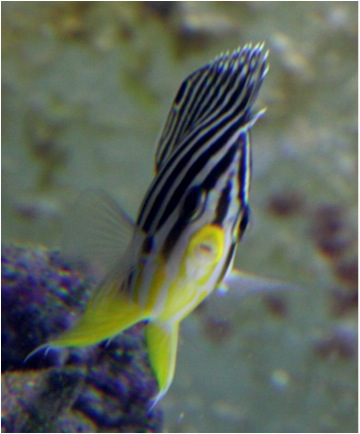
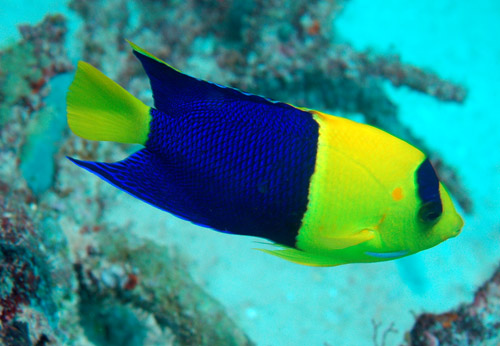
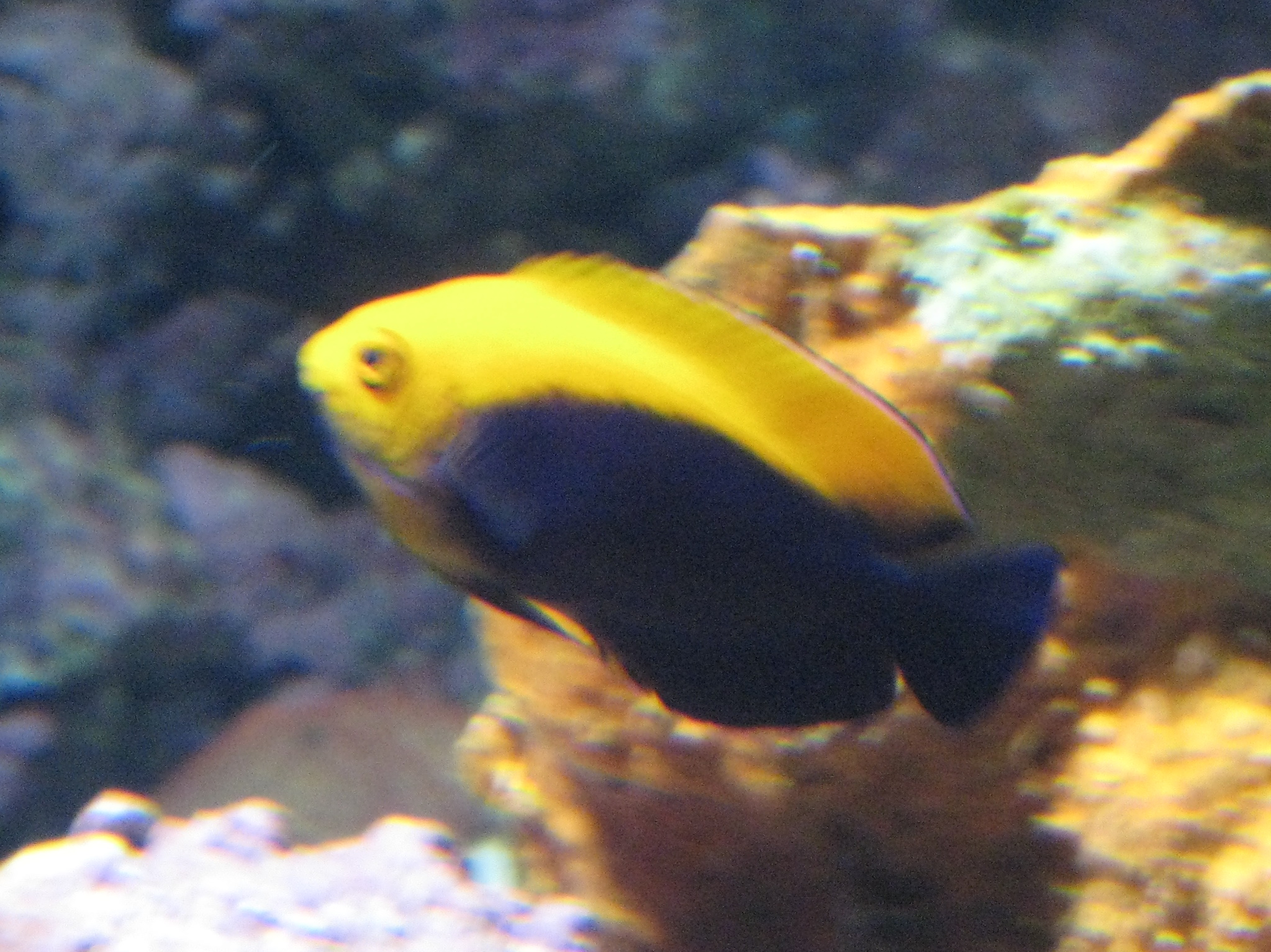
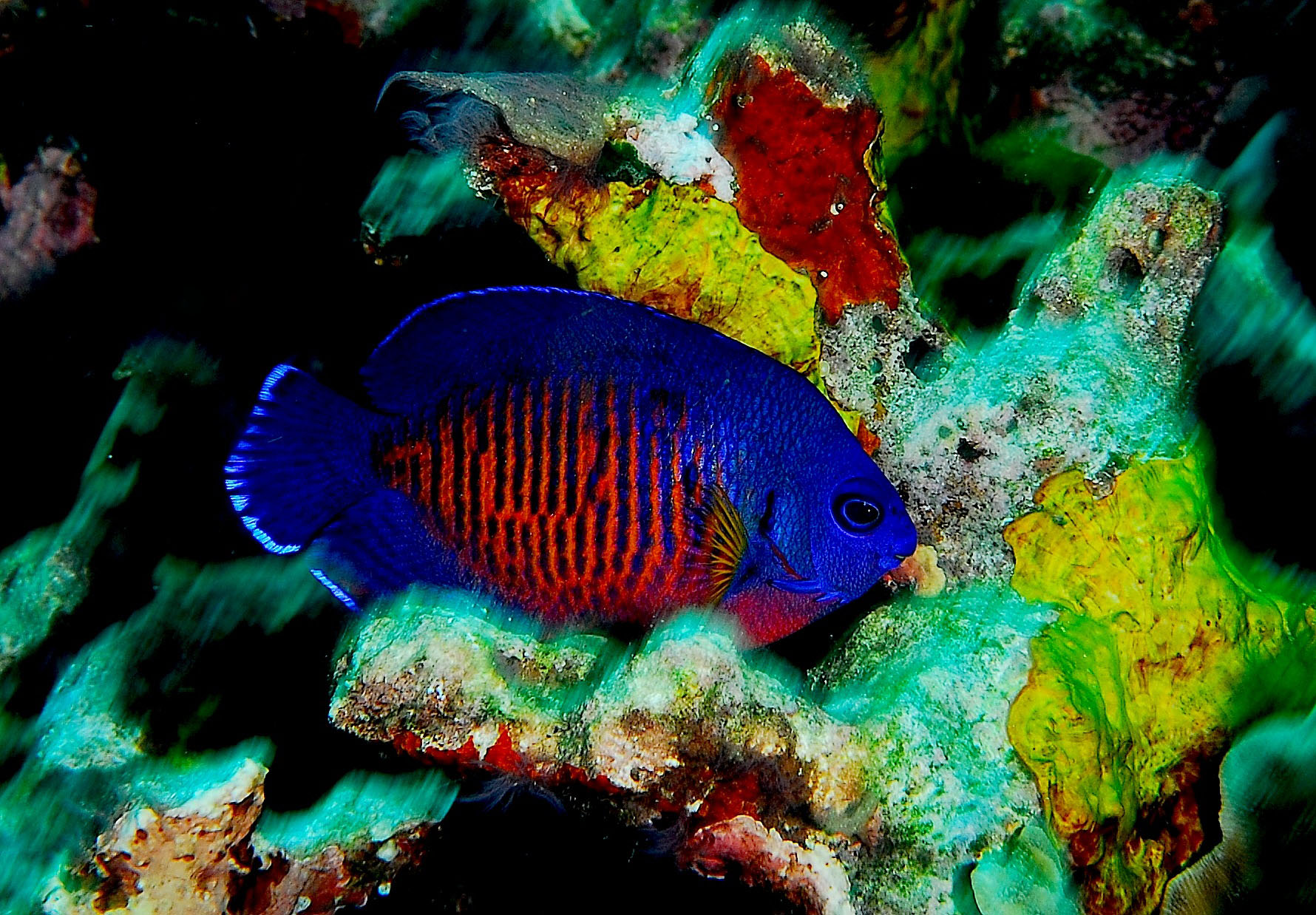
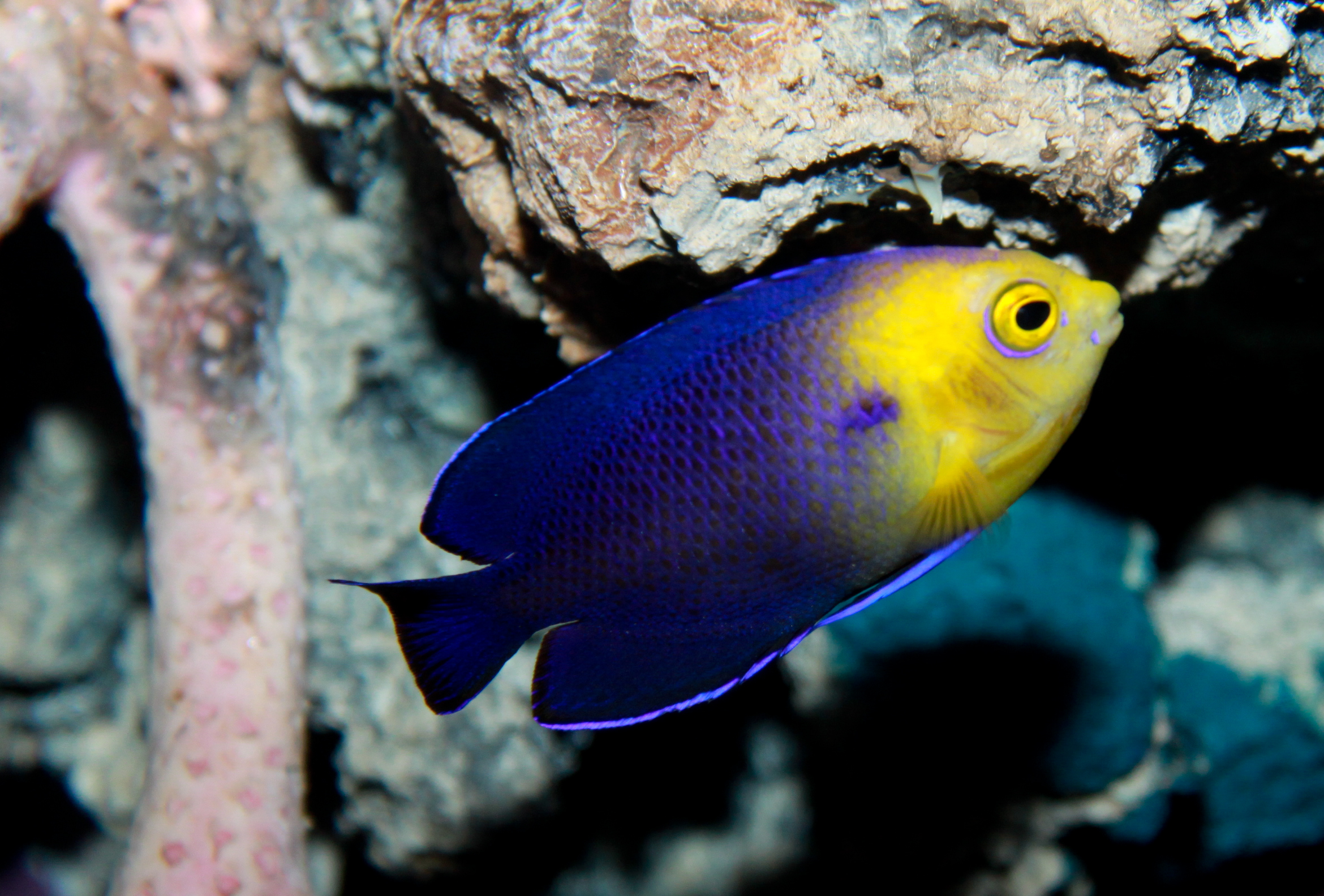
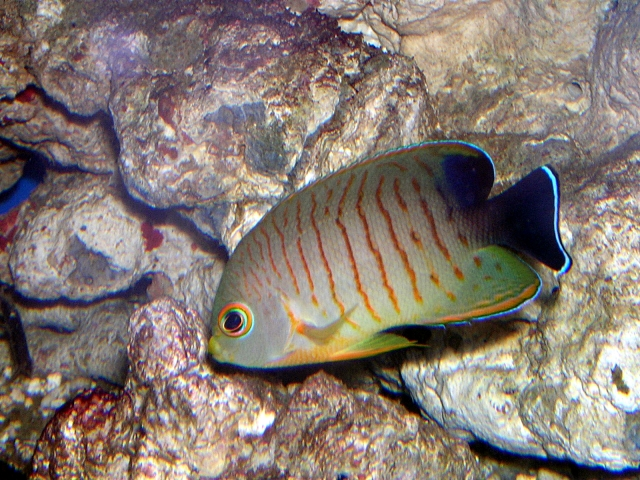
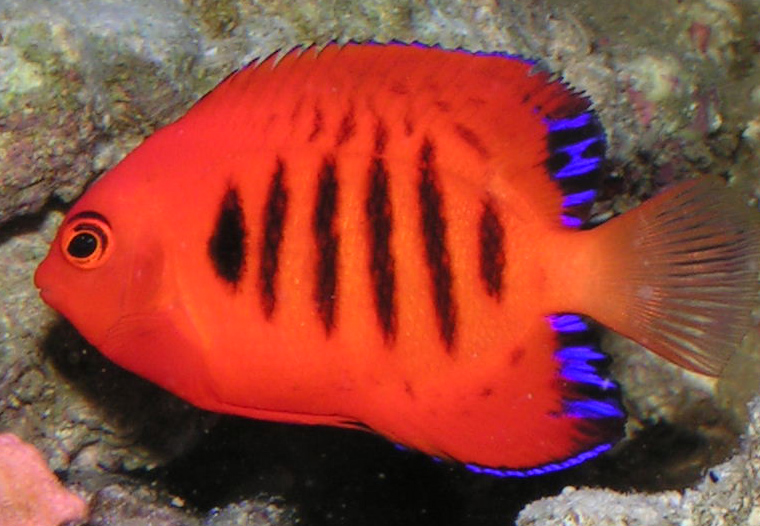
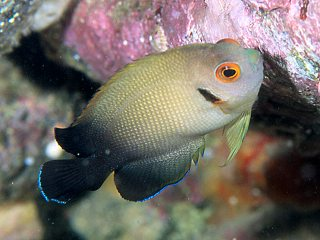
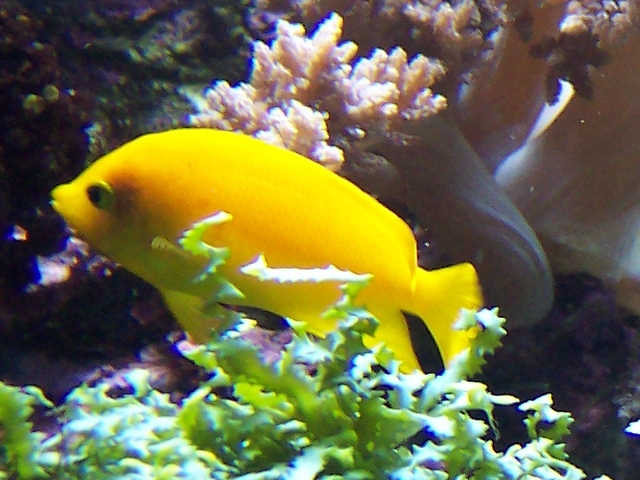
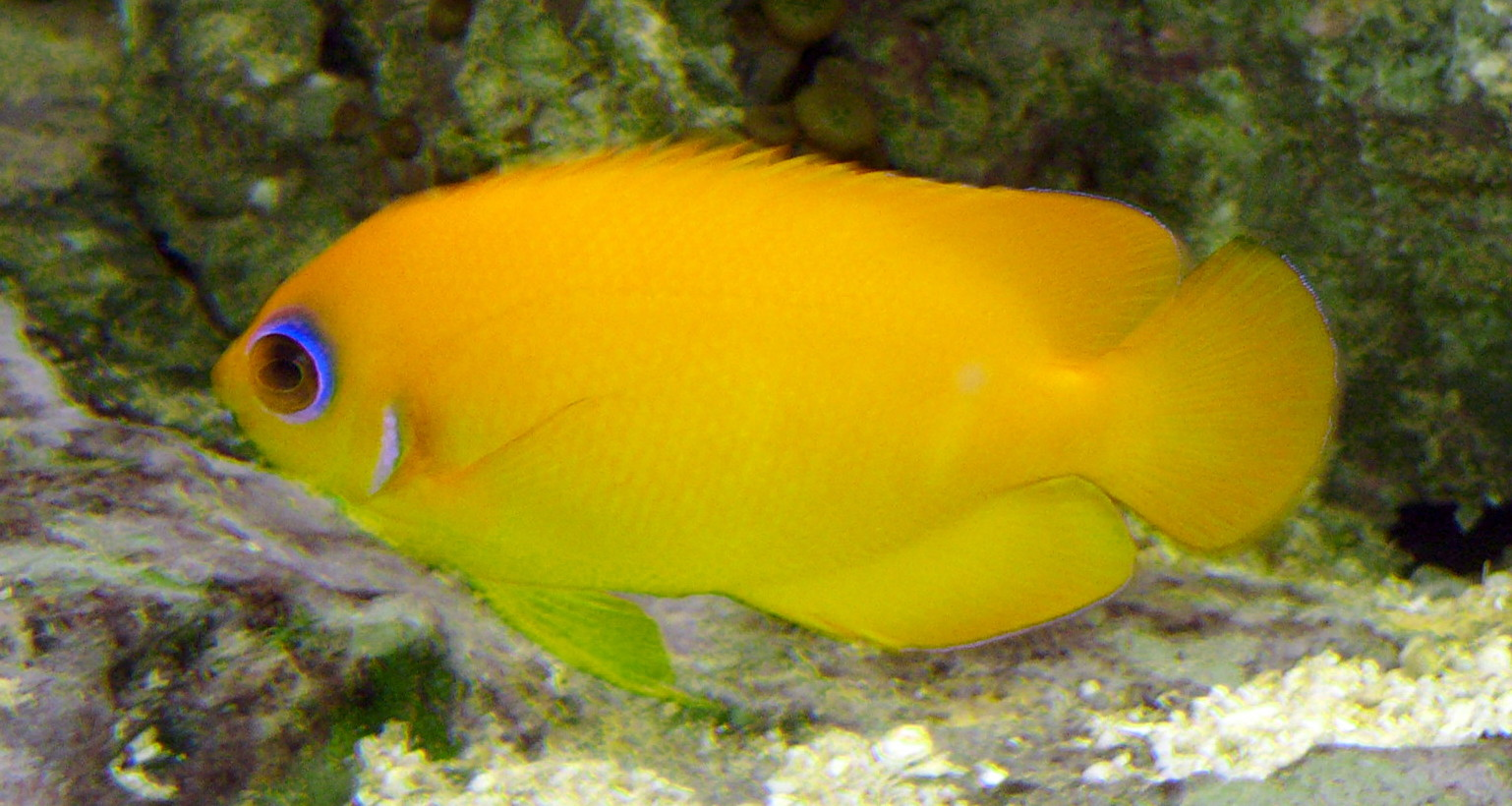
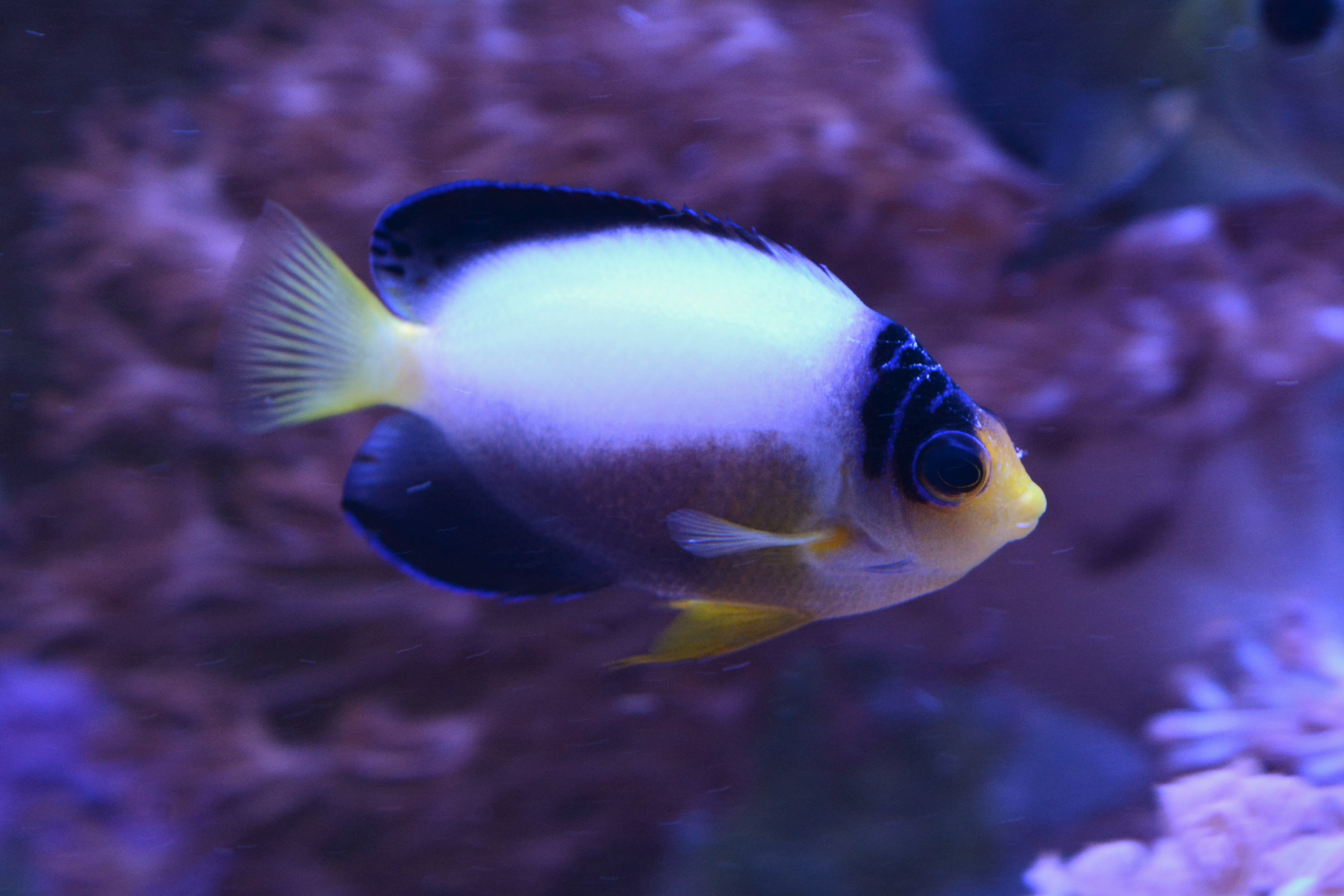
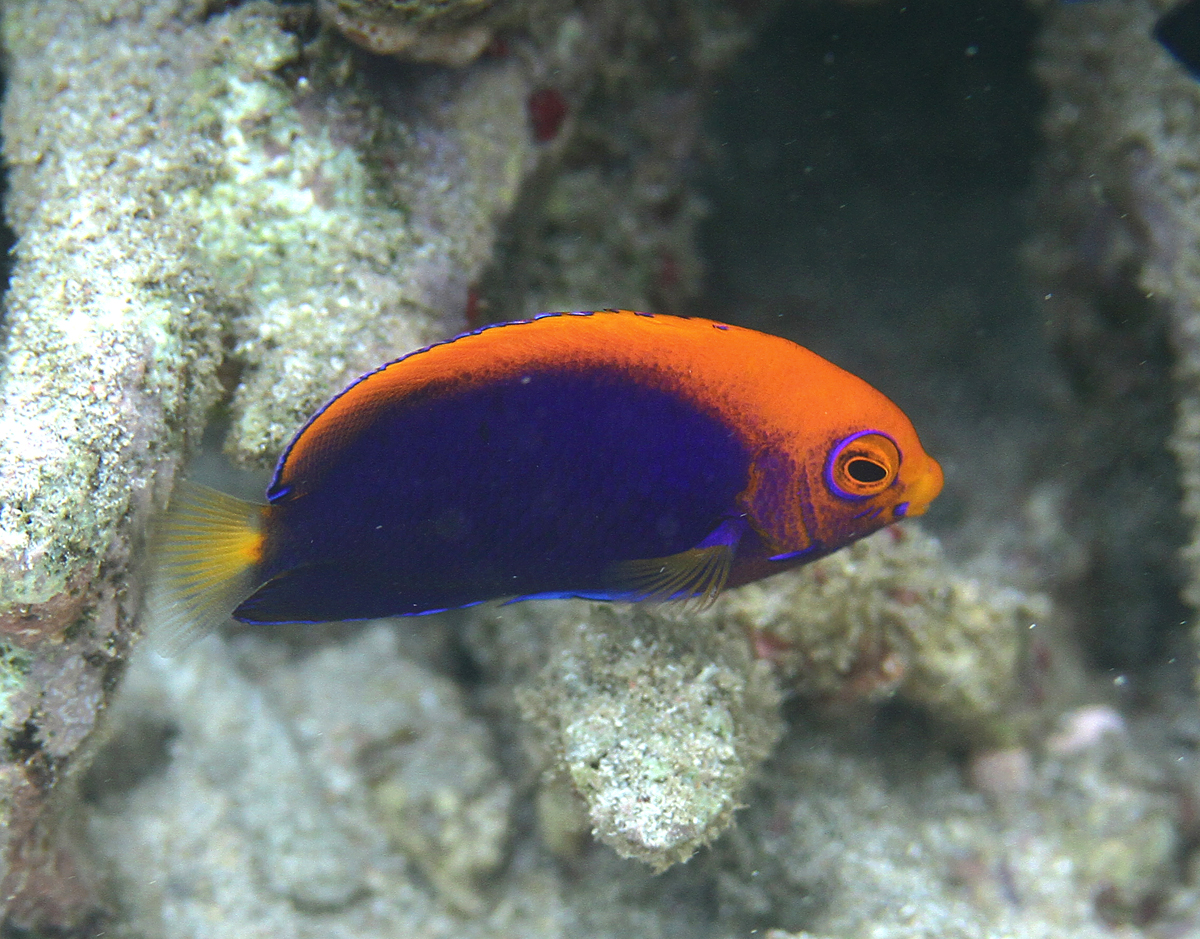
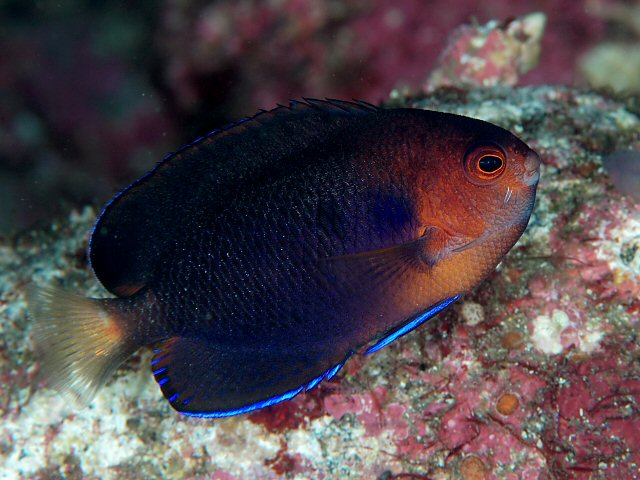
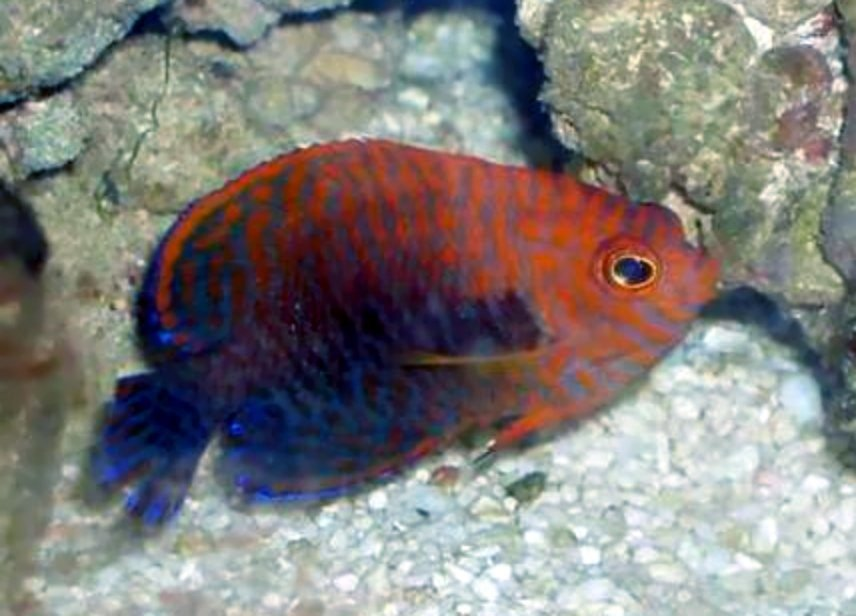
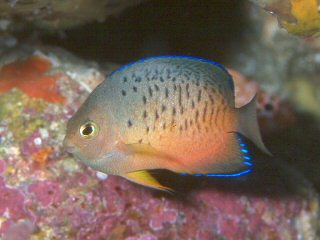
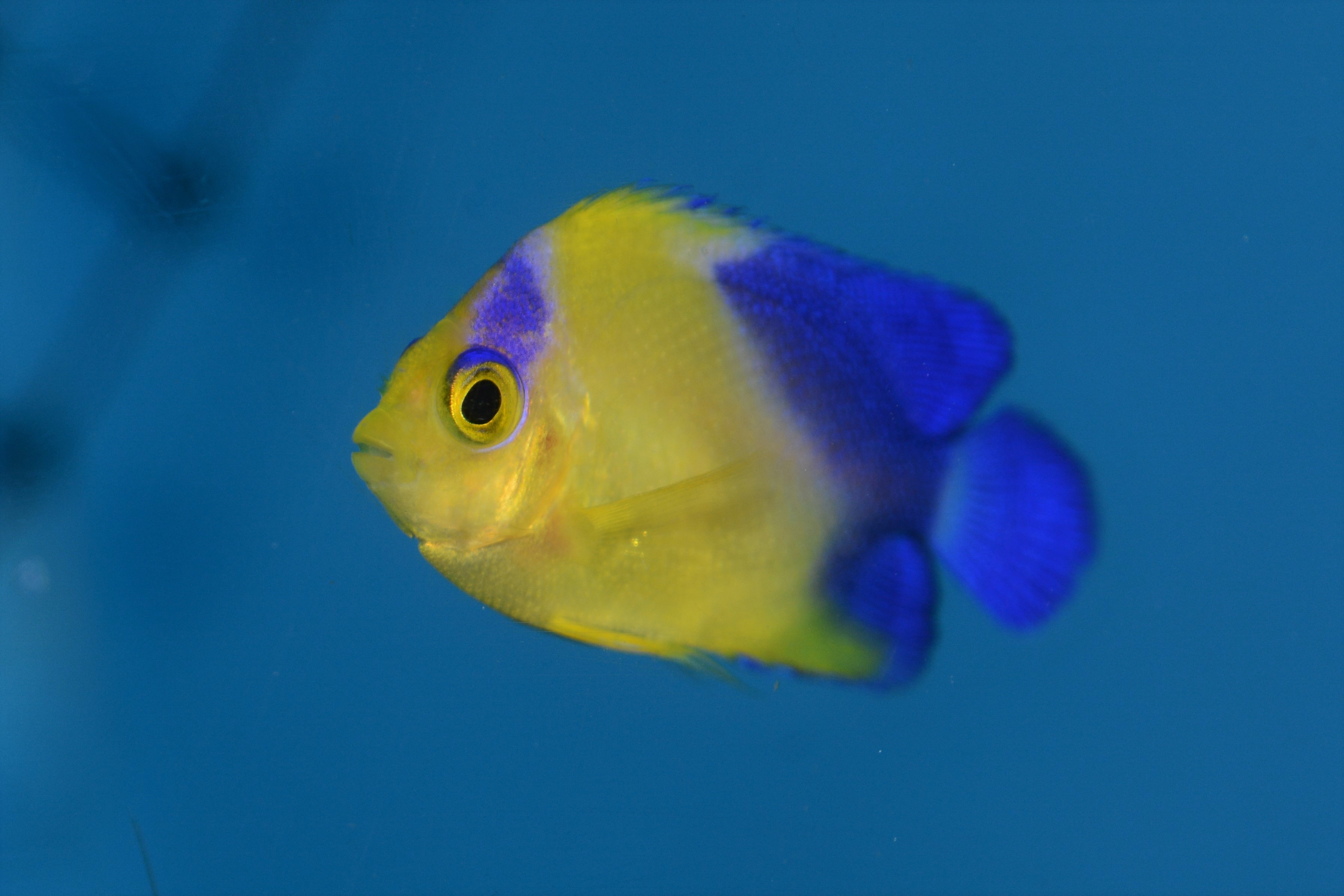
Common name	Image	Taxonomy	Reef safe	Description	Max size
Barred angelfish		Centropyge multifasciata	With caution	White fish with vertical black stripes that change to yellow at the belly	12 cm (4.7 in)
Bicolor angelfish		Centropyge bicolor	With caution		15 cm (5.9 in)
Blue Velvet Angelfish		Centropyge deborae
Brazilian flameback angelfish		Centropyge aurantonotus	With caution		8 cm (3.1 in)
Coral beauty angelfish		Centropyge bispinosa	With caution	Reddish body with blue back and orange fins. A shy fish that prefers multiple hiding locations.	10 cm (3.9 in)
Cherubfish or Pygmy angelfish		Centropyge argi	With caution	Blue colored body with an orange yellow head.	8 cm (3.1 in)
Eibli angelfish		Centropyge eibli	With caution	Tan coloured body with vertical brown stripes and large distinctive black splotch covering the back of the fish, including the caudal fin.	15 cm (5.9 in)
Flame angelfish		Centropyge loricula	Yes	Vivid orange-red with vertical black stripes and blue patches toward the end of the dorsal and anal fins.	15 cm (5.9 in)
Pearlscale angelfish		Centropyge vroliki	With caution	Anterior is gray to pearly white with orange accent around eye, posterior is deep black.	12 cm (4.7 in)
Herald's angelfish		Centropyge heraldi	With caution	Completely lemon yellow, with a brown marking around the eye.	10 cm (3.9 in)
Keyhole angelfish		Centropyge tibicen	No	Centropyge type species. Overall black with an elongate vertical black blotch on the middle of the upper sides. When small, mainly black with a white bar. Dorsal and anal fins with submarginal blue line; most of the pelvic and the anterior portion of the anal fin yellow. Caudal fin with submarginal blue line.	19 cm (7.5 in)
Lemonpeel angelfish		Centropyge flavissima	With caution	Bright yellow with distinctive dark semicircle by operculum.	14 cm (5.5 in)
Multicolor angelfish		Centropyge multicolor	With caution		9 cm (3.5 in)
Orange-back angelfish		Centropyge acanthops	With caution	Dark blue with golden yellow blaze running from the face down the dorsal fin, with a colourless caudal fin.	8 cm (3.1 in)
Pacific pygmy angelfish		Centropyge flavicauda	With caution		8 cm (3.1 in)
Potter's angelfish		Centropyge potteri	With caution	Similarly coloured to the Coral Beauty, but with a blue body and reddish fins.	10 cm (3.9 in)
Rusty angelfish		Centropyge ferrugata	Yes	Tan coloured body with dark spots and a reddish tint around the anal fin.	10 cm (3.9 in)
Venustus angelfish		Centropyge venustus	With caution		12 cm (4.7 in)

== Anthias ==
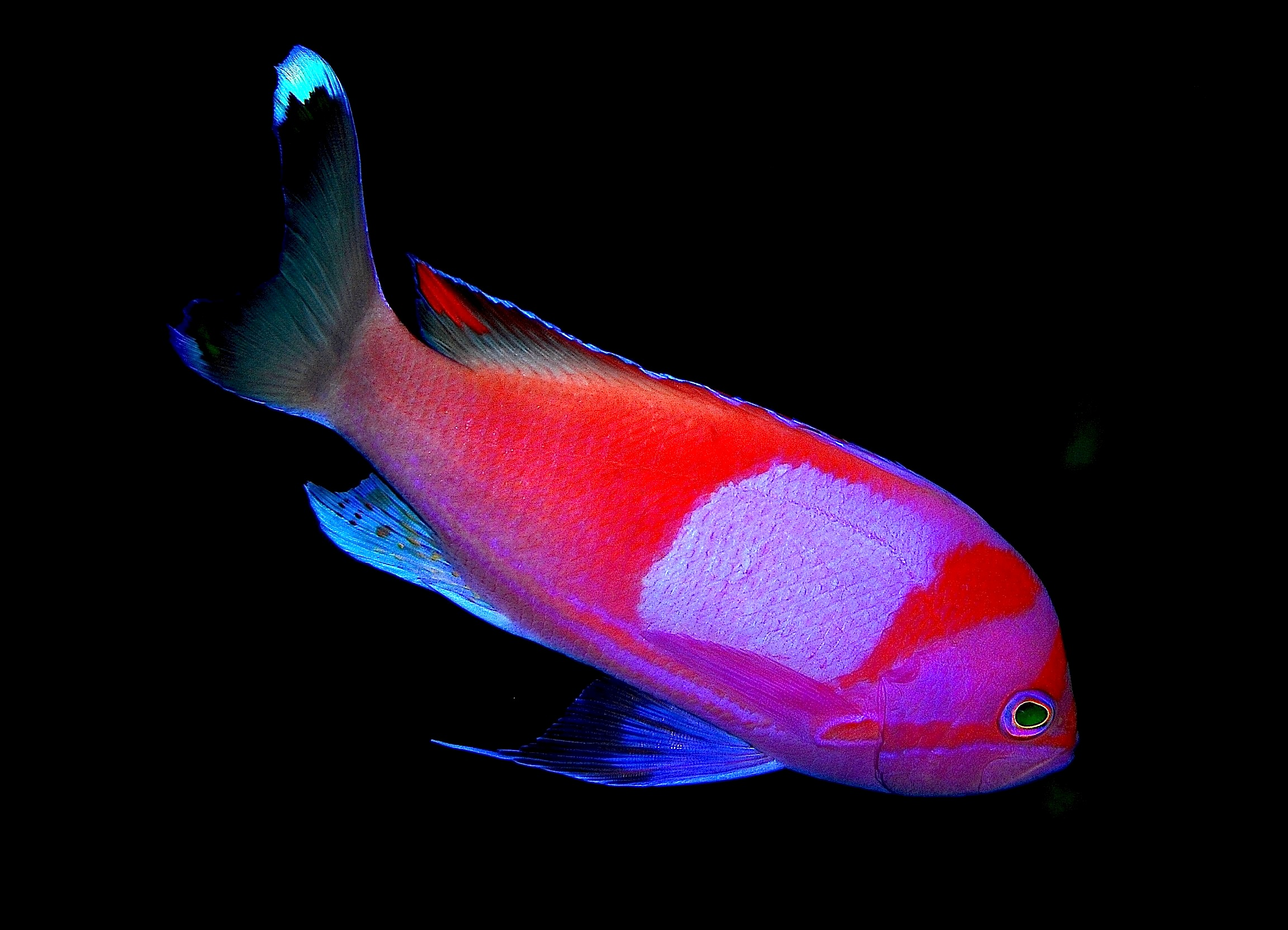
Squareback anthias

Although Anthias resemble damsels in shape and size, the two should never be confused. Anthias (also known as "fairy basslets") are finicky and many starve to death in captivity. In the wild, they eat zooplankton, and will not accept anything else in the aquarium. They also need to be fed nearly constantly, three times a day at least. The best way to ensure the health and longevity of an Anthias is to attach a refugium where copepods can be grown to "drip" into the display tank. Unlike many other saltwater aquarium inhabitants, they can be kept in groups.

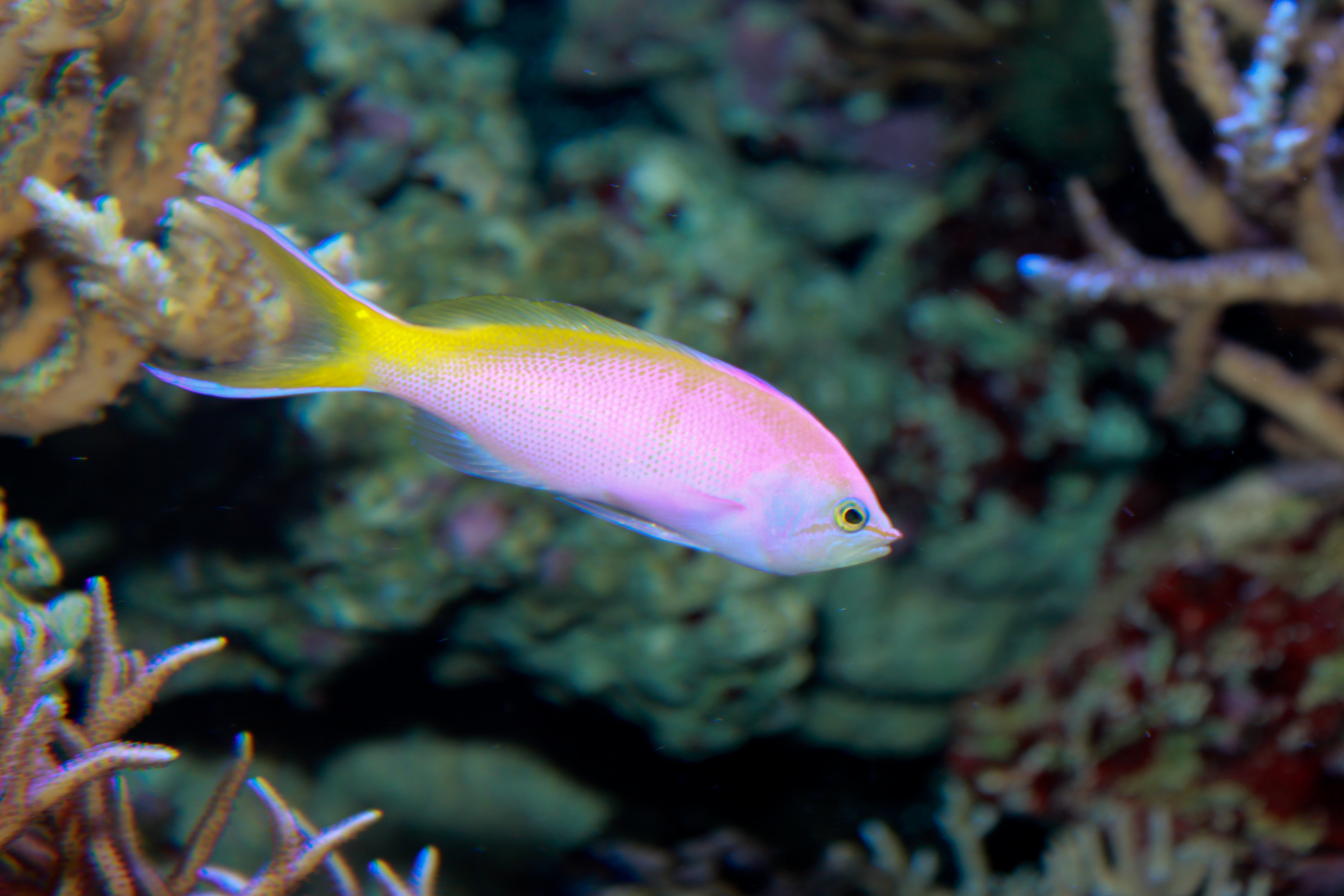
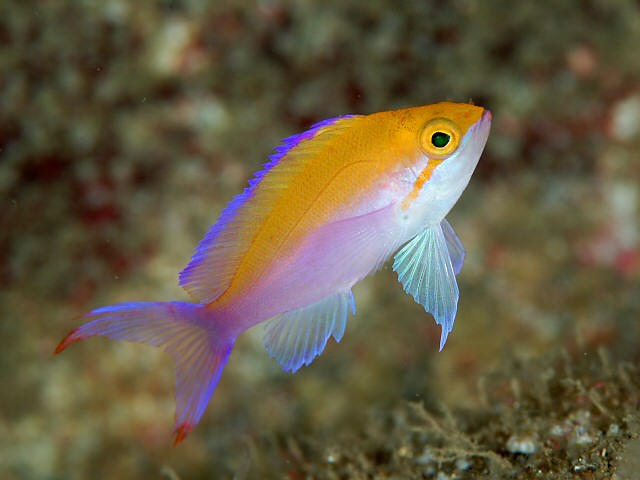
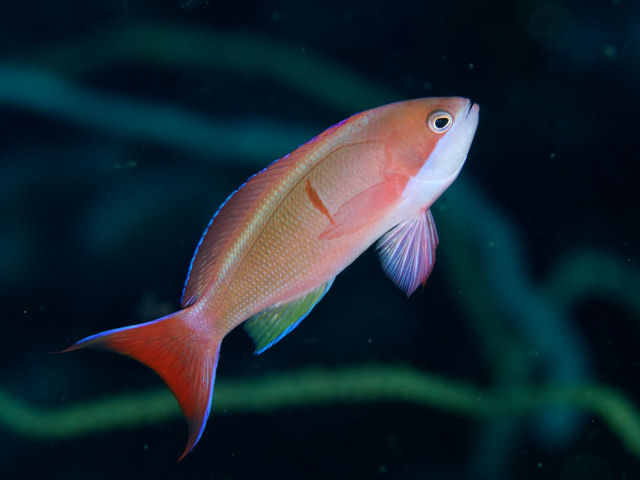
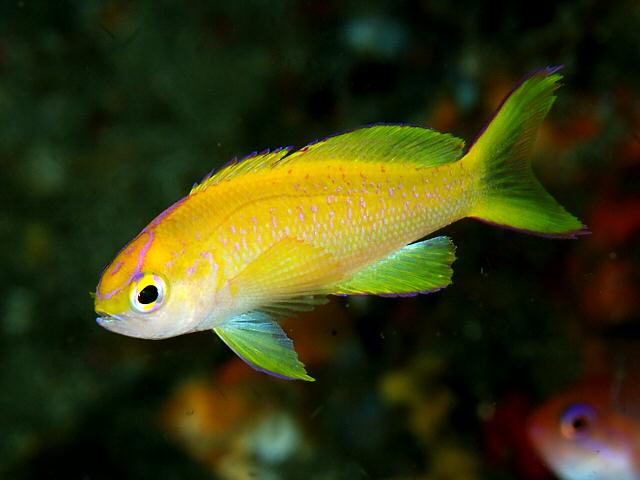
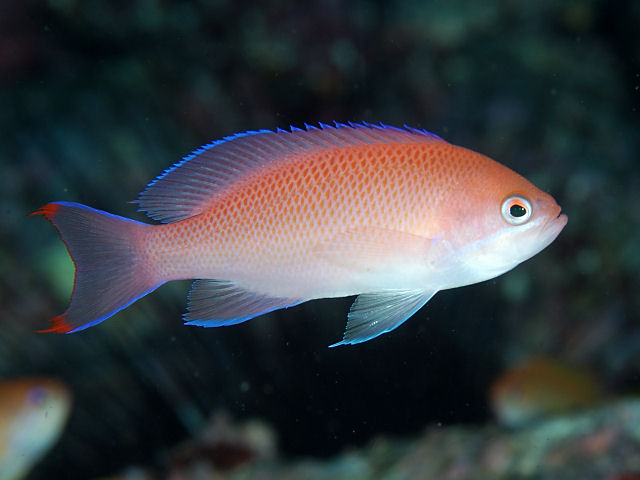
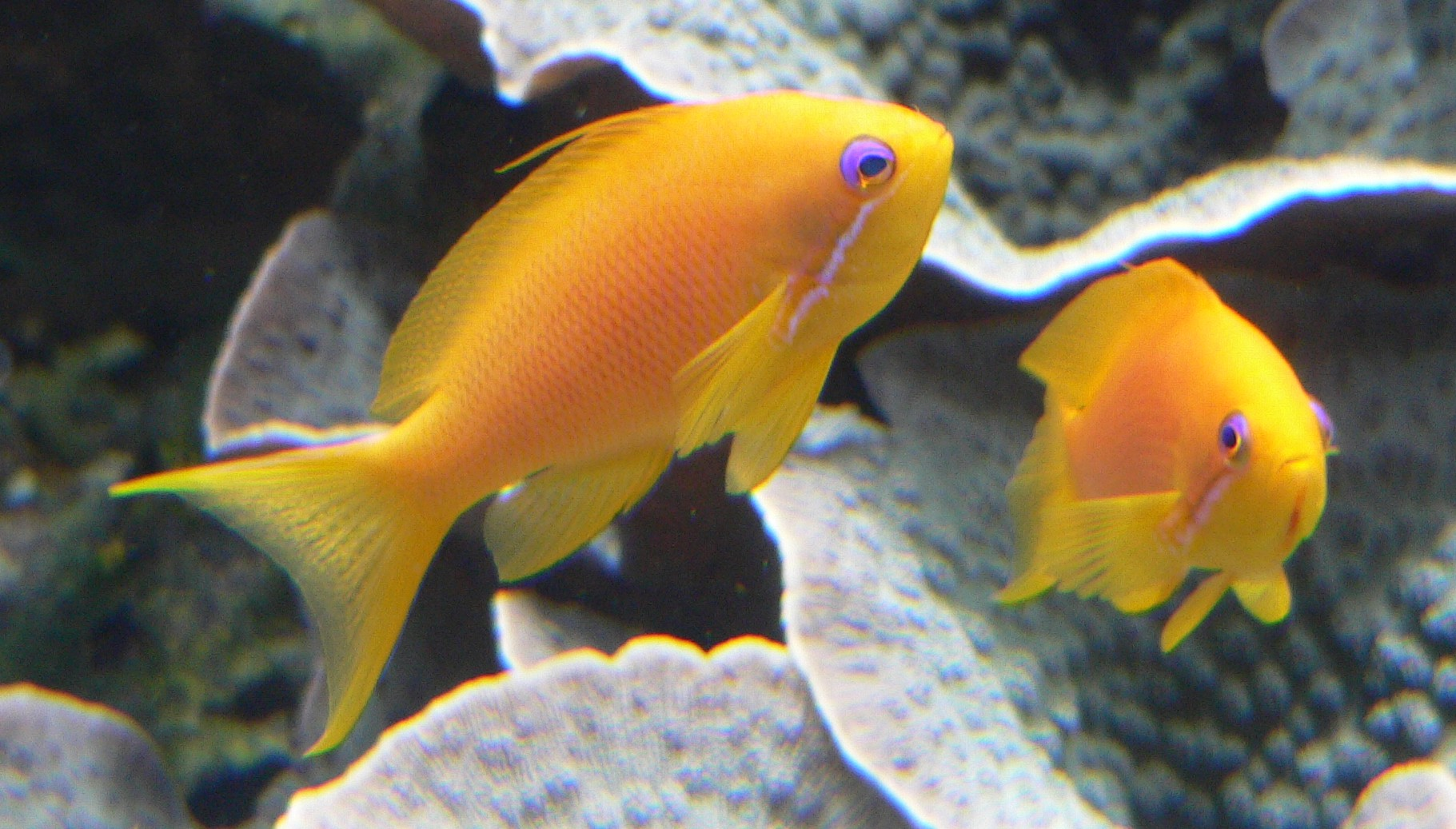
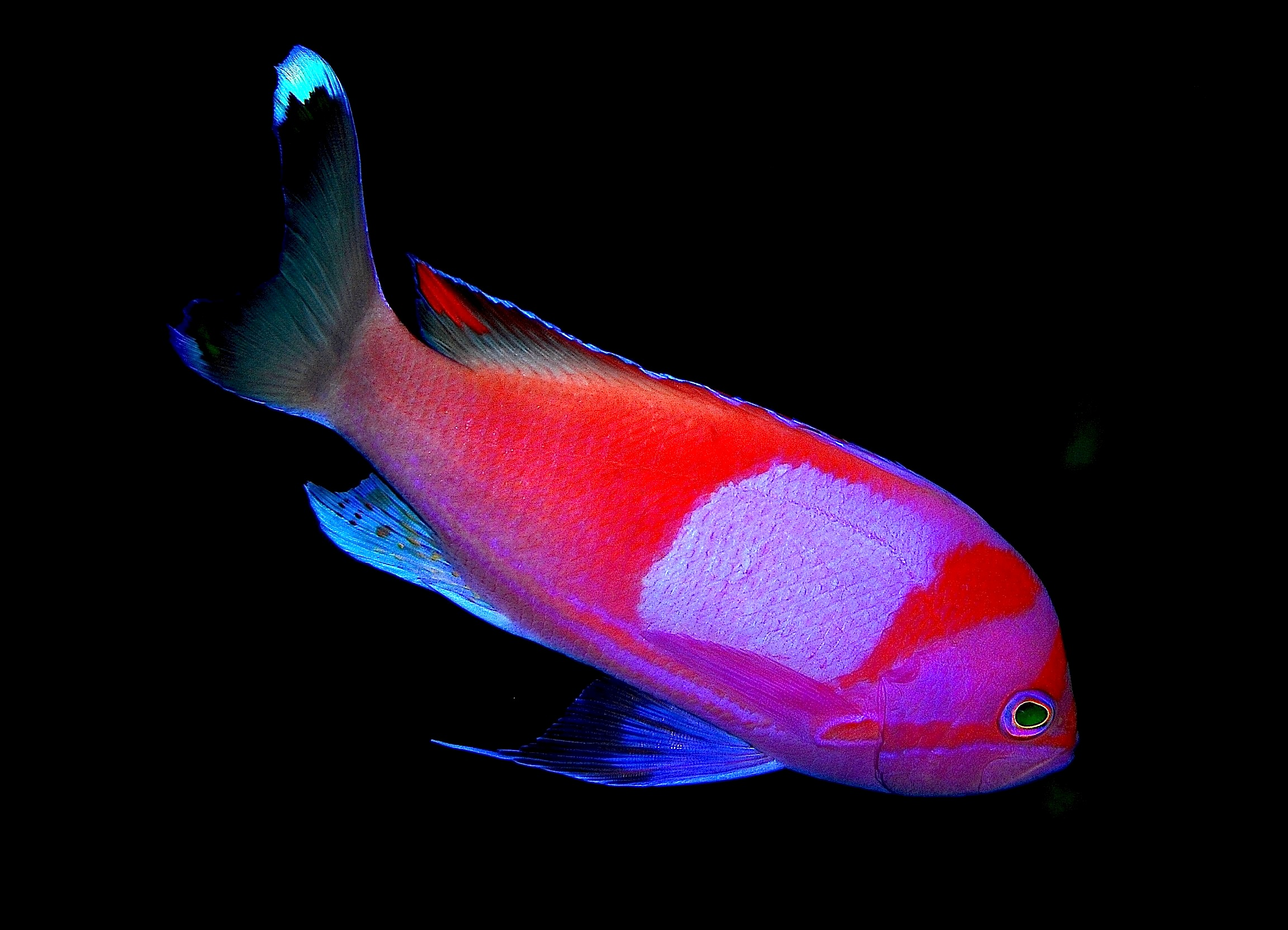
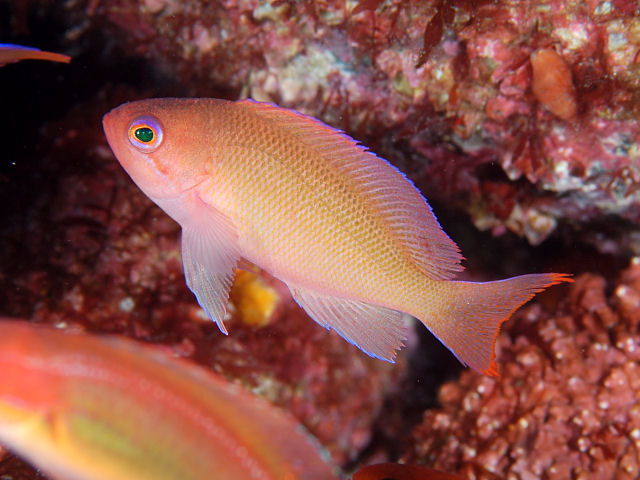
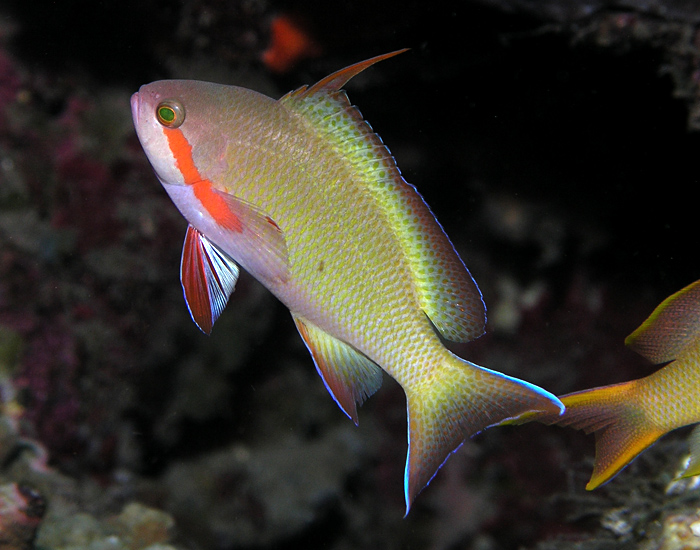
Common name	Image	Taxonomy	Reef safe	Description	Max size
Bartlett's anthias		Pseudanthias bartlettorum	Yes	Back and face light yellow, underside pink with a swallowtail-shaped caudal fin.	9 cm (3.5 in)
Bicolor anthias		Pseudanthias bicolor	Yes	Similarly shaped and coloured to Bartlett's Anthias, but with a slightly more rounded back.	13 cm (5.1 in)
Cooper's anthias		Pseudanthias cooperi	Yes	Orange back and finnage with white patch below the mouth running down toward the anal fin with pink sides.	14 cm (5.5 in)
Diadem anthias		Pseudanthias parvirostris	Yes	Pink fish with yellow streak on top of head running along the lateral line. Caudal fin is red with yellow tips.	7 cm (2.8 in)
Orangehead anthias		Pseudanthias heemstrai	Yes	Pink underside with orange back and mask, dark red splotch on caudal fin, along with iridescent blue anal and pelvic fins.	13 cm (5.1 in)
Redbar anthias		Pseudanthias rubrizonatus	Yes	Tannish-pink with a single vertical red stripe and a dorsal fin with the skin between the rays pulled back like on a lionfish.	12 cm (4.7 in)
Lyretail anthias, Sea Goldie		Pseudanthias squamipinnis	Yes	Females are orange with lyre-shaped caudal fin. Males are fuchsia with red markings on fins	15 cm (5.9 in)
Squareback anthias		Pseudanthias pleurotaenia	Yes	Red back and pink underside with distinctive blue square shaped marking and blue fins.	20 cm (7.9 in)
Stocky anthias		Pseudanthias hypselosoma	Yes	Orange back with cream colored underside. As its name suggests, slightly stockier than other Anthias.	19 cm (7.5 in)
Threadfin anthias		Pseudanthias huchtii	Yes	Olive green with black caudal fin and red stripe running from the eye to the pectoral fin.	12 cm (4.7 in)

== Bass and groupers ==
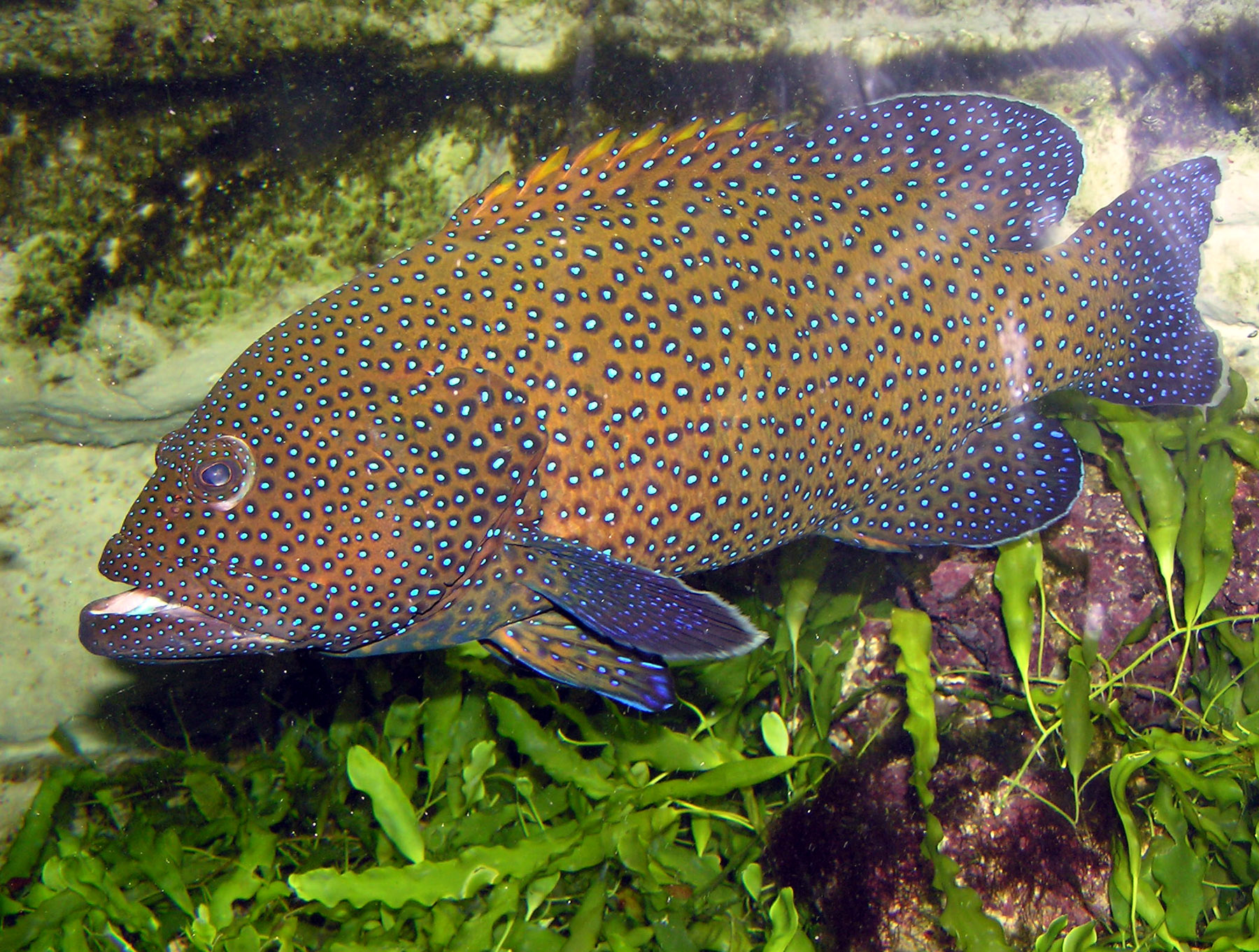
Blue dot grouper

In this exceedingly large group of fish, few are considered proper aquarium inhabitants, for various reasons including diet and size. Basses vary greatly from species to species. Appropriate research should be done before purchasing a specimen. Many unsuspecting hobbyists bring home cute little specimens of popular aquarium fish such as the lyretail grouper, only to realize several months later that they do not have the resources to care for a meter-long that may cost hundreds of dollars a month to feed.

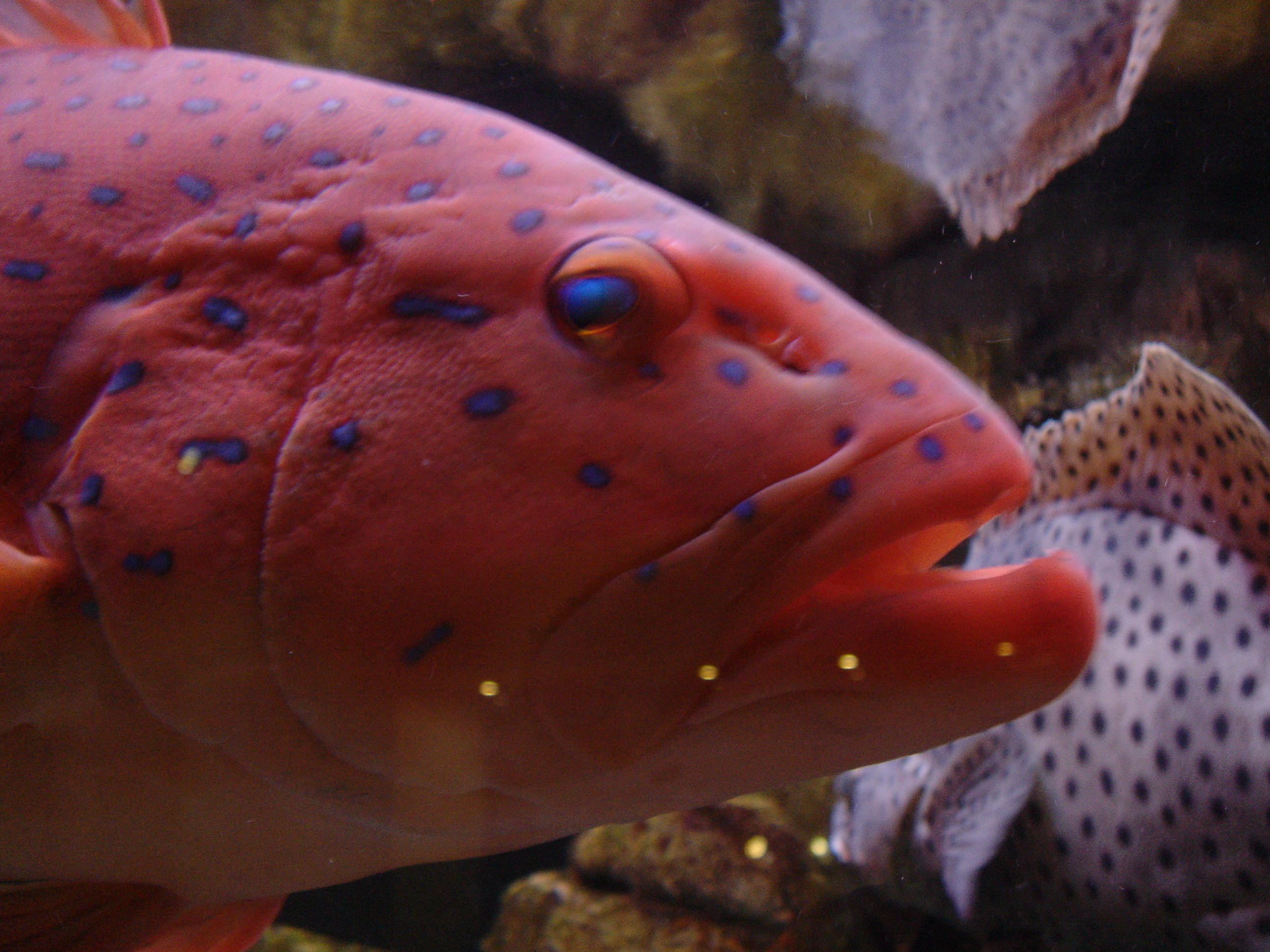
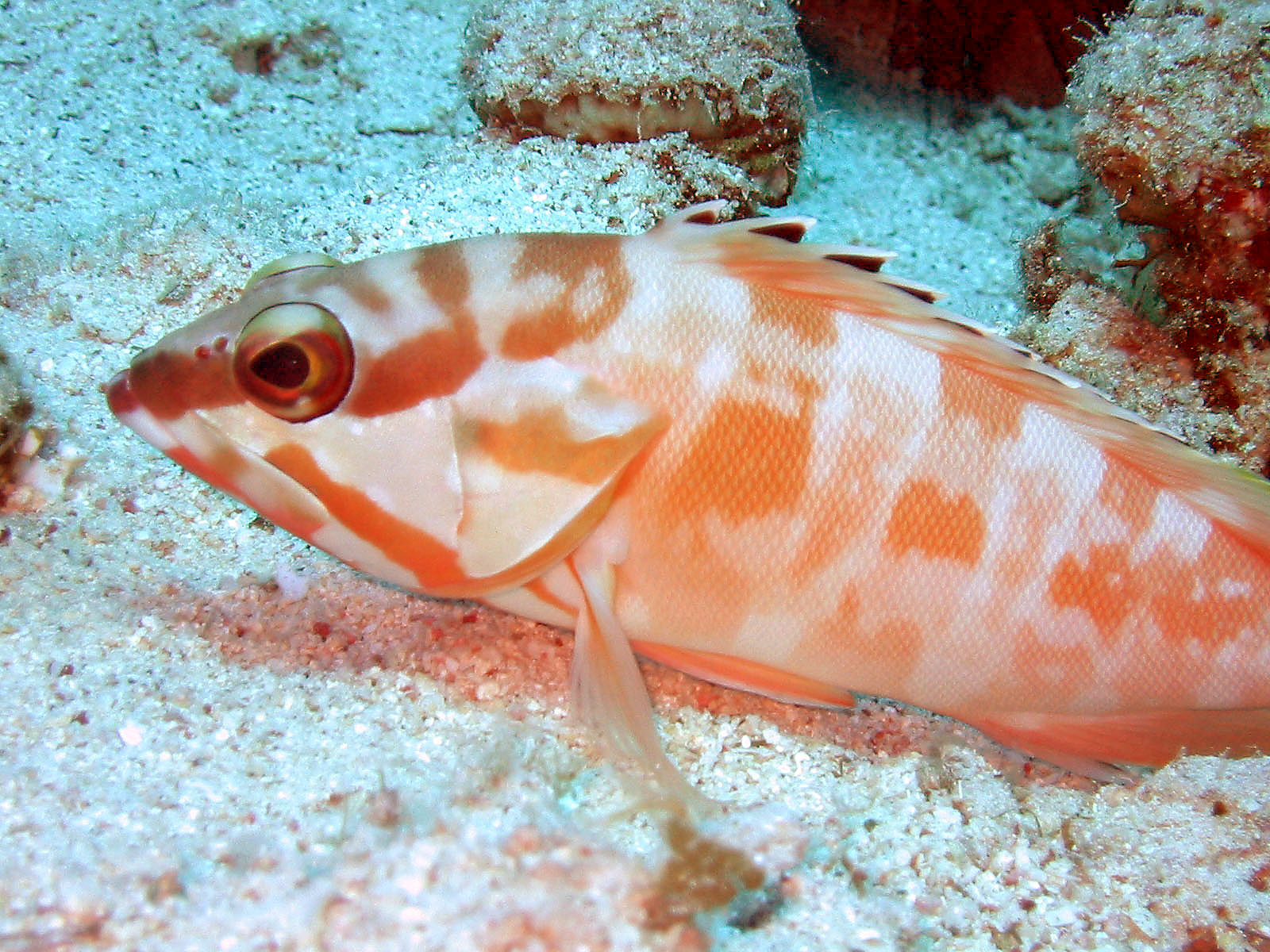
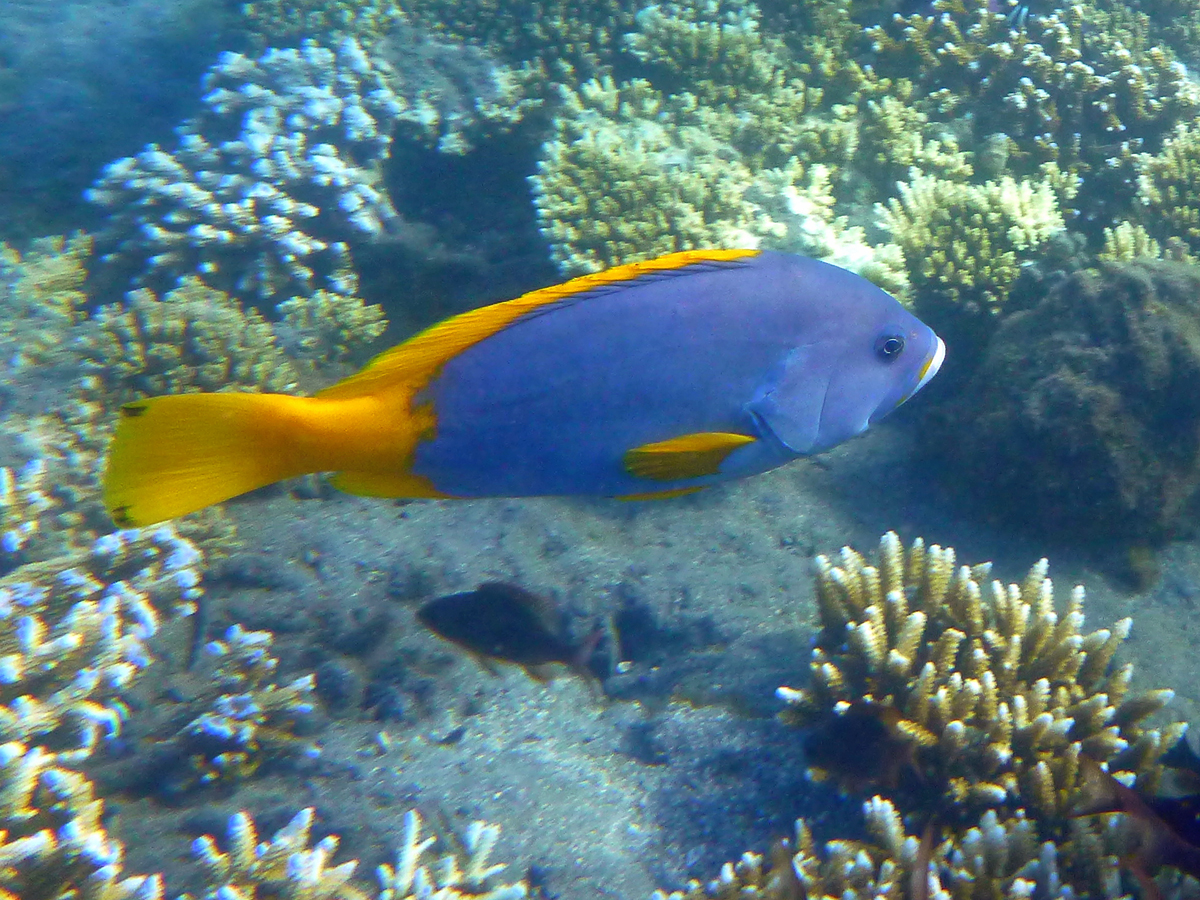
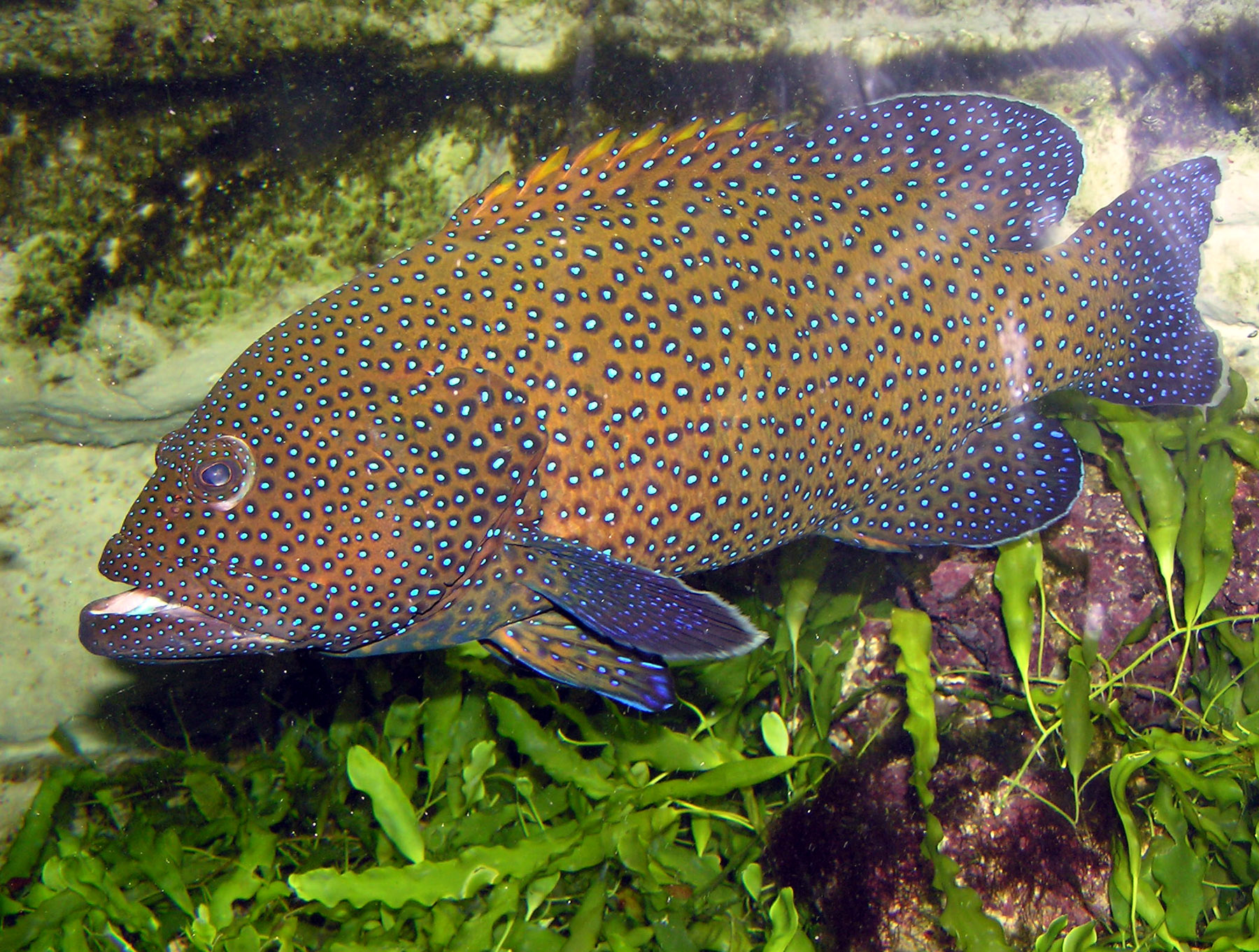
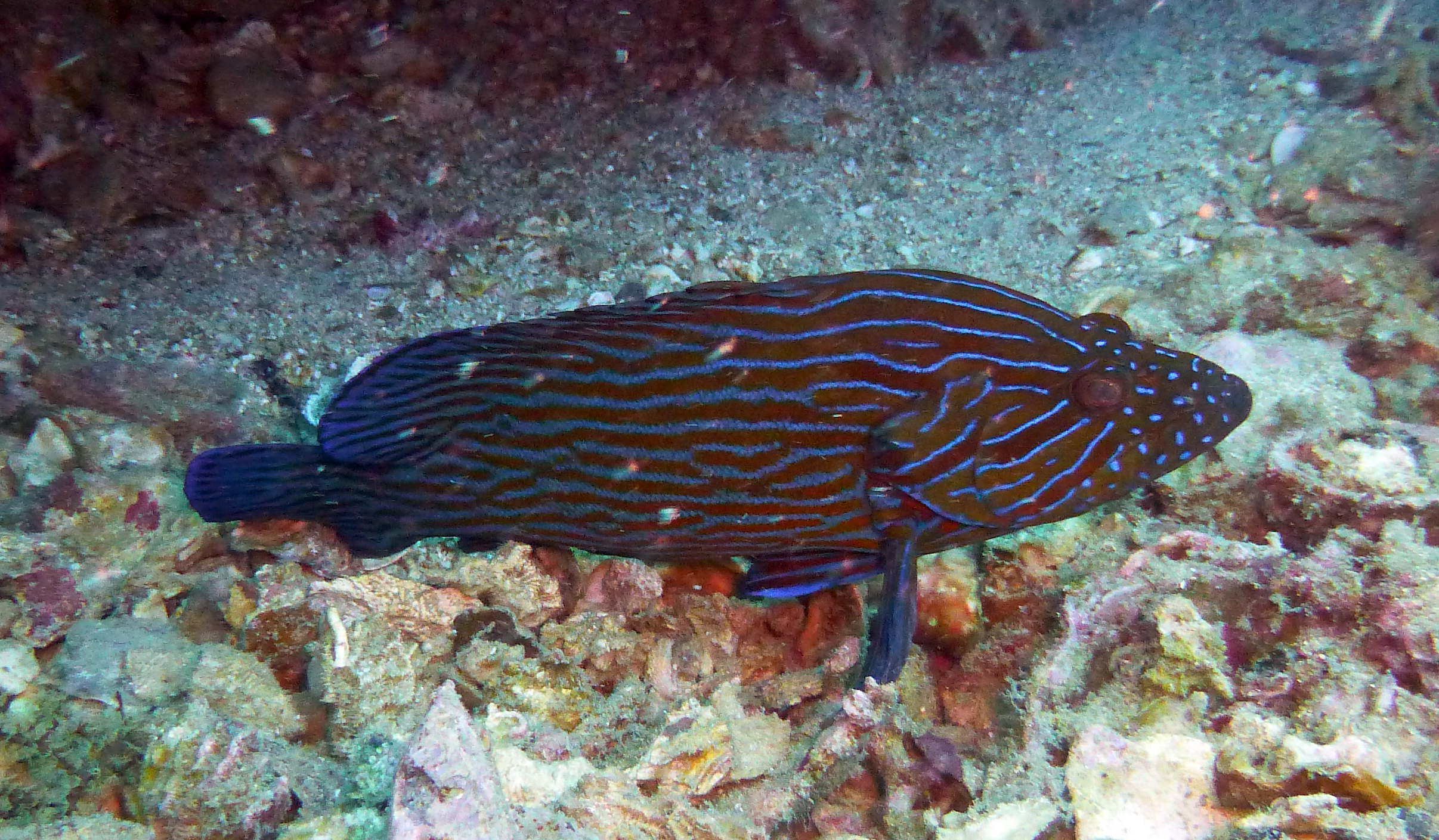
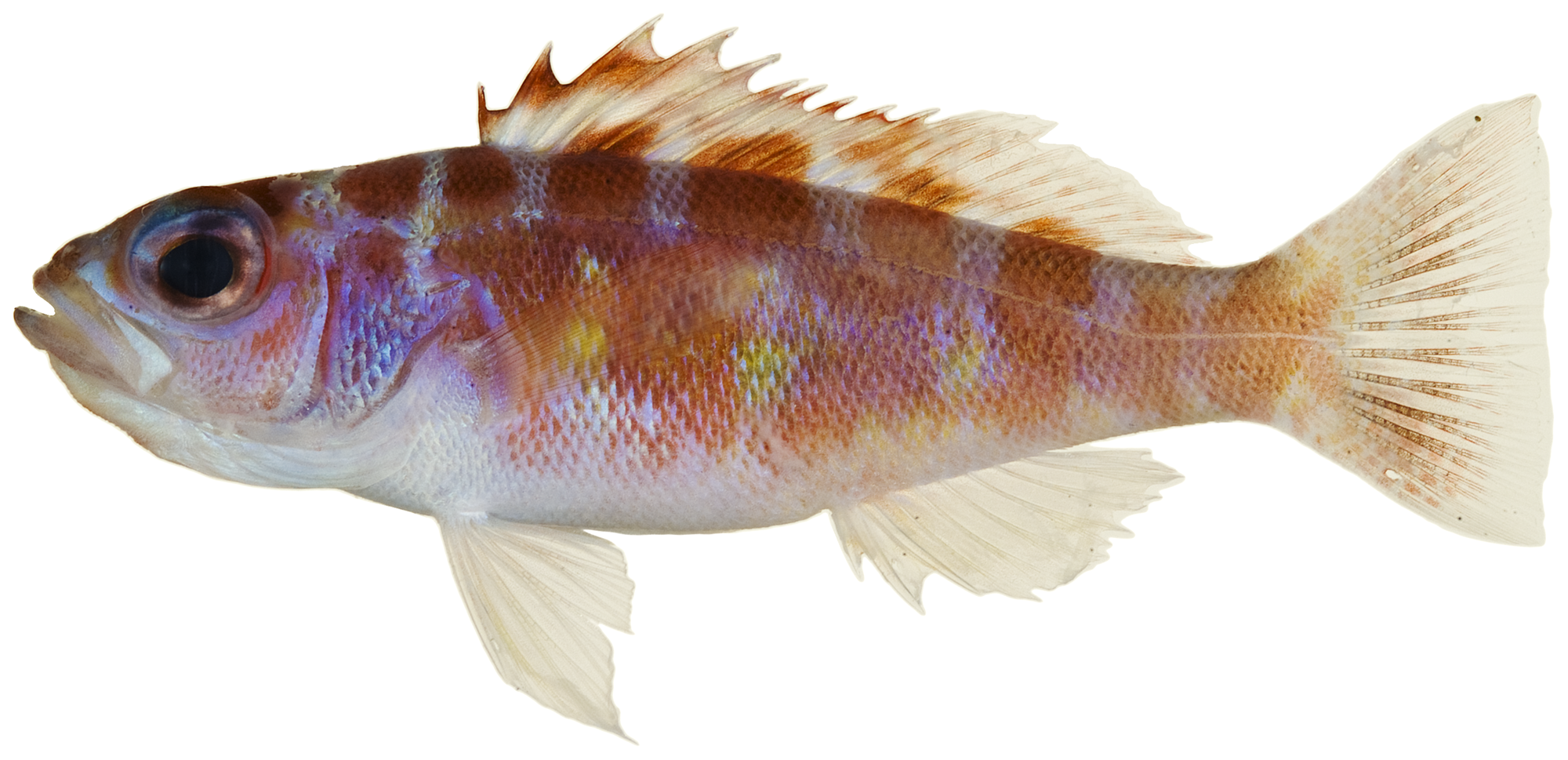
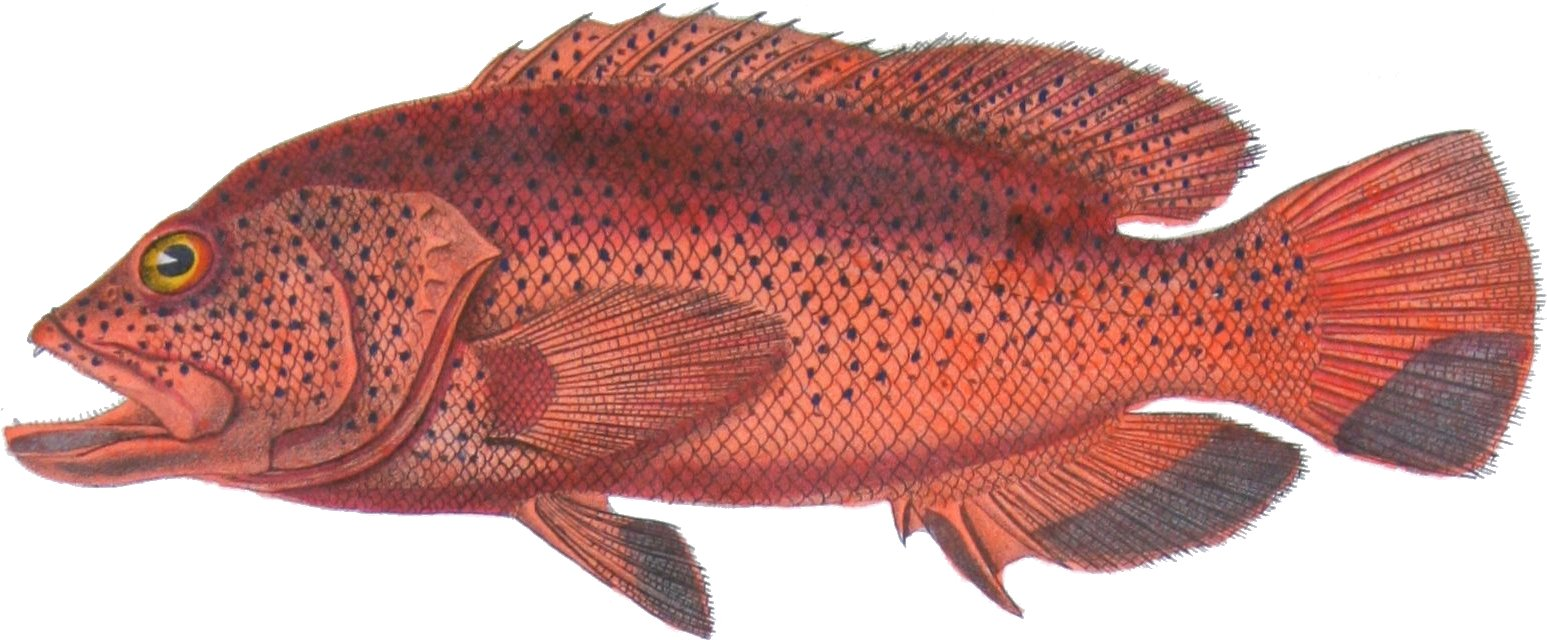
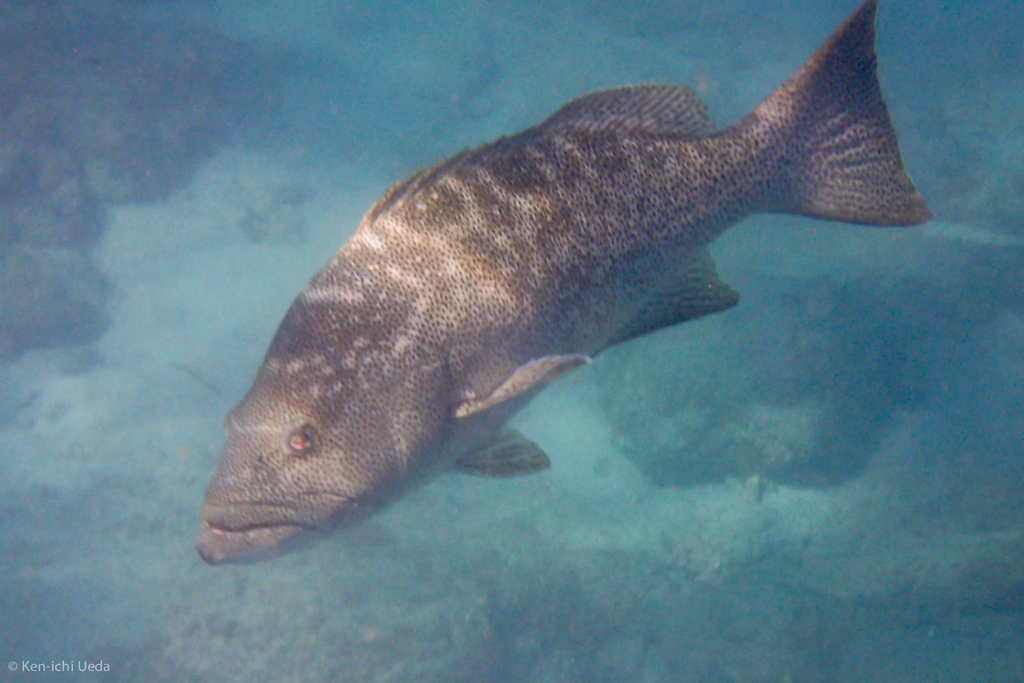
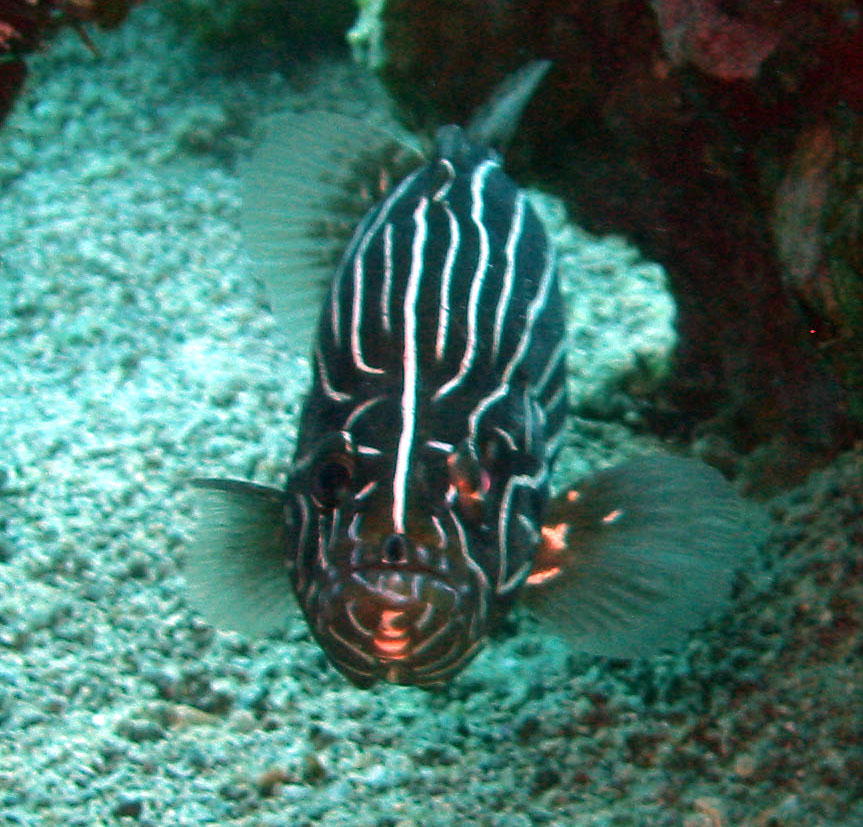
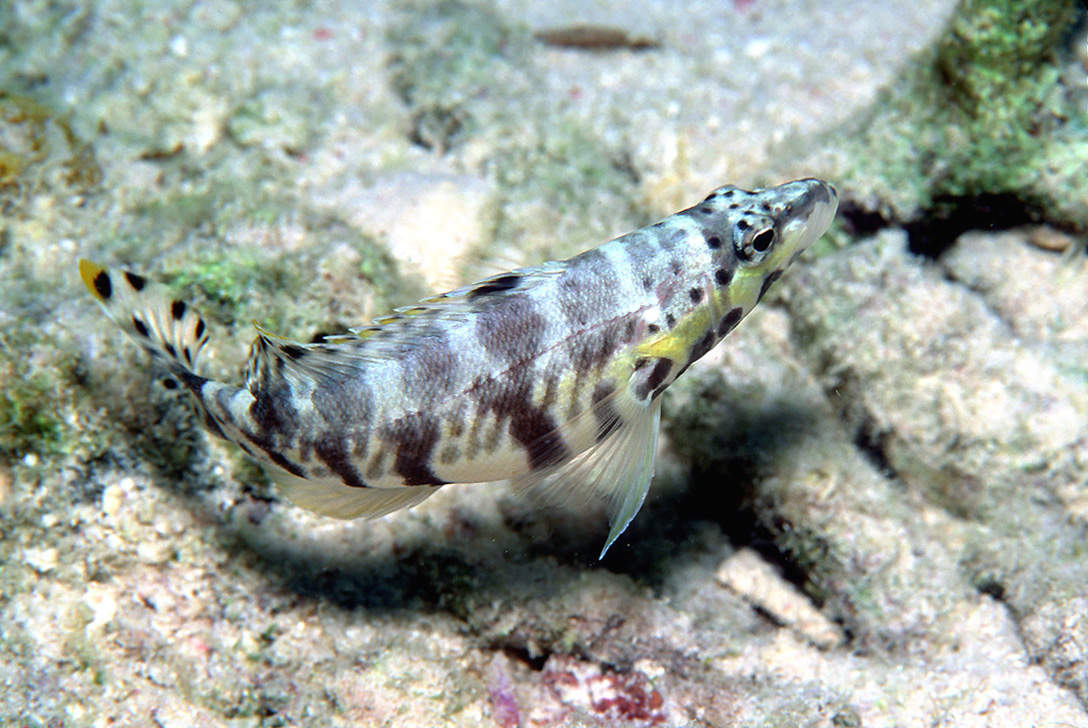
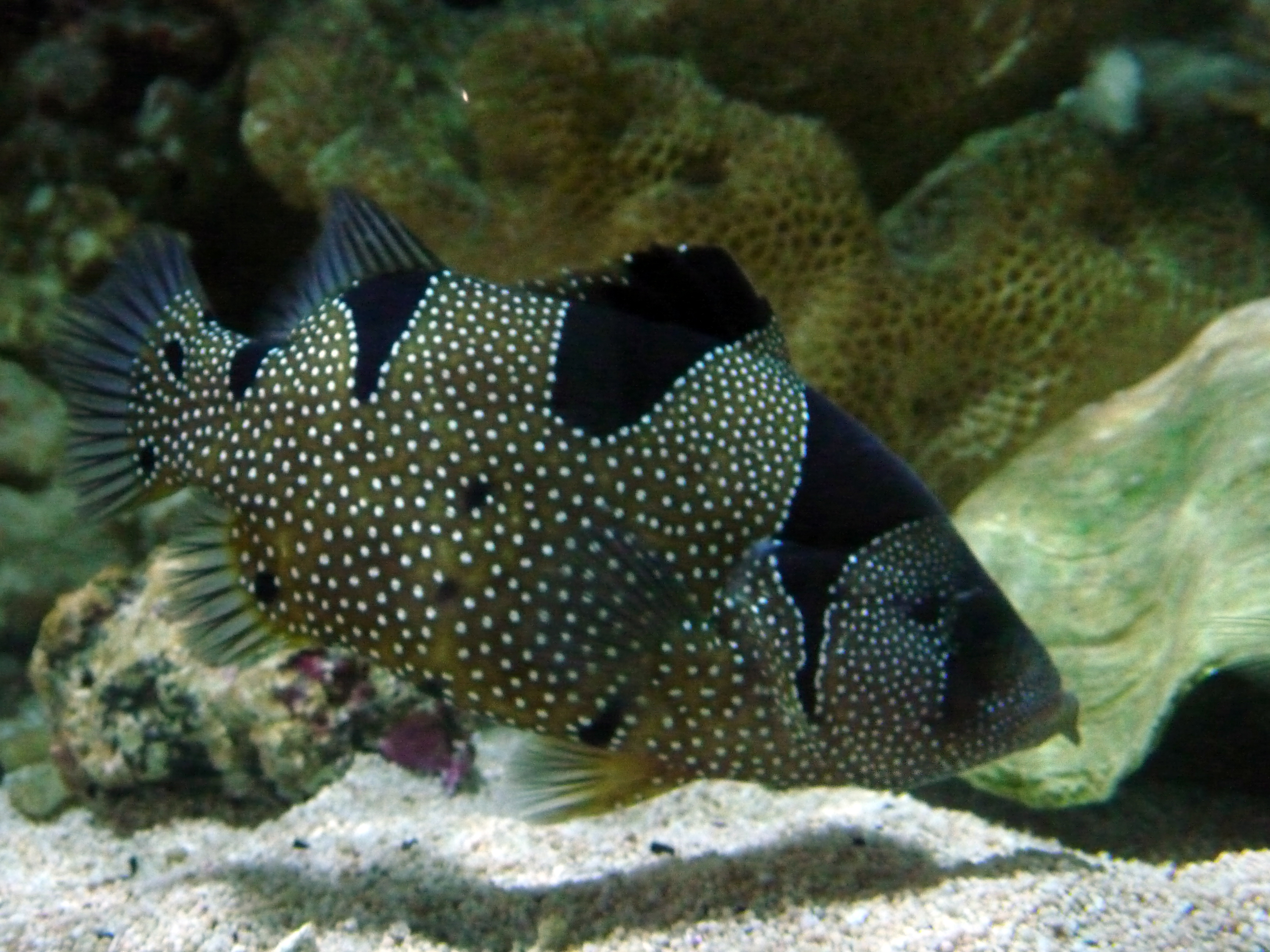
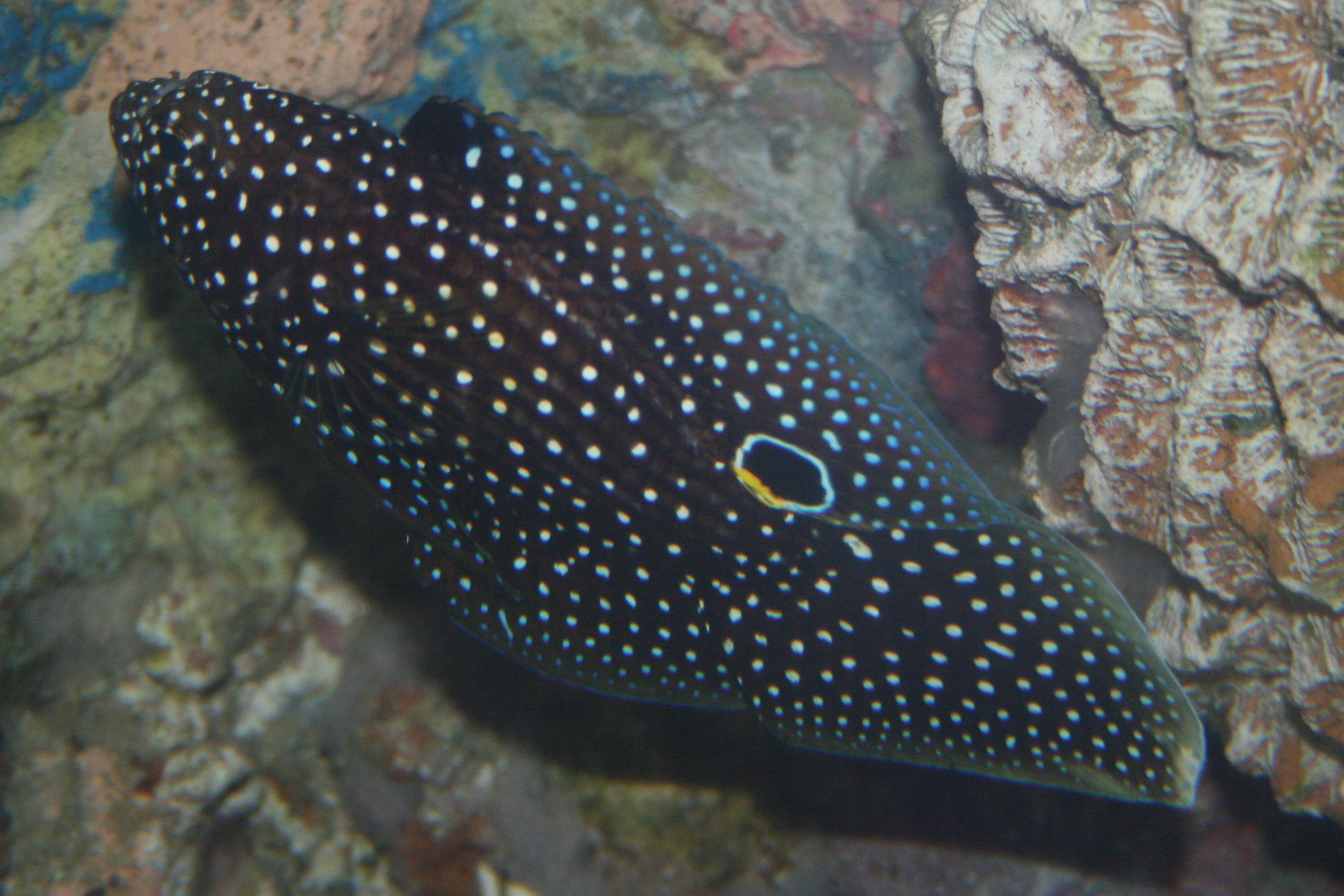
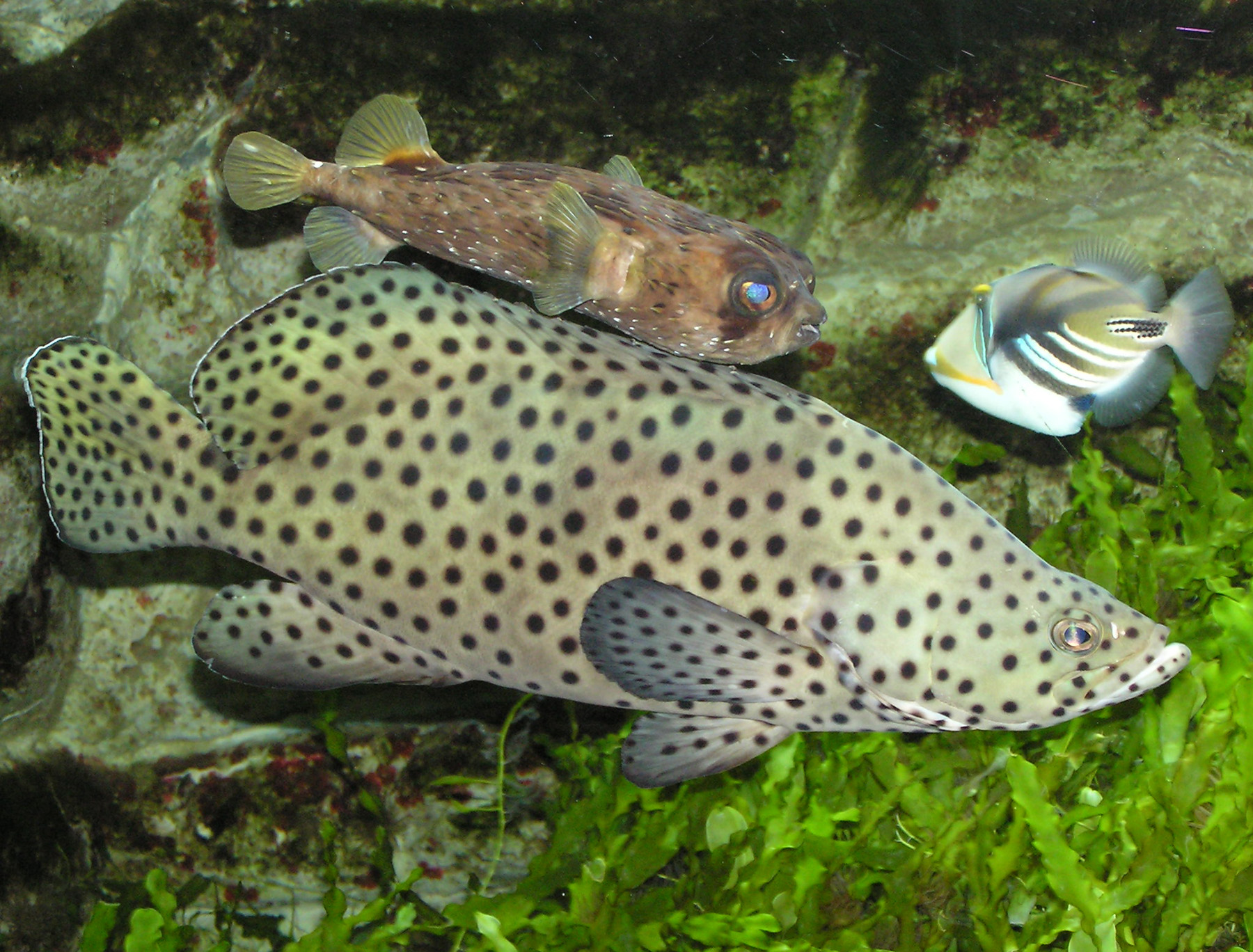
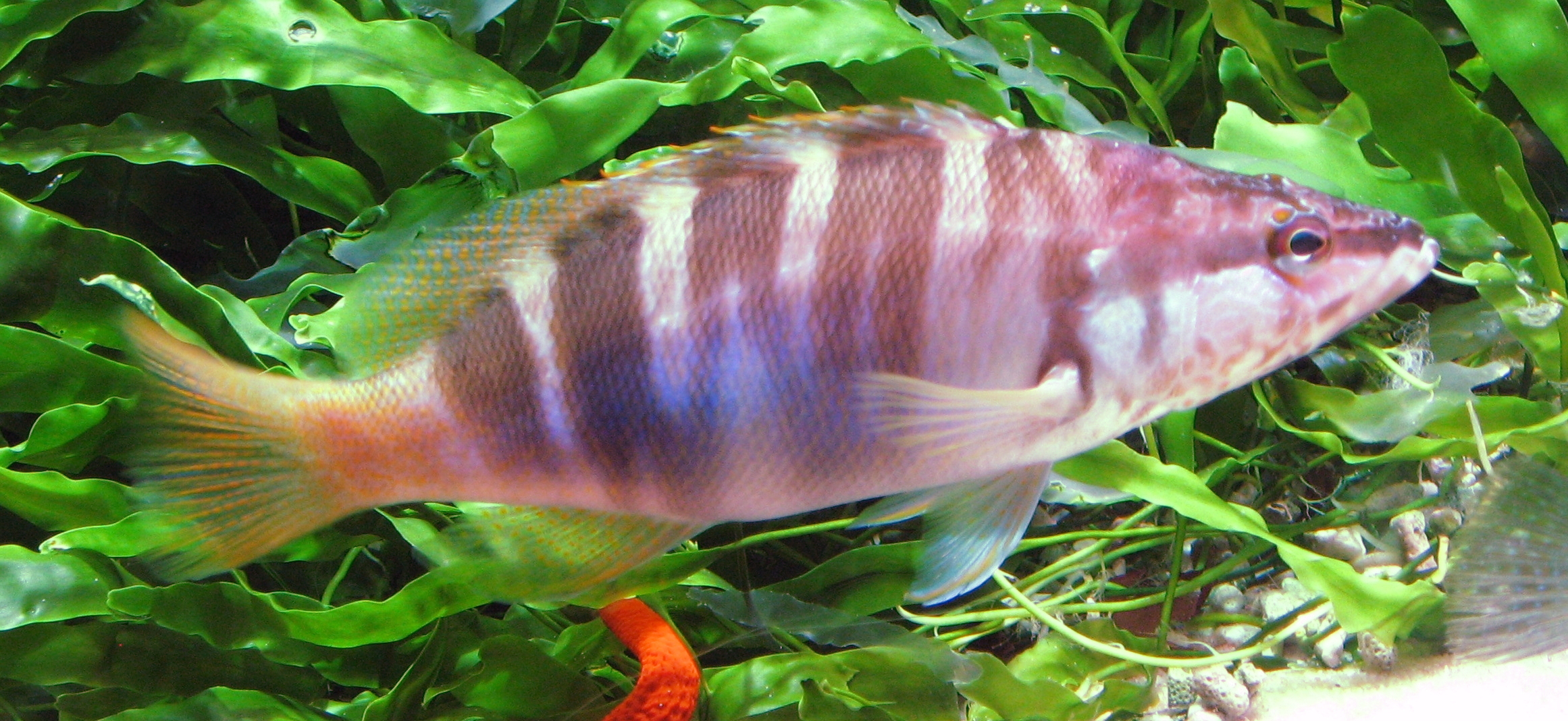
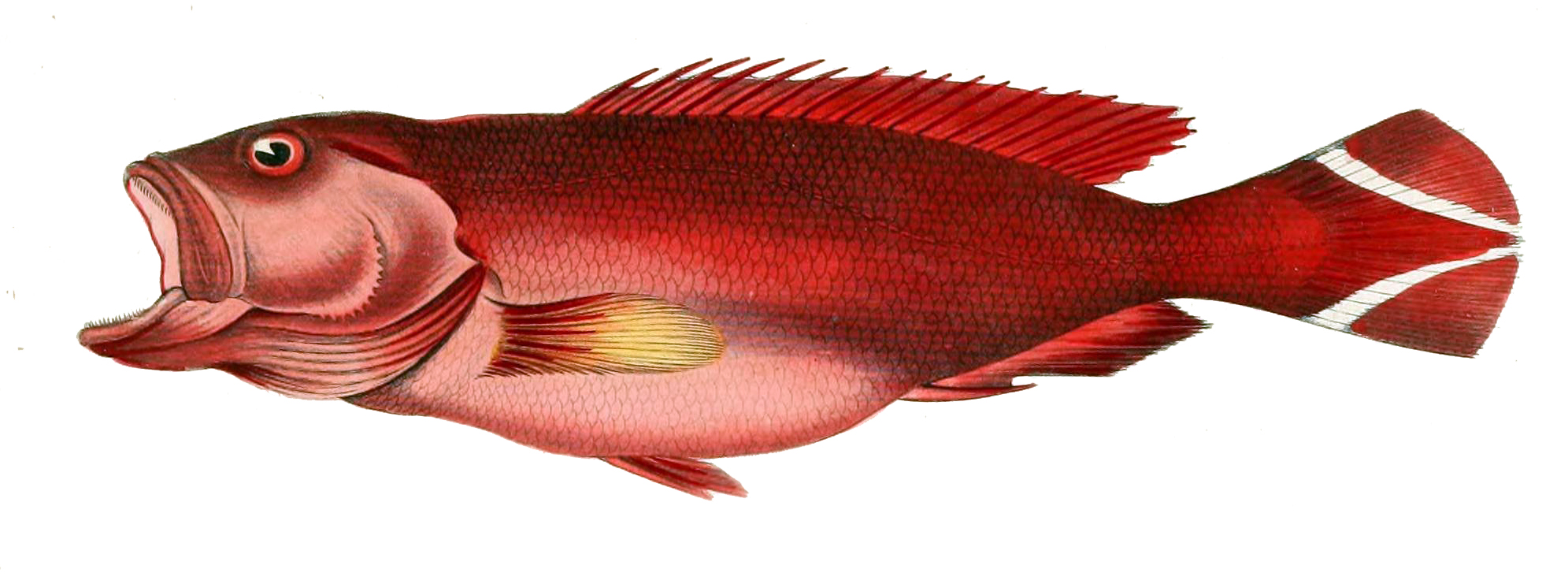
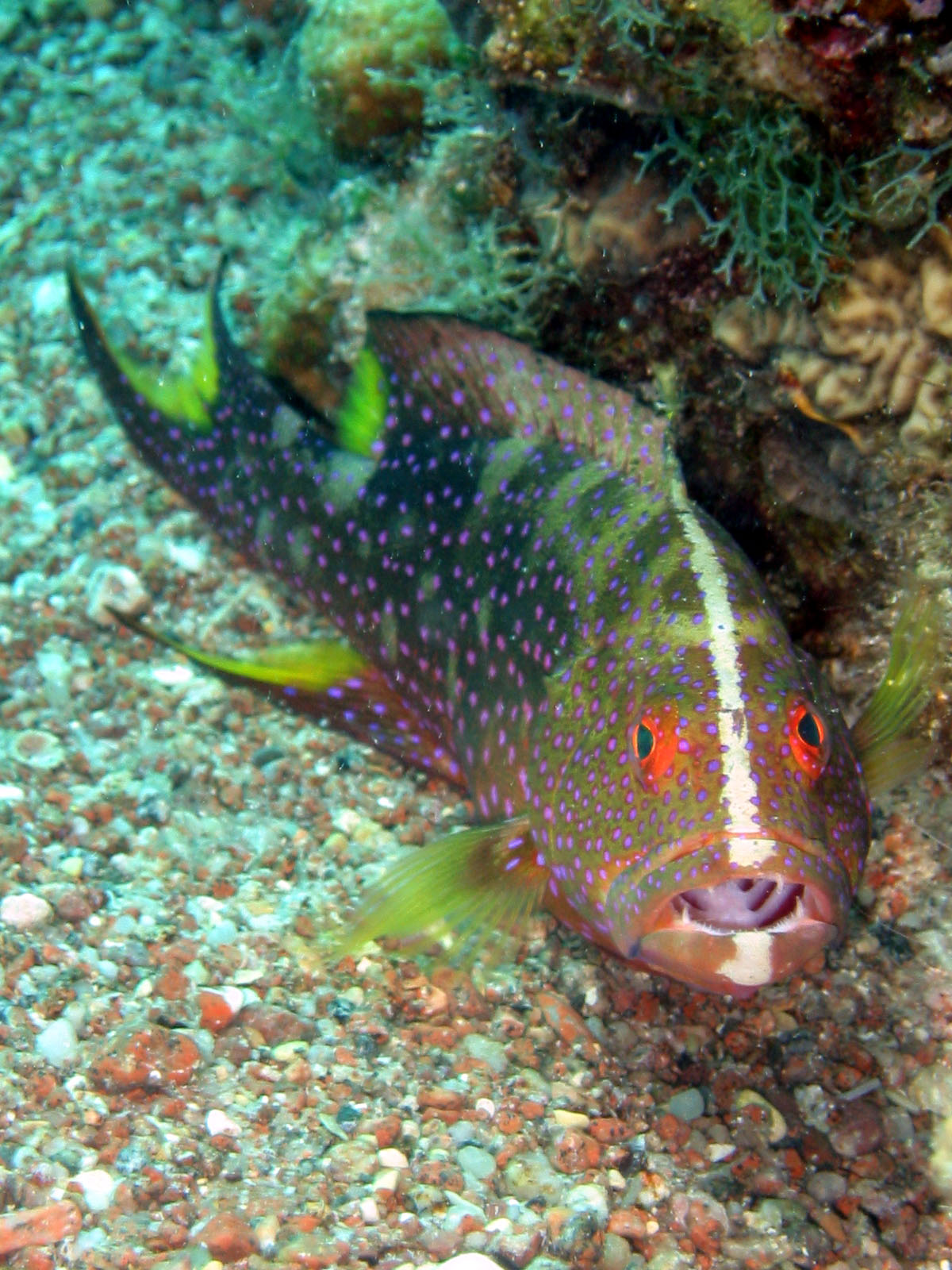
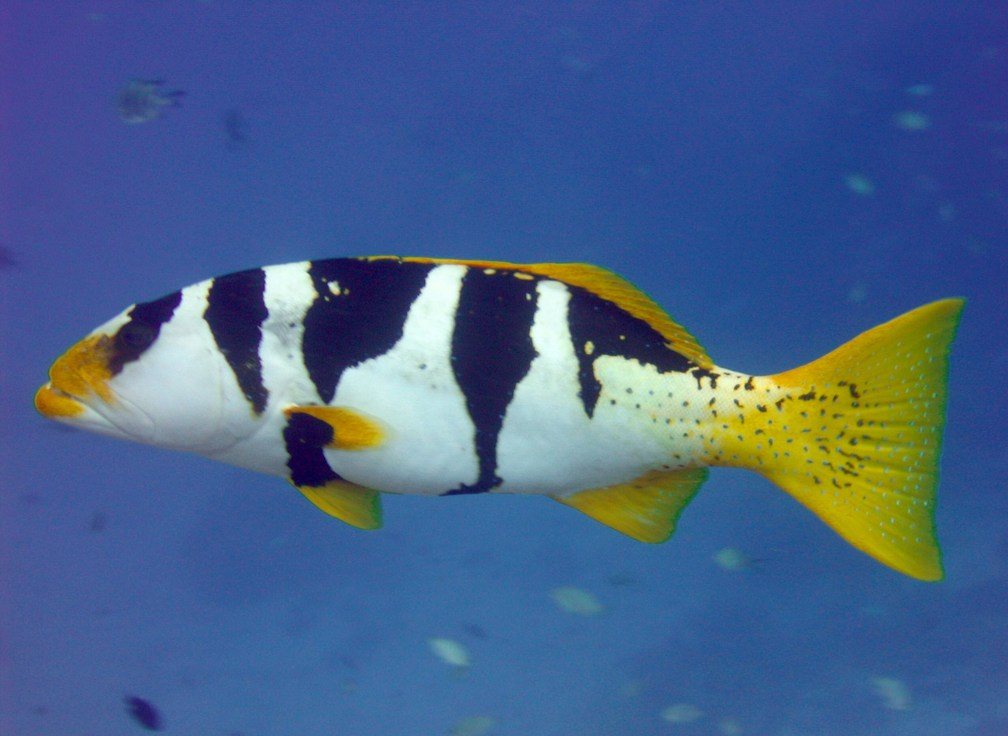
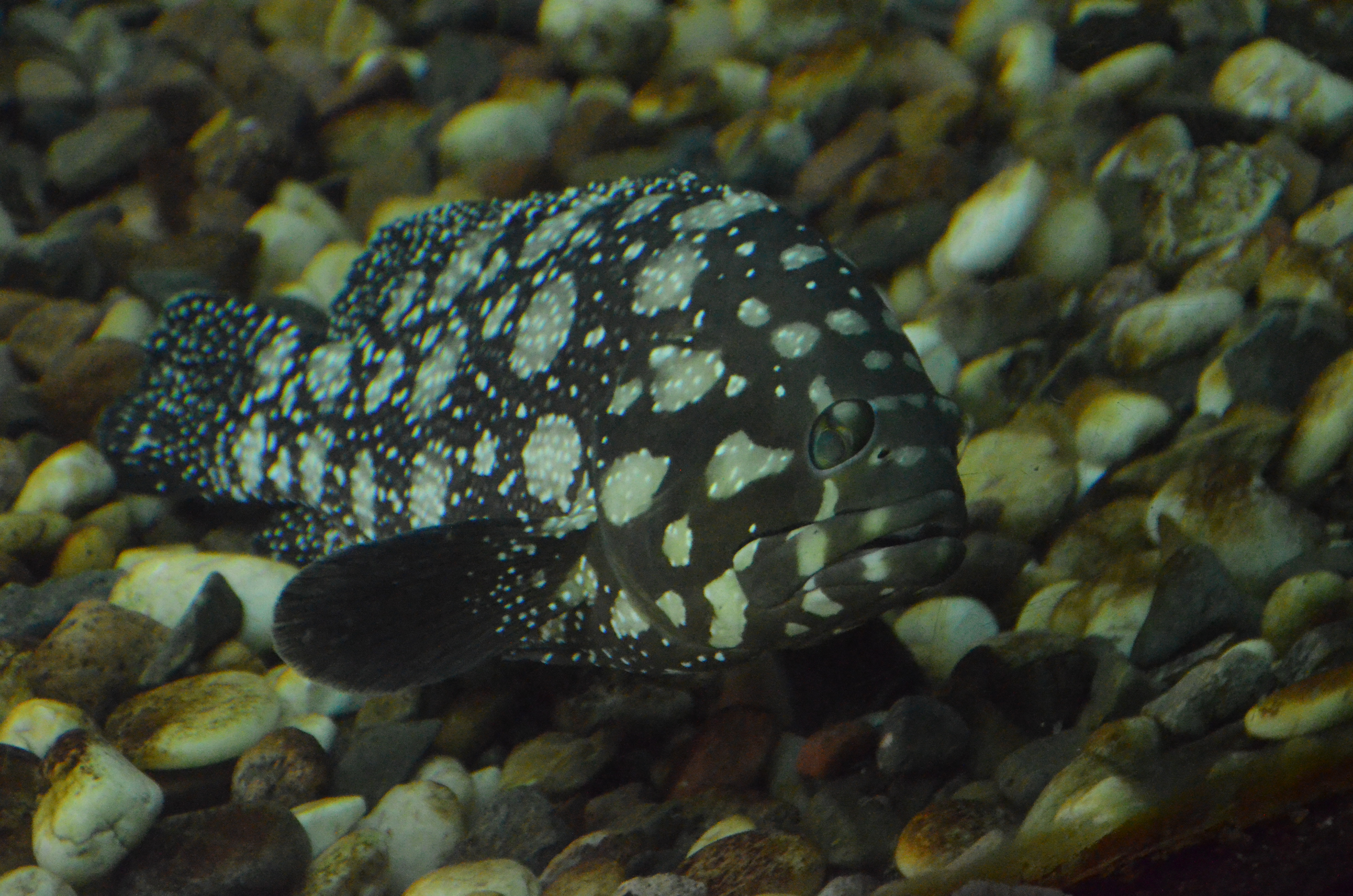
Common name	Image	Taxonomy	Reef safe	Description	Max size
African grouper		Cephalopholis taeniops	No		69 cm (27.2 in)
Vermillion seabass		Cephalopholis miniata			50 cm (19.7 in)
Blacktip grouper		Epinephelus fasciatus	No	The tips of the spines of the dorsal fin are black, and it may have a dark red cap above the eyes. There is a variant with a uniformly pale body except for the frontal part.	40 cm (15.7 in)
Blue and Yellow grouper		Epinephelus flavocaeruleus	No		90.0 cm (35.4 in)
Blue dot grouper		Cephalopholis argus	No	Deep black to tan fish with blue spots throughout.	50 cm (19.7 in)
Blue line grouper		Cephalopholis formosa	No	Dark tan with horizontal blue stripes that are not particularly straight. The caudal fin has more of these stripes, and they radiate from the base of the fin out to the tips.	34 cm (13.4 in)
Chalk bass		Serranus tortugarum	Yes	Blue iridescent body with distinctive black topside that is interrupted by small vertical blue stripes.	8 cm (3.1 in)
Coney grouper		Cephalopholis fulva	No		41 cm (16.1 in)
Golden grouper		Mycteroperca rosacea	No		86 cm (33.9 in)
Golden stripe soapfish		Grammistes sexlineatus	No	Chocolate brown with light yellow horizontal stripes. Similar in patterning to C. argus (with exception to the coloration).	30 cm (11.8 in)
Harlequin bass		Serranus tigrinus	Yes	Very striking black and white checkerboard pattern all over, with very long tapering nose.	29 cm (11.4 in)
Leaflip grouper		Pogonoperca punctata	No	Sports a large, hinged mouth and is tan with little spots. Has brown triangle shaped markings down the spine.	35 cm (13.8 in)
Marine beta		Calloplesiops altivelis	Yes		15 cm (5.9 in)
Pacific graysby		Cephalopholis panamensis	No		30 cm (11.8 in)
Panther grouper		Cromileptes altivelis	No	Gorgeous pure white fish with black spots and a distinctive "hump" on the head, leading to a popular common name, "Humpback Grouper".	75 cm (29.5 in)
Painted comber		Serranus scriba	No	Large fish with classic Bass body, Silvery in colour with vertical tan stripes and a blue underside.	36 cm (14.2 in)
Polleni grouper		Cephalopholis polleni	No		43 cm (16.9 in)
Red flag grouper		Cephalopholis urodeta	No	Very similar to C. miniatus, but the caudal fin is dark.	28 cm (11.0 in)
Lyretail grouper		Variola louti	No	Silver back changing to red around the underside, darkening toward the caudal fin, which is lyre-shaped with neon green edging.	80 cm (31.5 in)
Saddle grouper		Plectropomus laevis	No		125 cm (49.2 in)
Spotted grouper		Epinephelus summana	No	Dark black fish with many light green spots all over body, increasing in number toward the posterior.	52 cm (20.5 in)
Strawberry grouper		Cephalopholis spiloparaea	No		30 cm (11.8 in)
V tail grouper		Cephalopholis urodelus	No		28 cm (11.0 in)

== Basslets and assessors ==
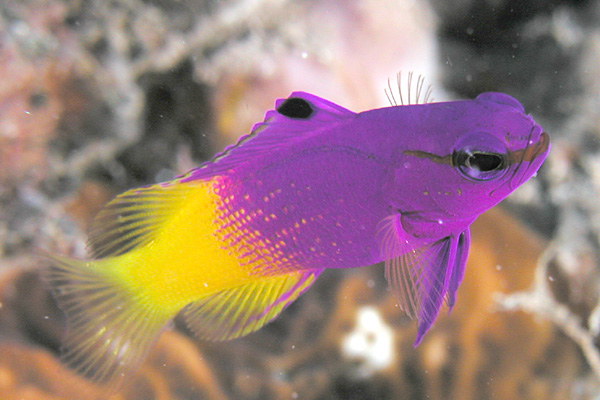
Royal gramma

Basslets and Assessors are small, long bodied fish strongly resembling Anthias. Their care requirements, however, are closer to those of damsels. They should be kept individually, and generally not with other fish of similar shape and colour. Feeding is easy: they will generally eat any meaty foods offered. Good water quality should be maintained at all times.

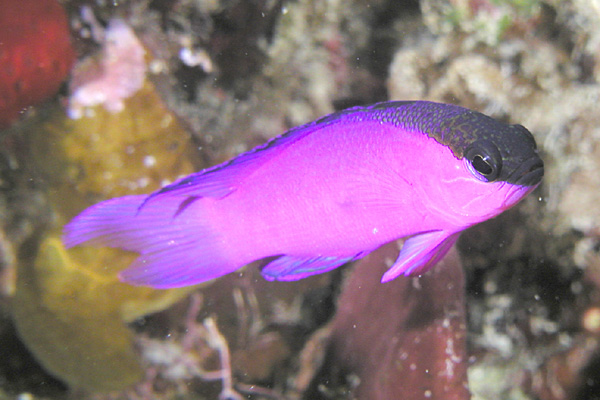
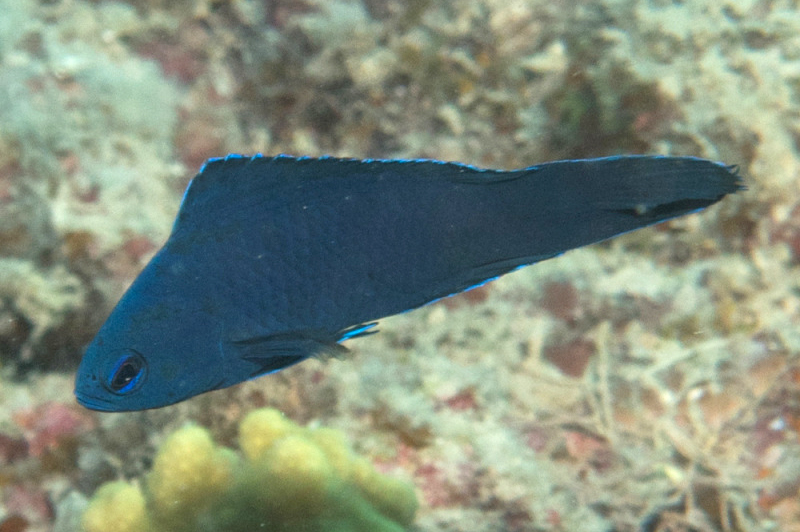
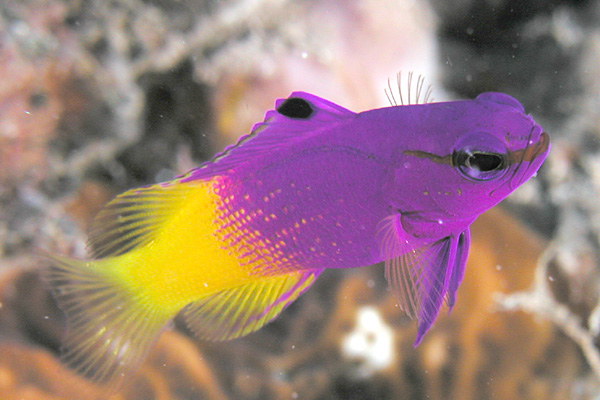
Common name	Image	Taxonomy	Reef safe	Description	Max size
Black cap gramma		Gramma melacara	Yes	Purple with a black mask beginning at the mouth and ending at the base of the dorsal fin.	6 cm (2.4 in)
Blue assessor		Assessor macneilli	Yes	Entirely navy blue with white edging of the dorsal fin.	7 cm (2.8 in)
Royal gramma		Gramma loreto	Yes	Purple head and anterior, abruptly changing to yellow about halfway down the body. Has black marking through eye and another on the dorsal fin. Do not confuse with the Brazilian Gramma or the Bicolor Dottyback.	5 cm (2.0 in)
Brazilian gramma		Gramma brasiliensis	Yes	Very similar to the royal gramma, however the change from purple to yellow occurs farther down the body and the black markings are absent.	6 cm (2.4 in)
Yellow assessor		Assessor flavissimus	Yes	Bright lemon yellow with peach fringing of the dorsal fin and around the eye.	7 cm (2.8 in)

== Batfish ==
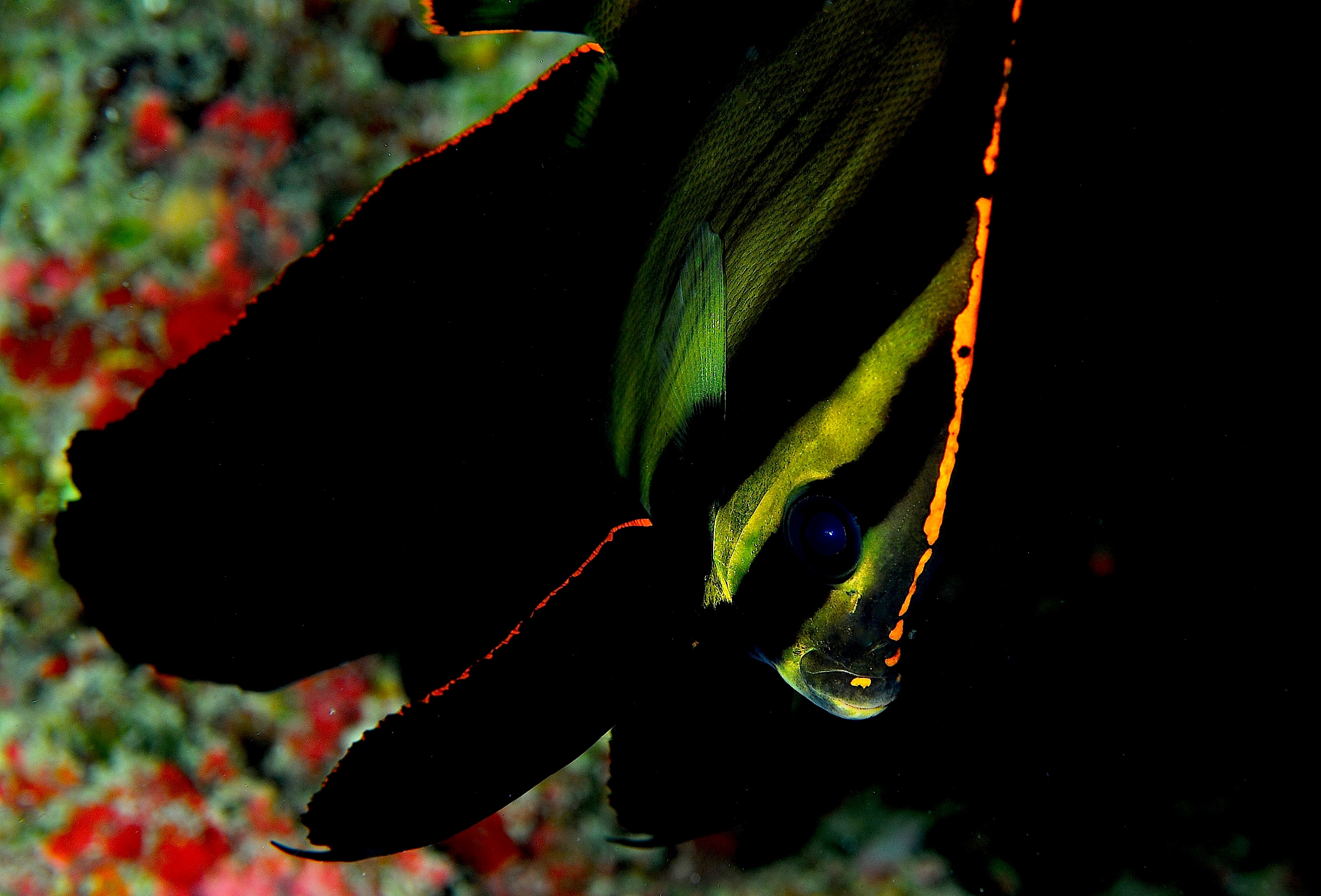
Dusky batfish

Batfish are gorgeous and striking fish that are not common in aquaria for one major reason: they get huge. A two or three hundred gallon tank is needed for one, minimum, and larger is better. They start out as tiny, manageable-looking cuties, which often fools aquarists into purchasing them for their small aquariums. However they quickly grow to gargantuan proportions, and require large amounts of food as well as space, so beware. They are not reef safe and should be fed plenty of large meaty foods. Batfish change greatly as they grow, however the potential aquarist is most likely to see them in their juvenile form, so that is the description of the colouration here. They all have generally the same body shape: disk-like with tall dorsal and anal fins, similar to a Freshwater Angelfish.

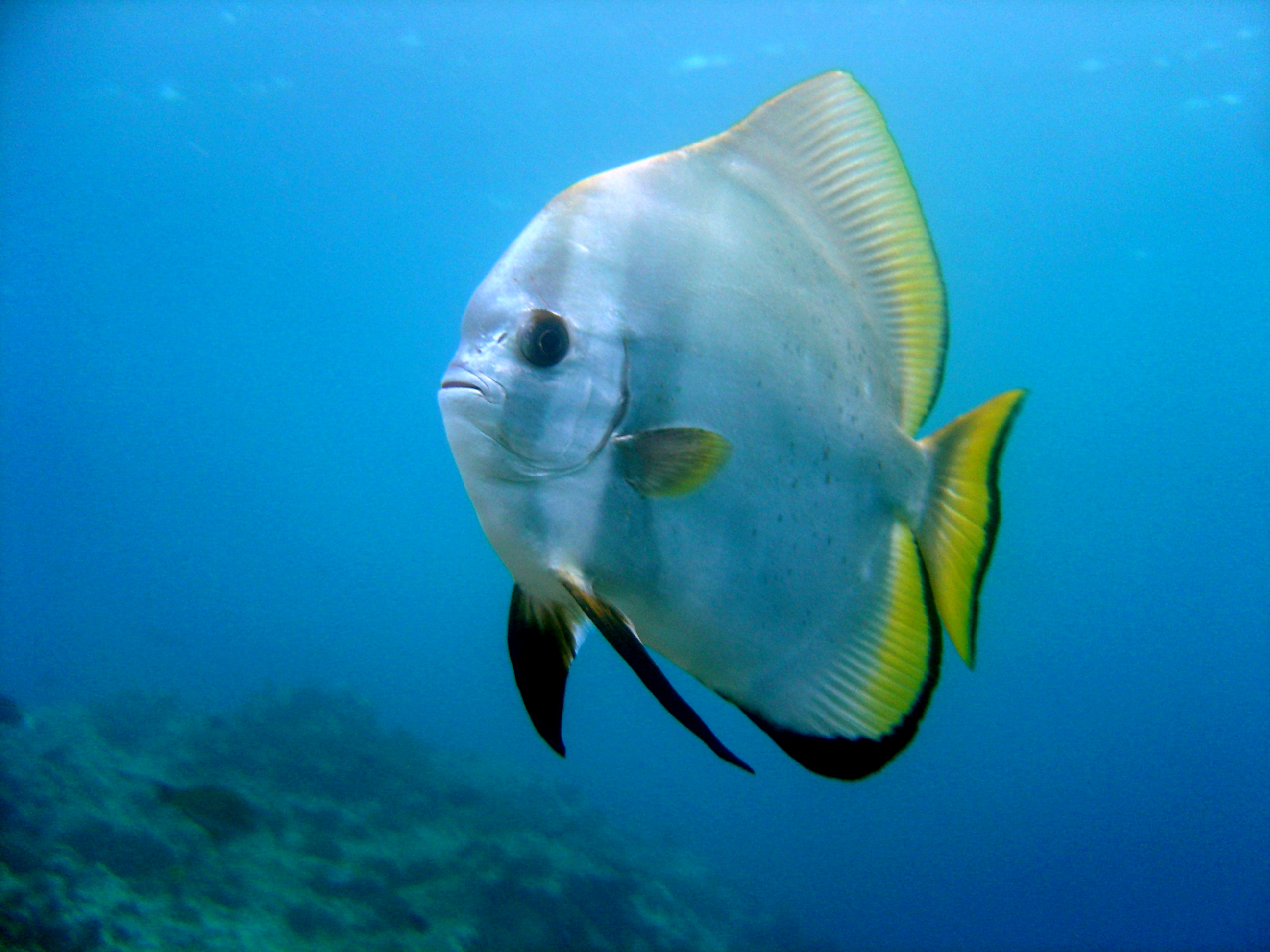
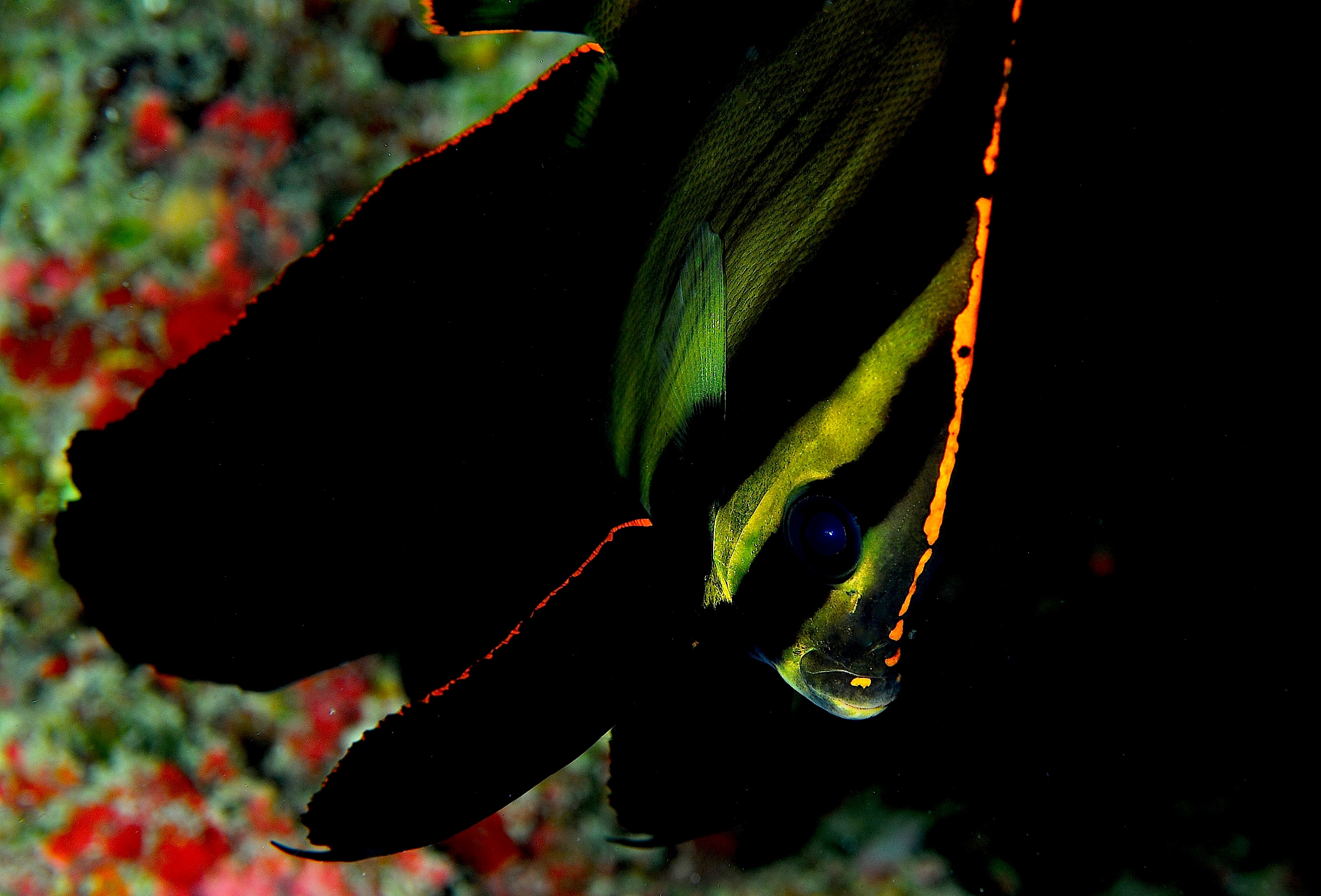
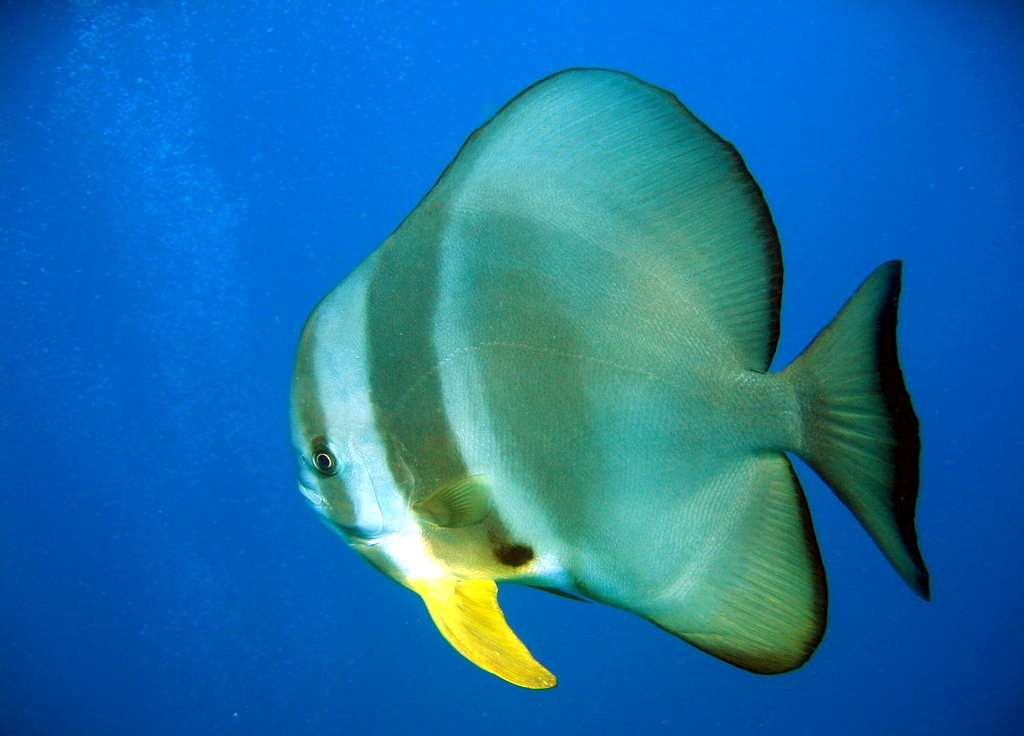
Common name	Image	Taxonomy	Reef safe	Description	Max size
Orbiculate batfish		Platax orbicularis	No	Brown with generally random black markings resembling a rotting leaf.	50 cm (19.7 in)
Dusky batfish		Platax pinnatus	No	Dark black body completely edged by distinctive yellow and orange.	45 cm (17.7 in)
Teira batfish		Platax teira	No	Silver with black fins and a black stripe across the face.	70 cm (27.6 in)

== Blennies and the Engineer Goby ==
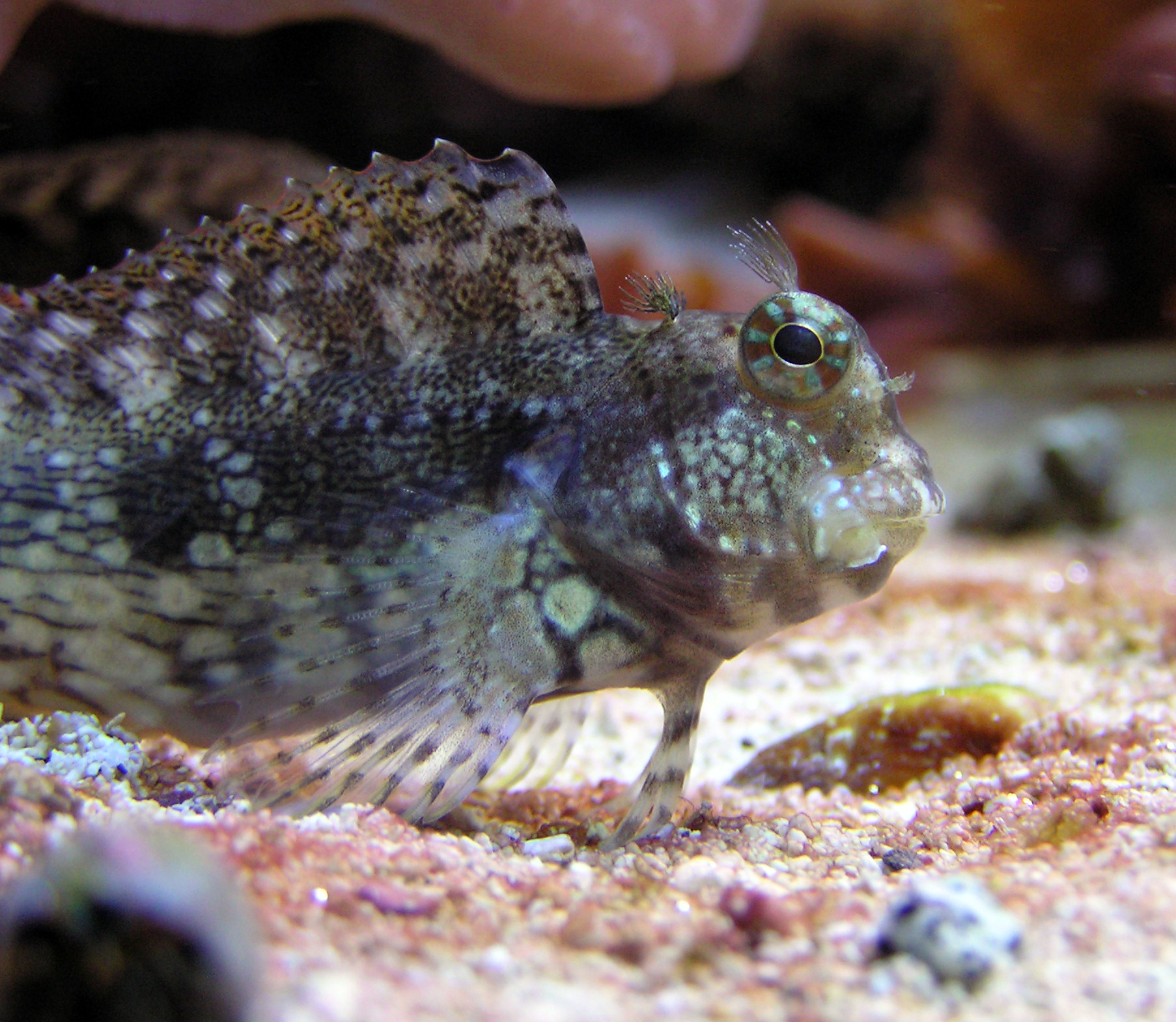
Lawnmower blenny

Blennies are popular aquarium fish, and for good reason. Most of them are peaceful to other fish, while very aggressive to other blennies which has a similar shape. Some blennies are colorful, and many are downright helpful. For example, the aptly named Lawnmower Blenny will keep your green algae well trimmed and presentable. With the exception of Fang Blennies, Blennies are totally reef safe- in fact a reef environment is really best for them because they can be shy and the intricate rockwork of a reef provides ample hiding spaces. They are omnivores and should be fed a varied diet of frozen or live foods and plant matter. Blennies do not have teeth or functional jaw, so food must be small enough for them to swallow whole.
Blennies are often confused with Gobies, but there is an easy way to tell the difference. Gobies have two distinct dorsal fins, Blennies have a single dorsal fin that runs the length of their body. Also, Gobies' pelvic fins are fused to form a sucker, similar to Remoras.

The engineer goby is a close relative of cichlids and leaf fishes, the juvenile can often be found in aquarium trade, while the adult is rare.

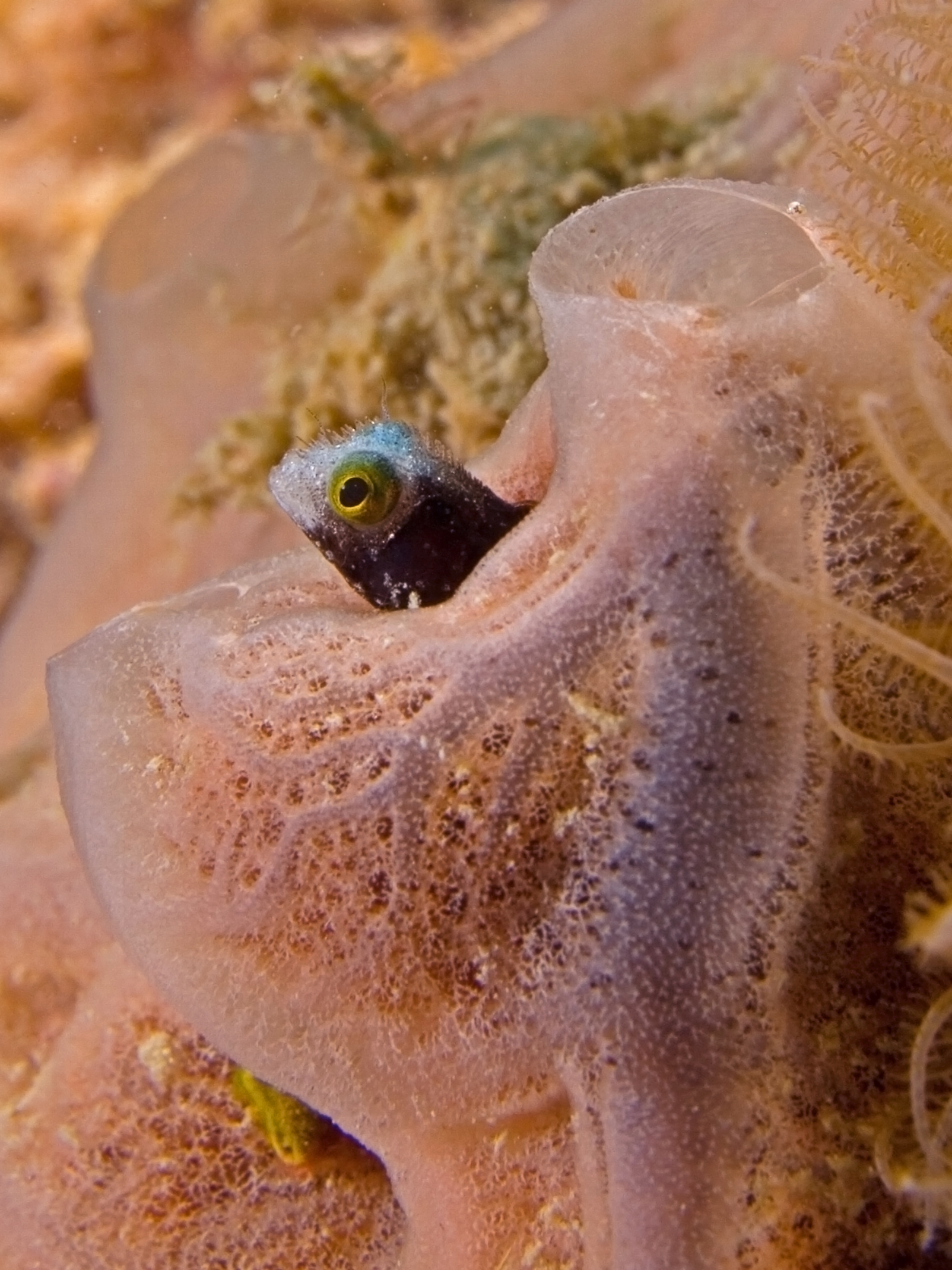
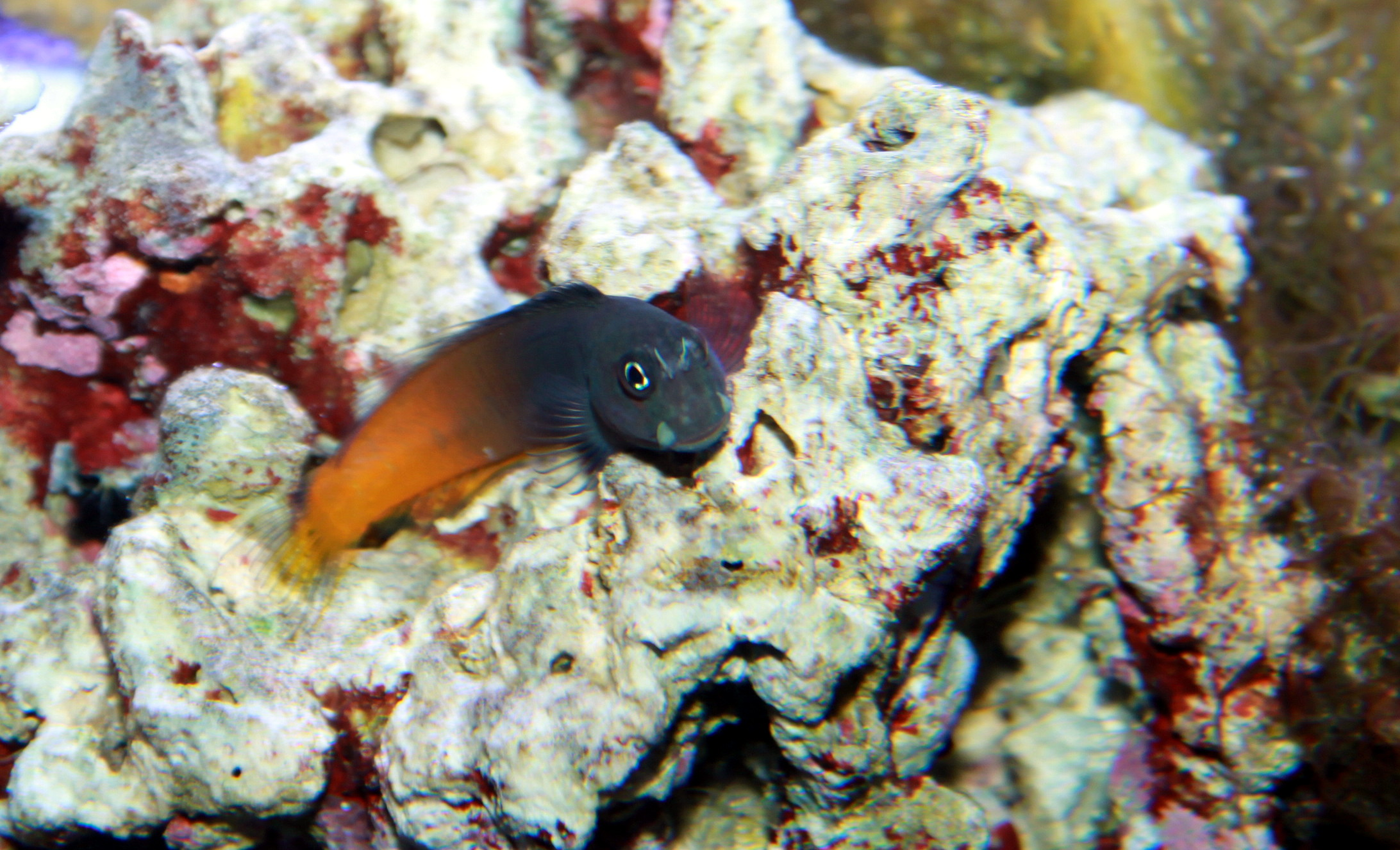
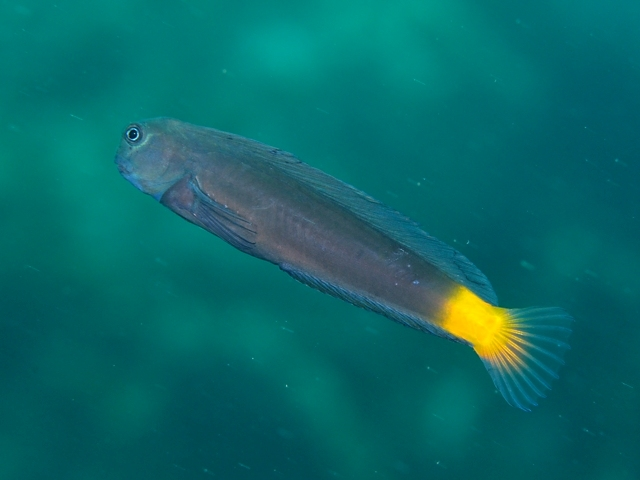
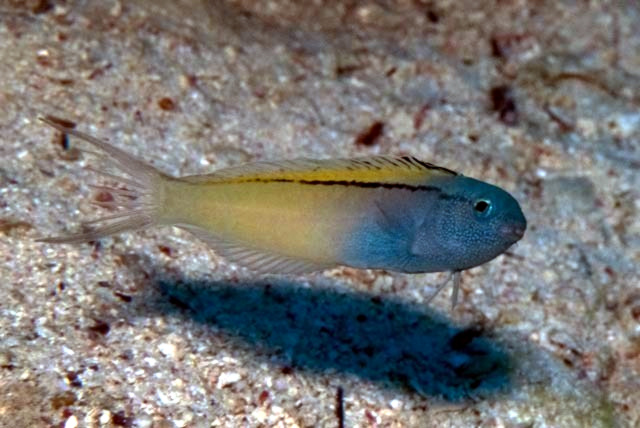
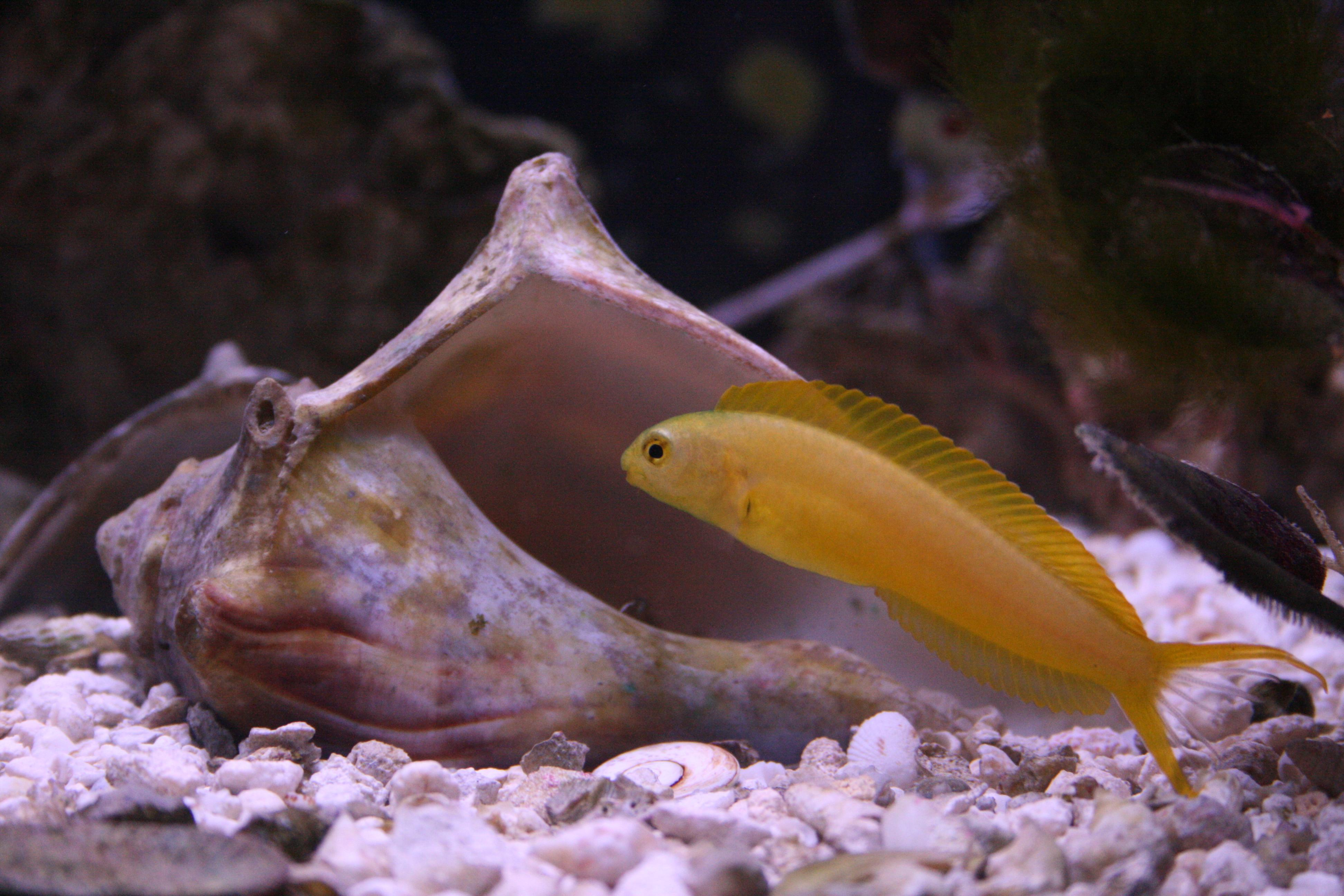
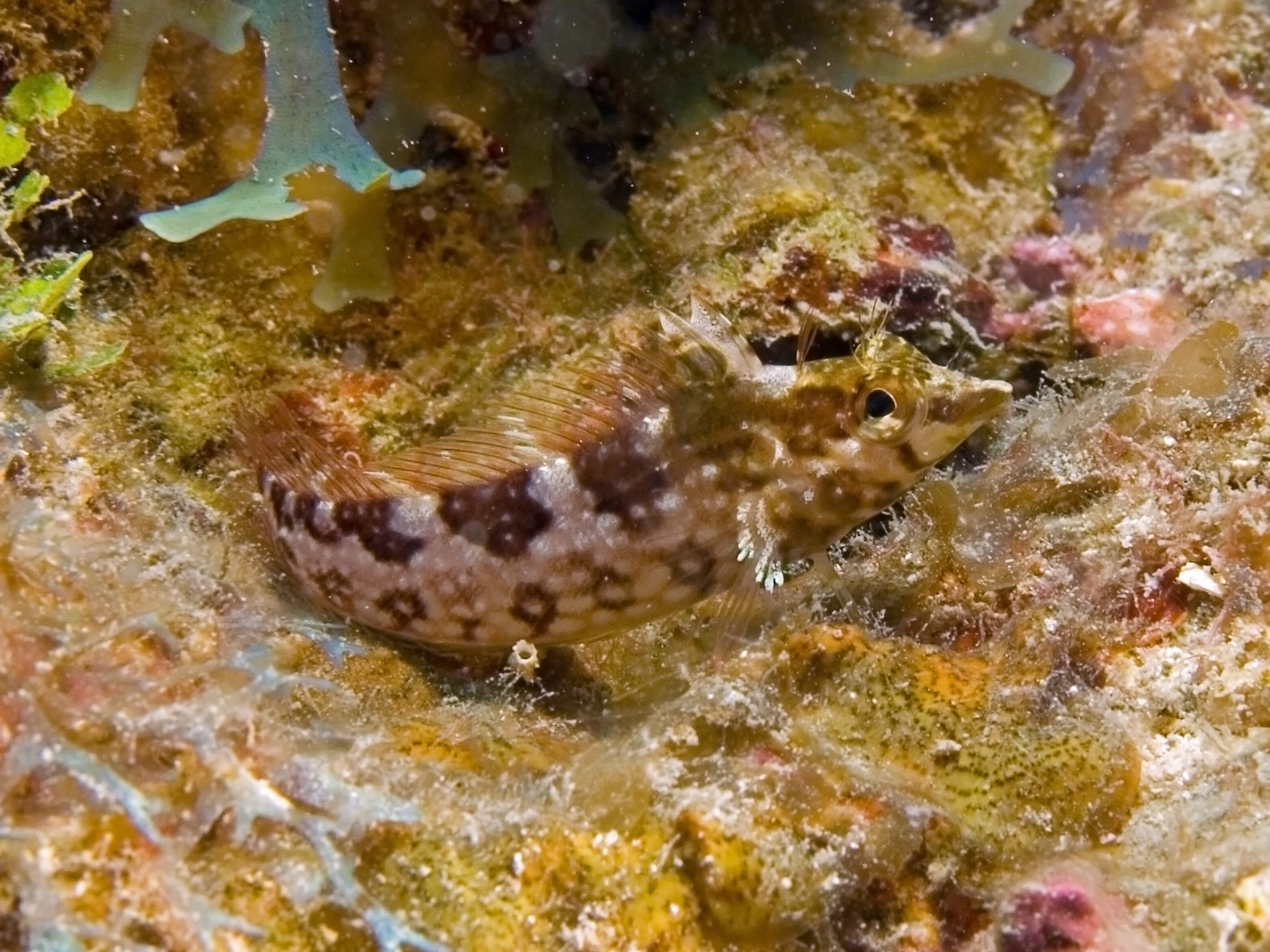
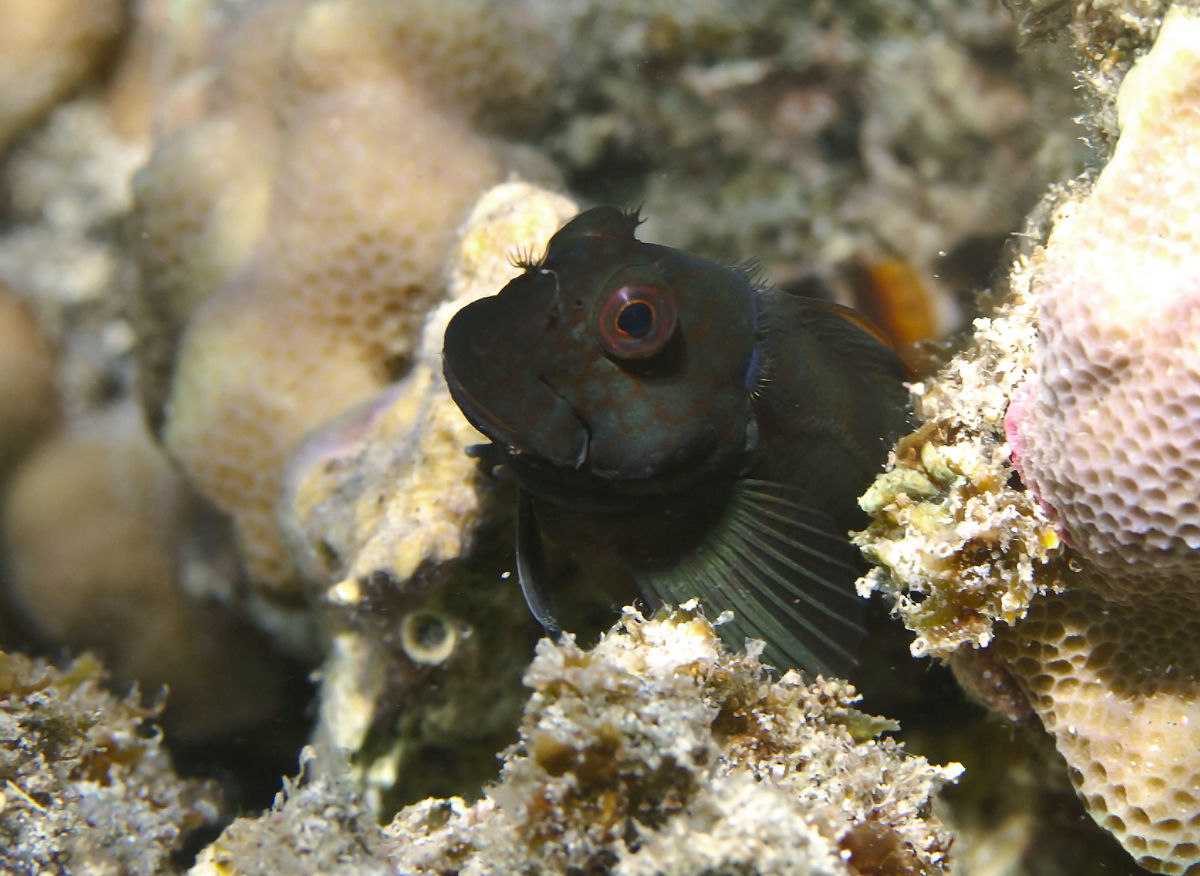
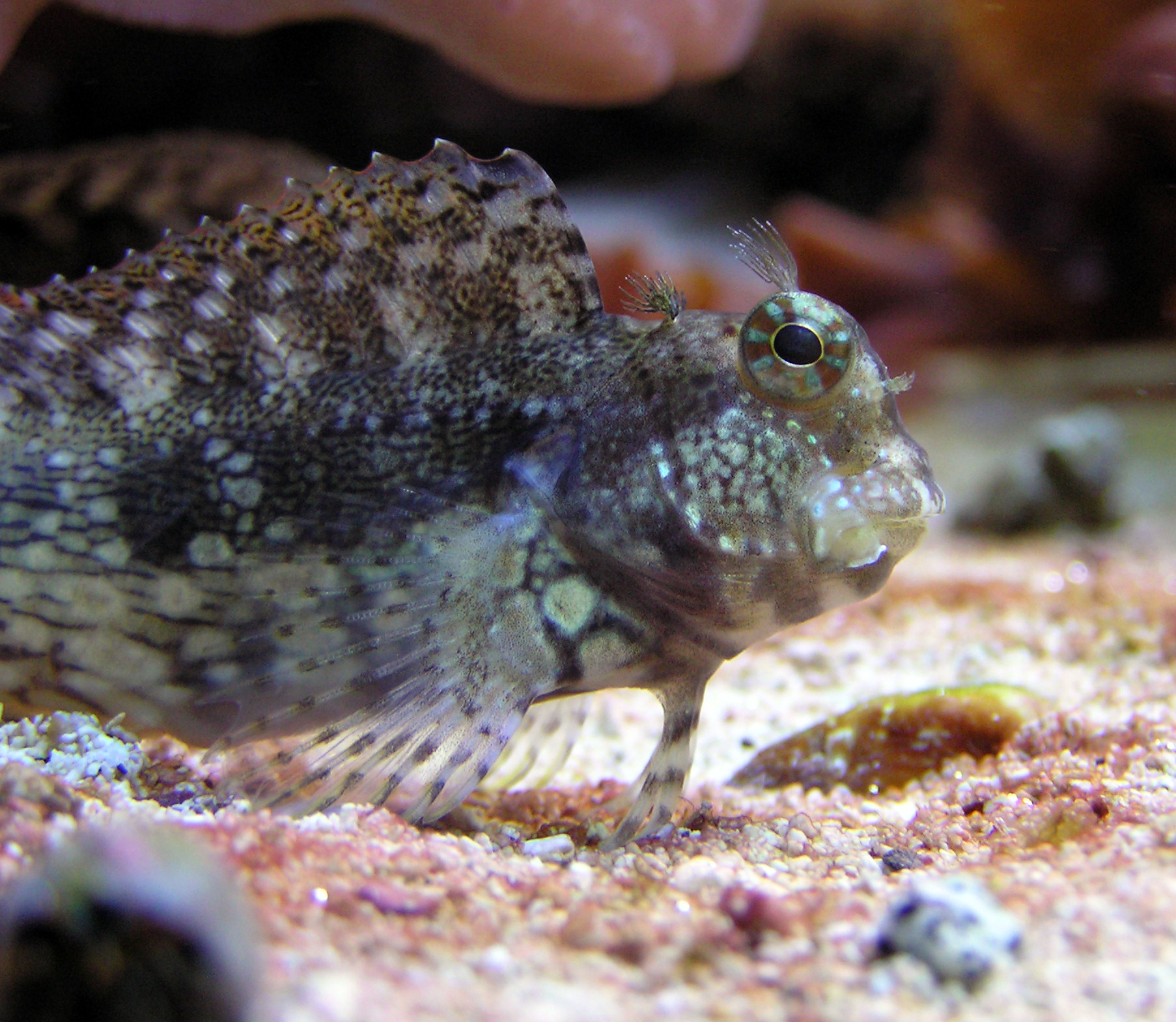
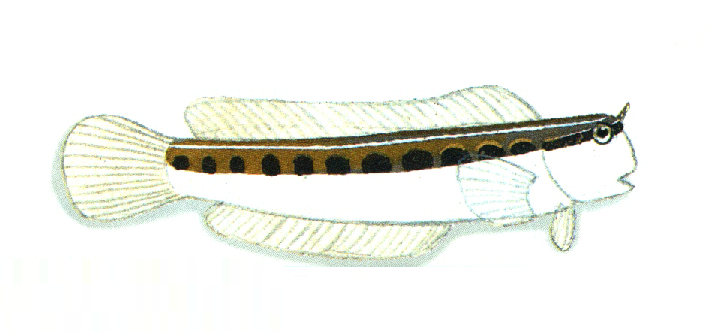
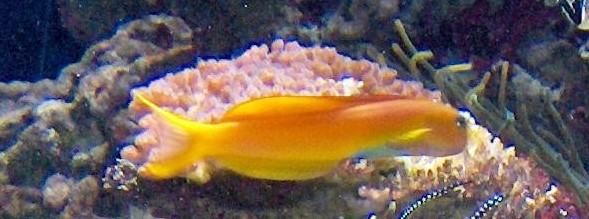
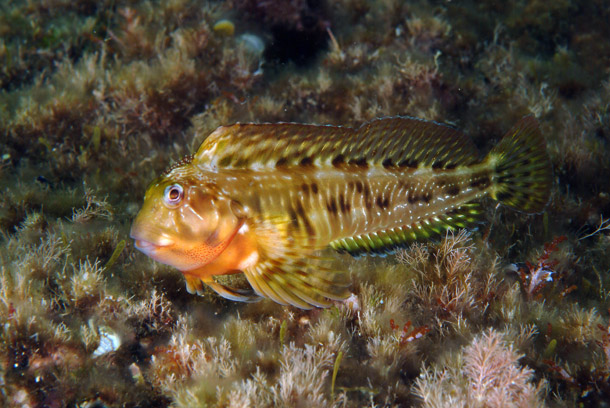
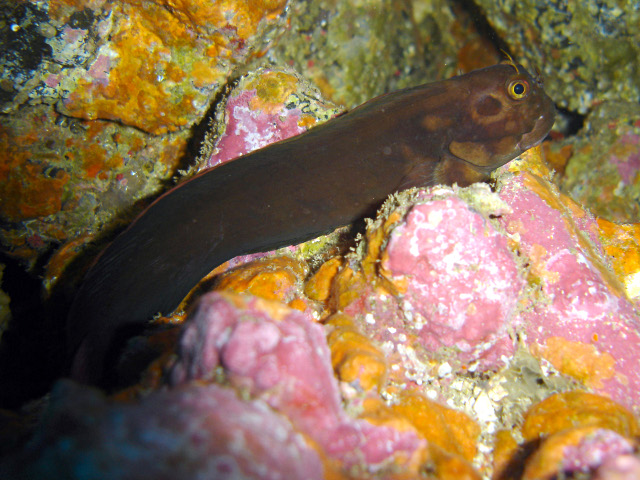
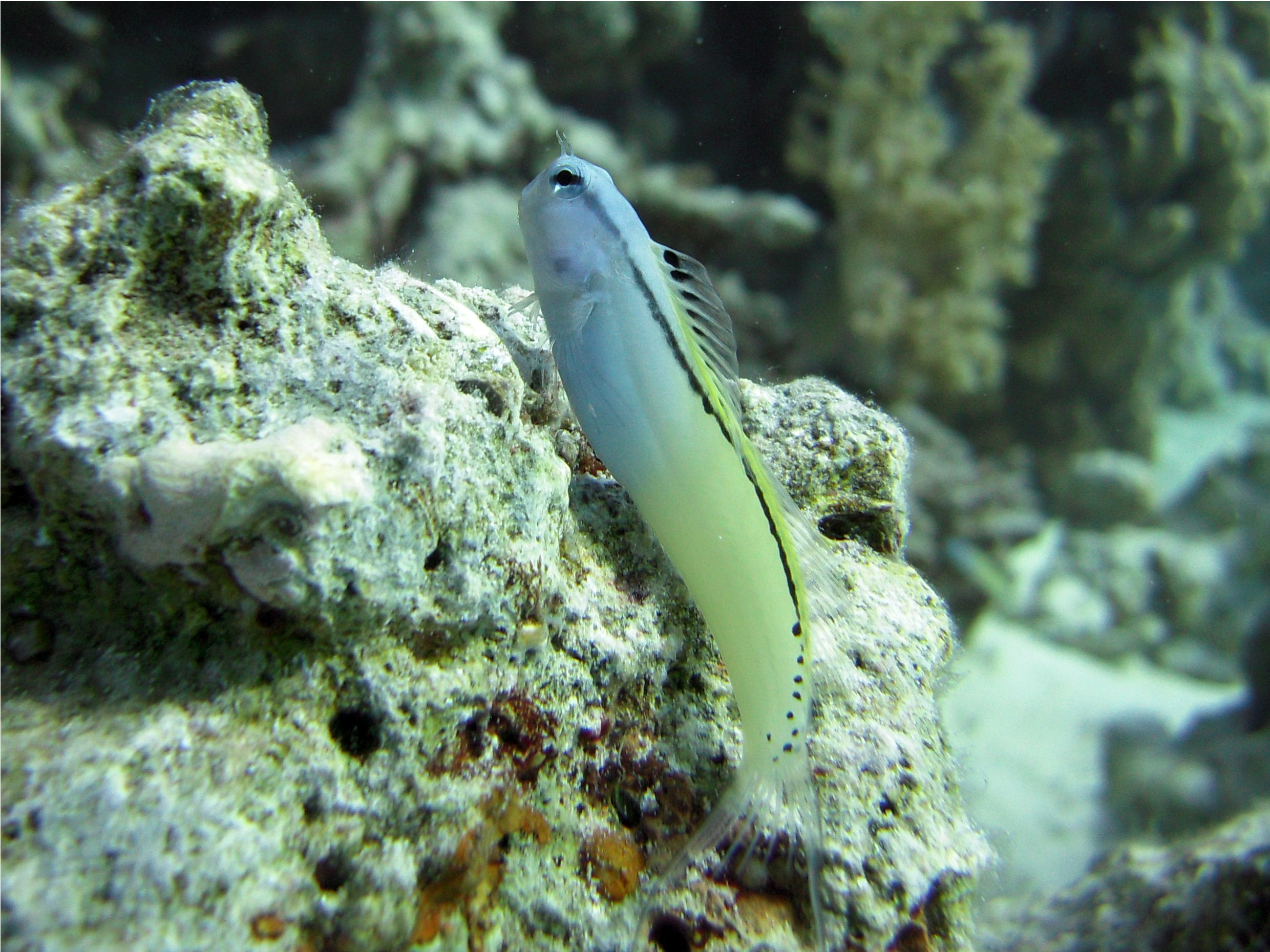
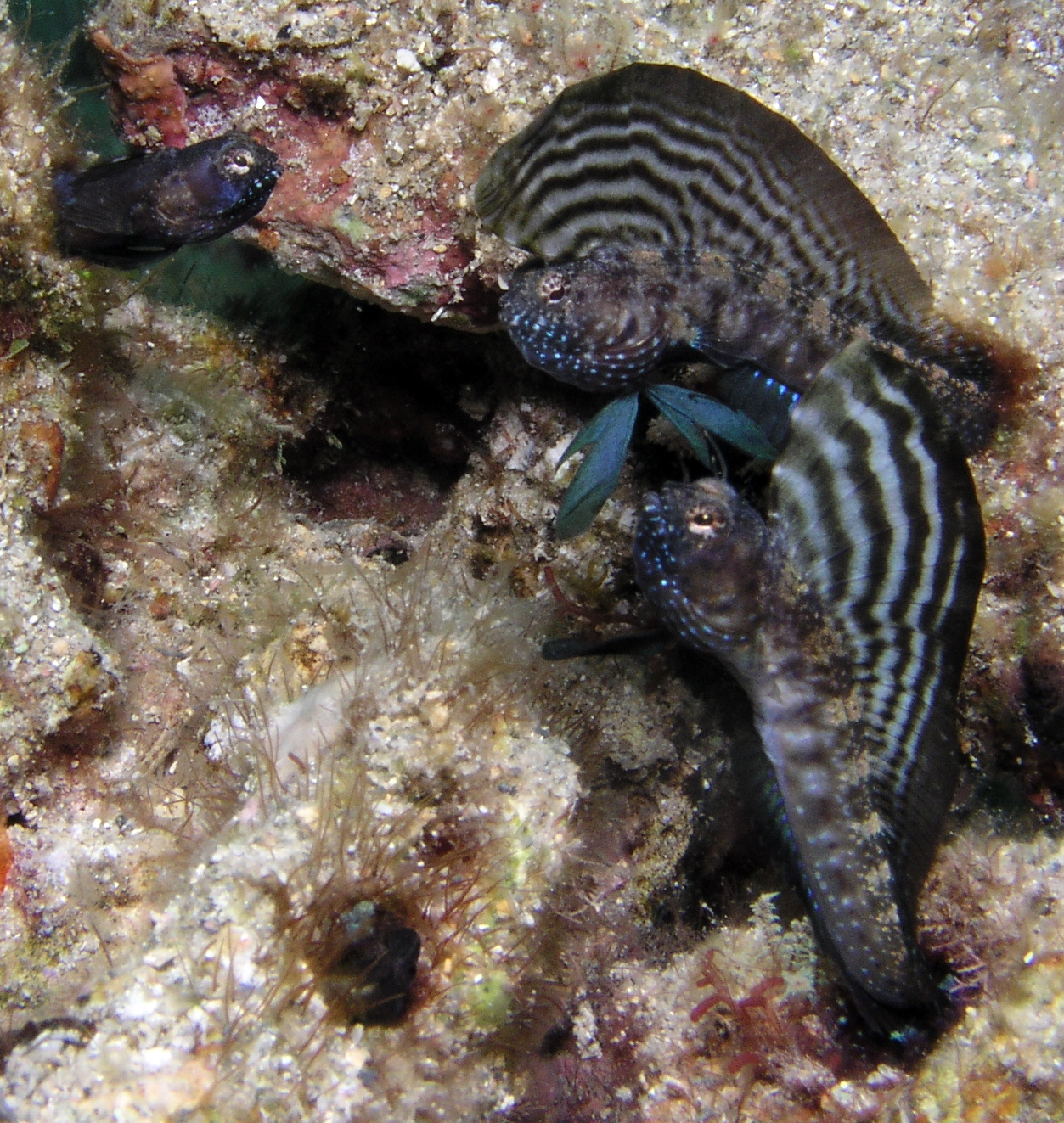
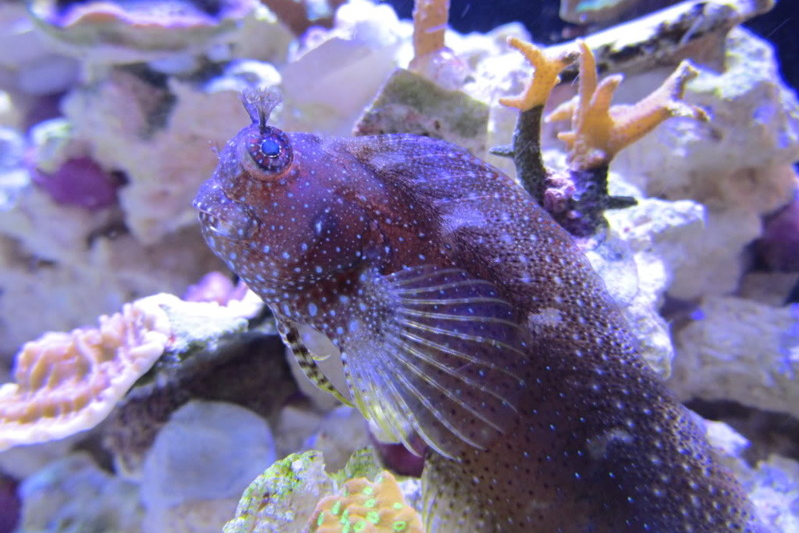
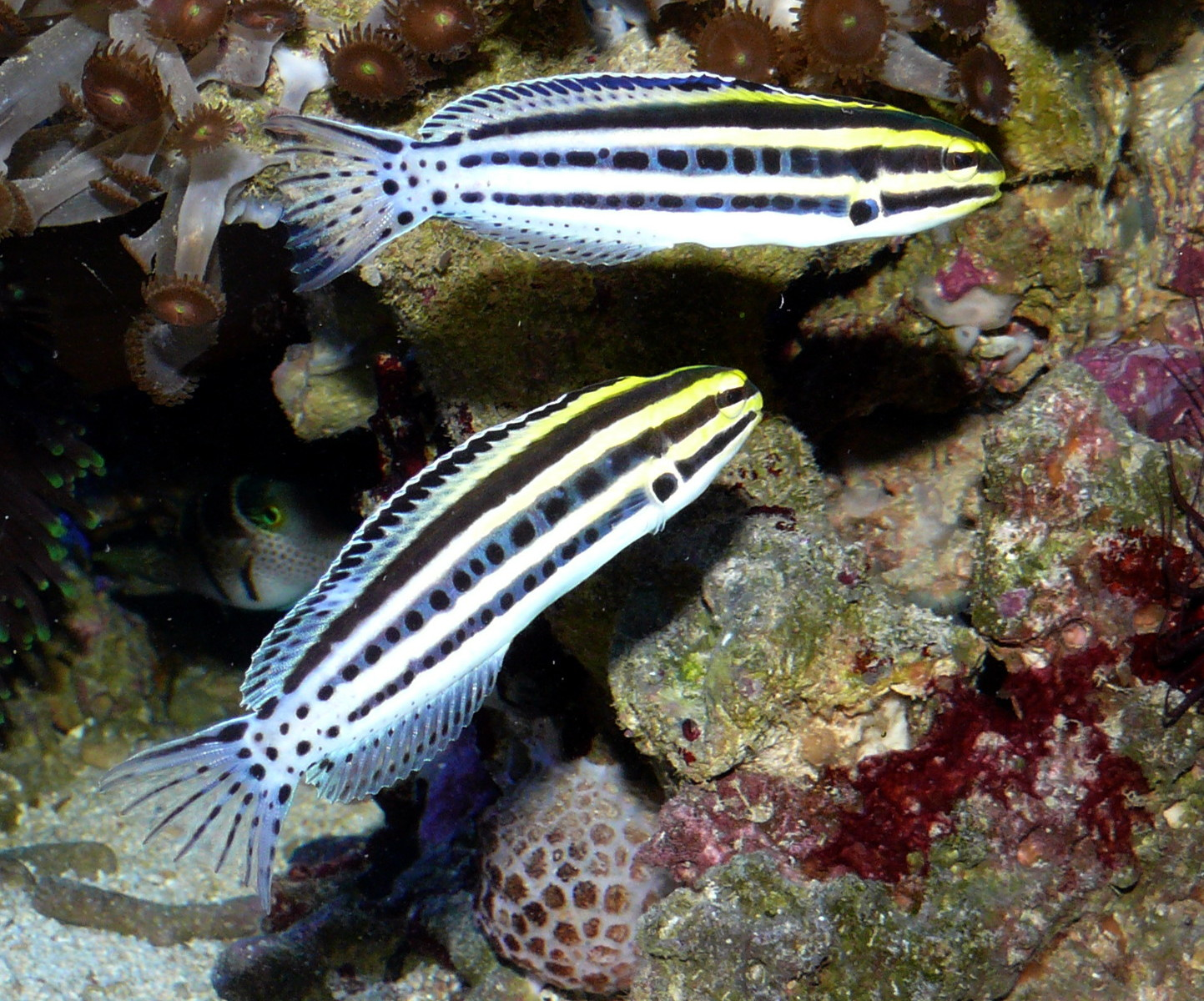
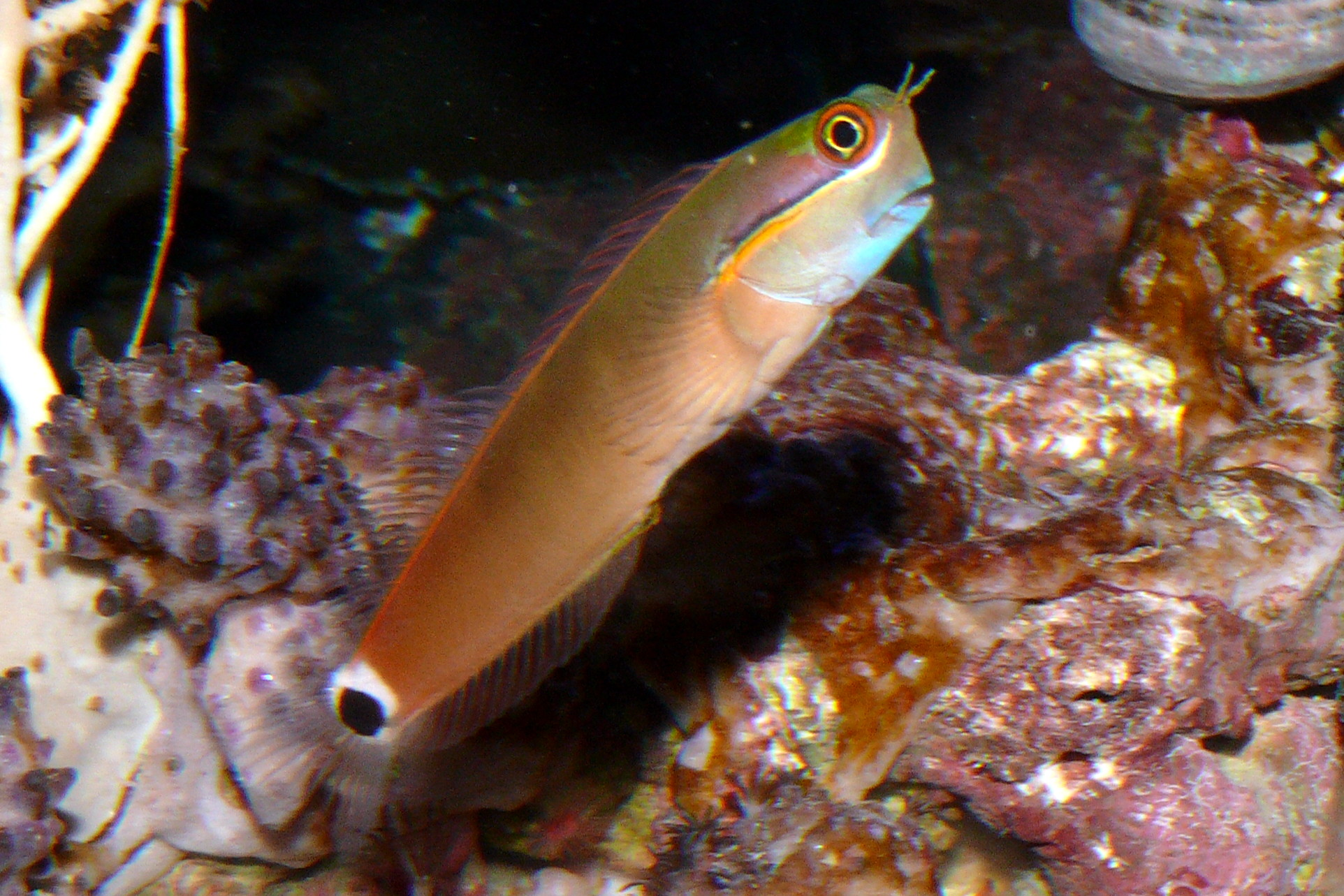
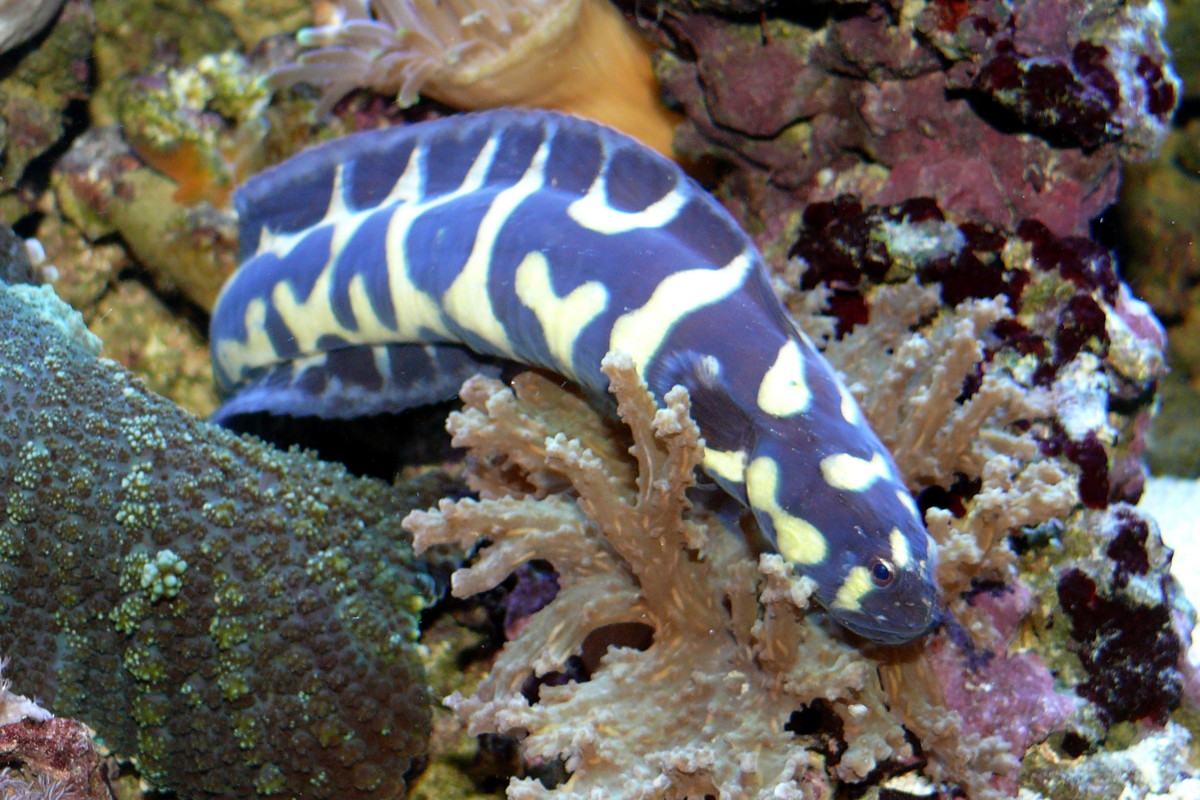
Common name	Image	Taxonomy	Reef safe	Description	Max size
Spinyhead blenny		Acanthemblemaria spinosa	Yes	Brown checkered body with distinctive yellow frills on head.	2 cm (0.8 in)
Bicolor blenny		Ecsenius bicolor	Yes	Characterized by the striking contrast of a blue head and upper torso followed by a yellow orange lower torso.	11 cm (4.3 in)
Black combtooth blenny		Ecsenius namiyei	Yes		10 cm (3.9 in)
Blackline fang blenny		Meiacanthus nigrolineatus	No	Yellow bodied with bright blue mask and dark black line running from the eye to the caudal fin.	9 cm (3.5 in)
Black sailfin blenny		Atrosalarias fuscus	Yes		10 cm (3.9 in)
Blue & gold blenny		Enchelyurus flavipes	Yes		5 cm (2.0 in)
Bundoon blenny		Meiacanthus bundoon	No	Black with lighter patch over caudal fin. Very distinctive swallowtail caudal fin.	8 cm (3.1 in)
Canary fang blenny		Meiacanthus oualanensis	Yes	Similarly shaped to M. bundoon, but canary yellow.	5 cm (2.0 in)
Diamond blenny		Malacoctenus boehlkei	Yes	Gray with black splotches, and a yellow mask. Shaped more like hawkfish than a blenny.	6.5 cm (2.6 in)
Ember blenny		Cirripectes stigmaticus	No		12 cm (4.7 in)
Harptail blenny		Meiacanthus mossambicus	Yes	Pale pinkish-grey body with jet-black dorsal and anal fins. Eyes are primarily white, sometimes seen with brown segmentation.	10cm (3.9in)
Lawnmower blenny		Salarias fasciatus	Yes	Tan and brown striped and spotted with iridescence. Requires Mature Tank.	14 cm (5.5 in)
Linear blenny		Ecsenius lineatus	Yes		9 cm (3.5 in)
Midas blenny		Ecsenius midas	Yes	Although often seen yellow, this fish has the ability to change its color to match the surroundings. It has a very distinctive swallowtail shaped caudal fin.	13 cm (5.1 in)
Molly Miller blenny		Scartella cristata	Yes	Mottled tan, white, and black covering the body and fins.	12 cm (4.7 in)
One spot blenny		Crossosalarias macrospilus	No		10 cm (3.9 in)
Red lip blenny		Ophioblennius atlanticus	Yes	Black to grayish yellow with red patch over mouth.	19 cm (7.5 in)
Red Sea mimic blenny		Ecsenius gravieri		Sky blue anterior fading to yellow towards the tail, with a black stripe running the eye to the base of the caudal fin.	8 cm (3.1 in)
Sailfin blenny		Emblemaria pandionis	Yes	Very similar to Salarias fasciatus but slightly darker and with a much larger dorsal fin.	5 cm (2.0 in)
Segmented sailfin blenny		Salarias segmentatus	Yes		10 cm (3.9 in)
Starry blenny		Salarias ramosus	Yes		14 cm (5.5 in)
Striped blenny		Meiacanthus grammistes	Yes		12 cm (4.7 in)
Tail spot blenny		Ecsenius stigmatura	Yes	Drab tan all over with dark spot at the base of the caudal fin and a light yellow line through eye.	6 cm (2.4 in)
Two-spot blenny		Ecsenius bimaculatus	Yes	The top half of this fish is black towards the front and fades to white closer to the tail. The bottom half is white with two distinctive black spots right under the pectoral fins.	4.5 cm (1.8 in)
Engineer goby		Pholidichthys leucotaenia	Yes	Not actually a blenny but from closely related family Pholidichthys. Juvenile has black eel-shaped body with a distinctive white stripe running down the body. Adults are yellow and black striped.	34 cm (13.4 in)

== Boxfish and blowfish ==
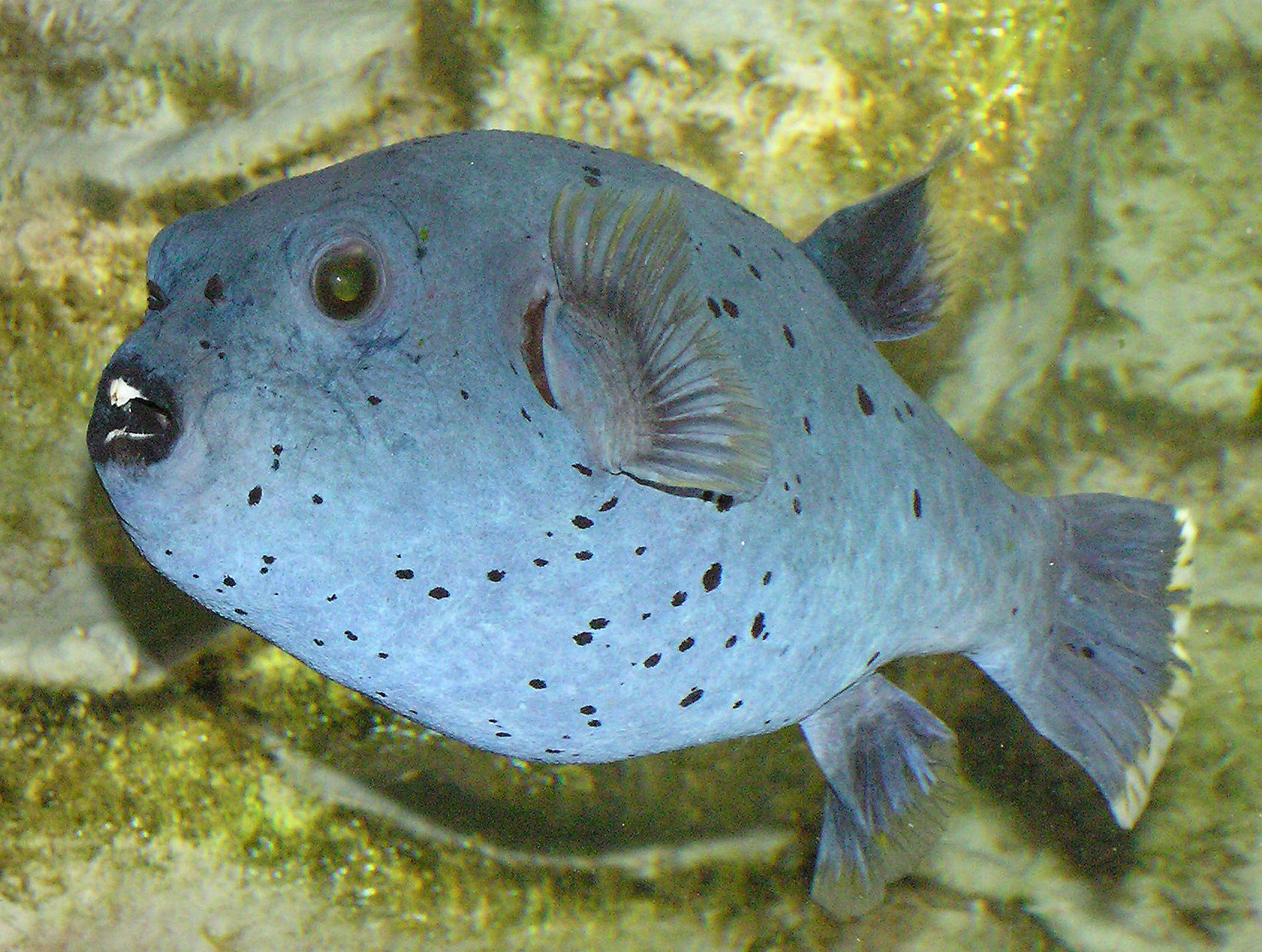
Dogface pufferfish

Members of the family Tetraodontidae, Boxfish, Blowfish or Pufferfish and their cousins Cowfishes and Porcupinefishes can be very personable and quirky pets, for the prepared.
They are not thought of as an ordinary aquarium tank mate, but are quickly gaining popularity. They do pose a hazard in the community tank however. They are capable of releasing a very powerful toxin which can kill other fish and in some cases, the boxfish itself. They generally only use it when threatened or dying, but can become disturbed easily with aggressive tank mates or overcrowded aquarium. Generally they are reef safe, though they will pick at invertebrates if not fed well enough.
Many people think puffed up Pufferfish, like in the picture, are cute, but an owner should never subject their pet to this as they are often unable to expel the air should they be out of the water. To prevent this, never remove a puffer from the water.

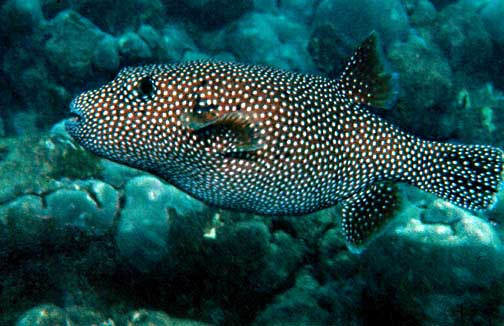
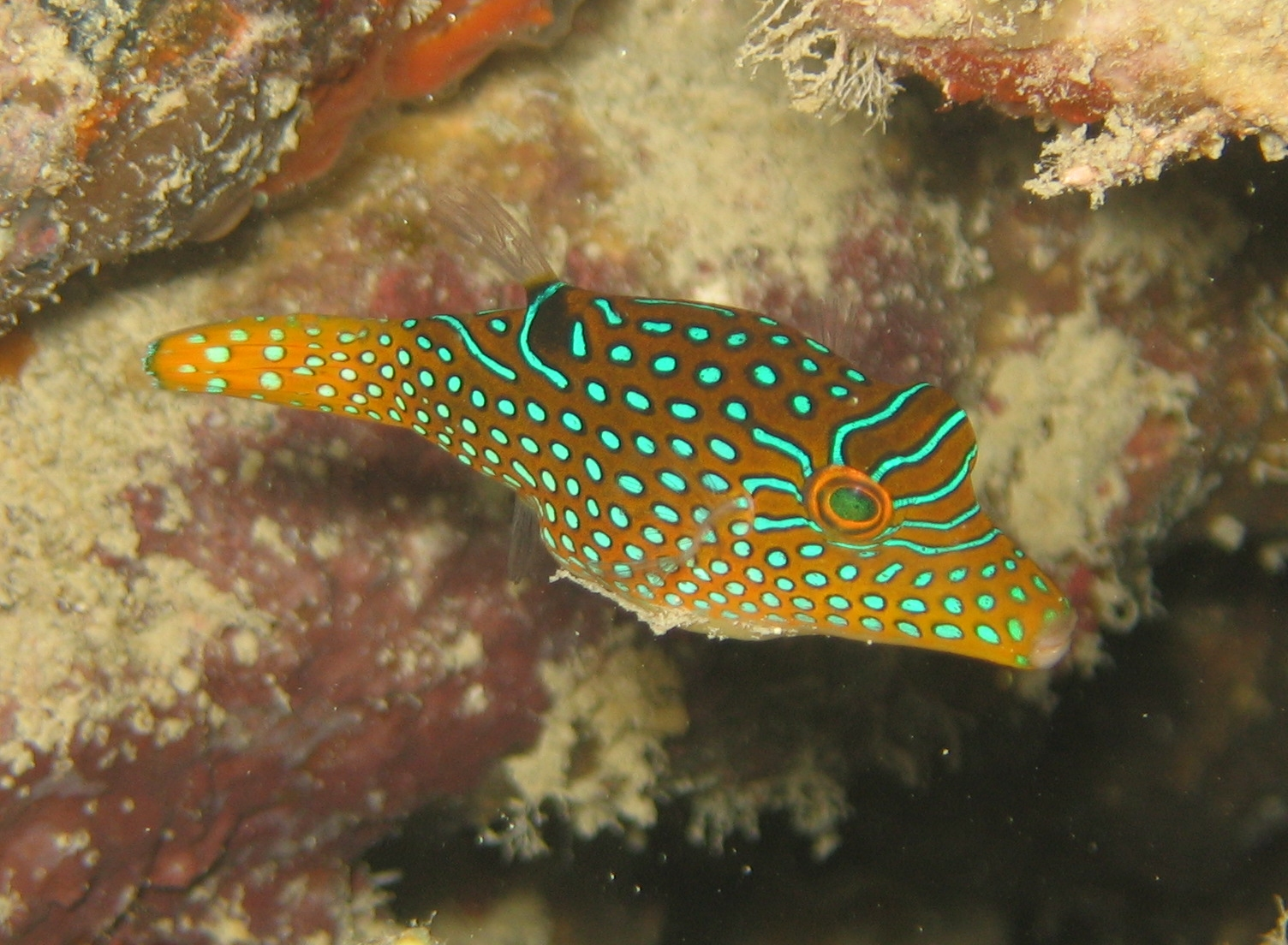
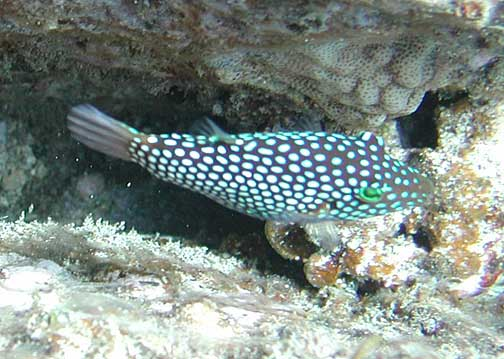
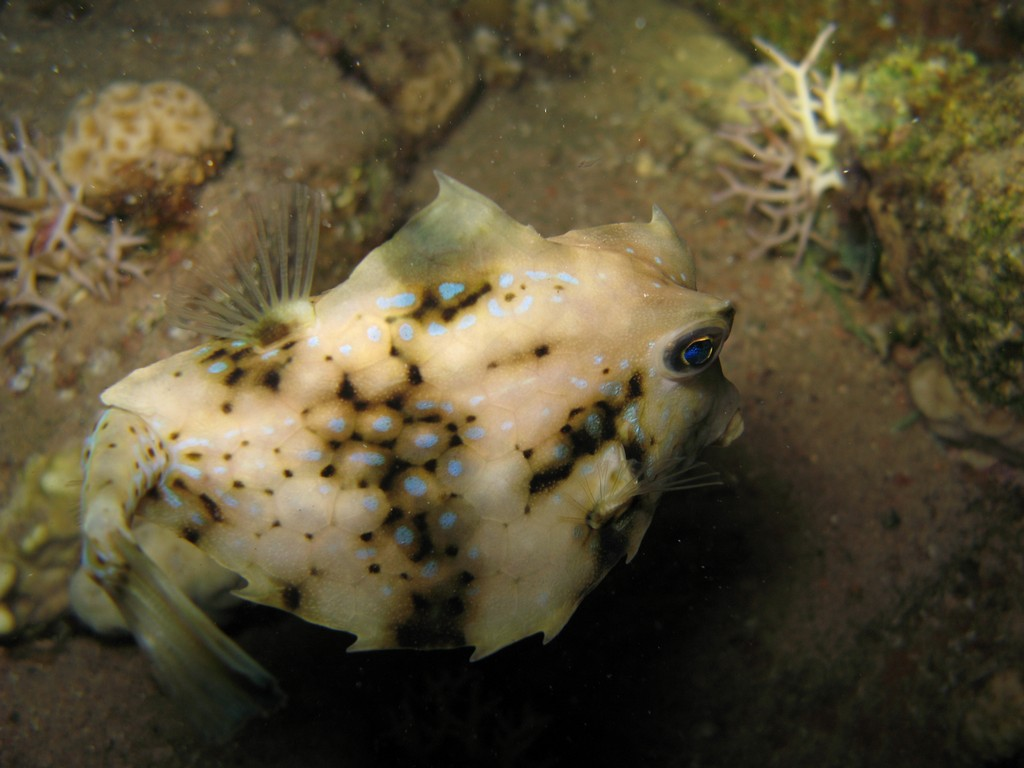
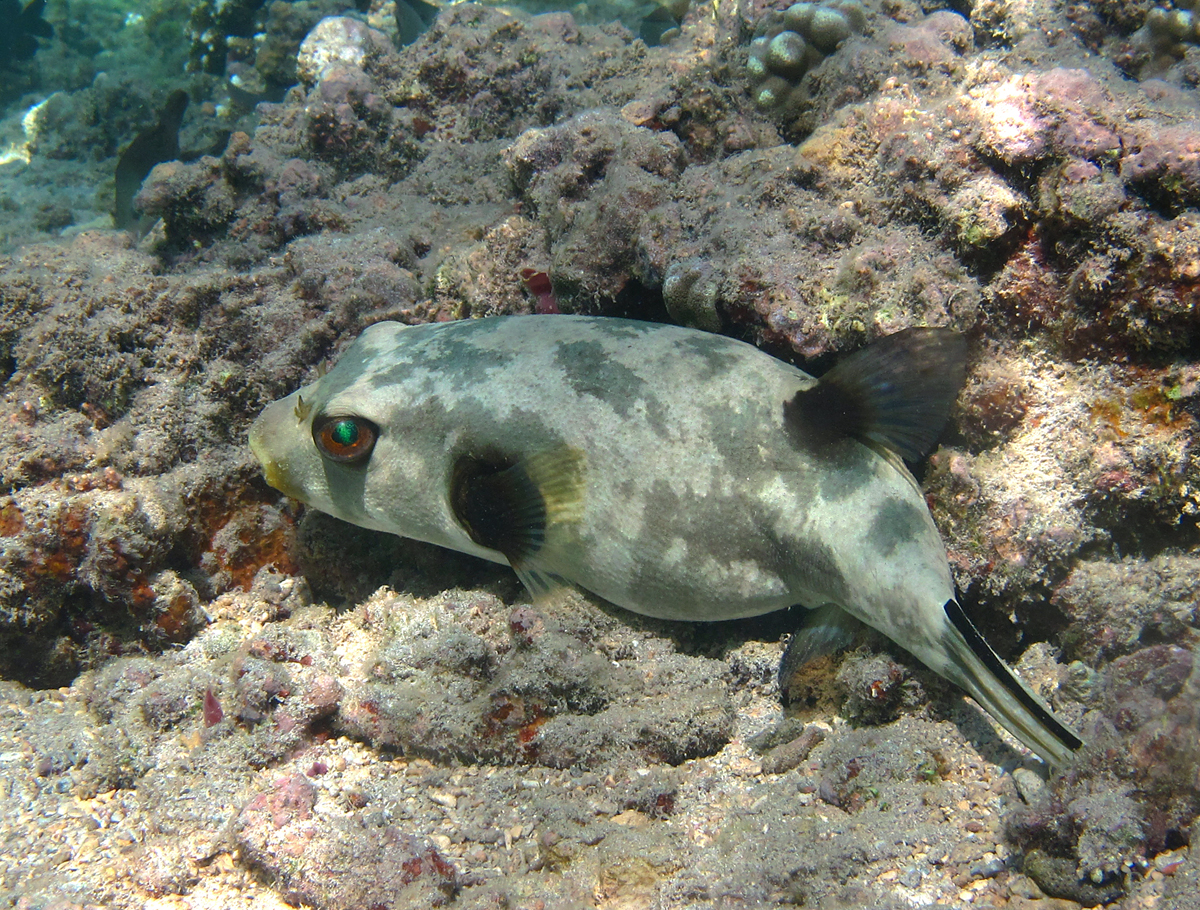
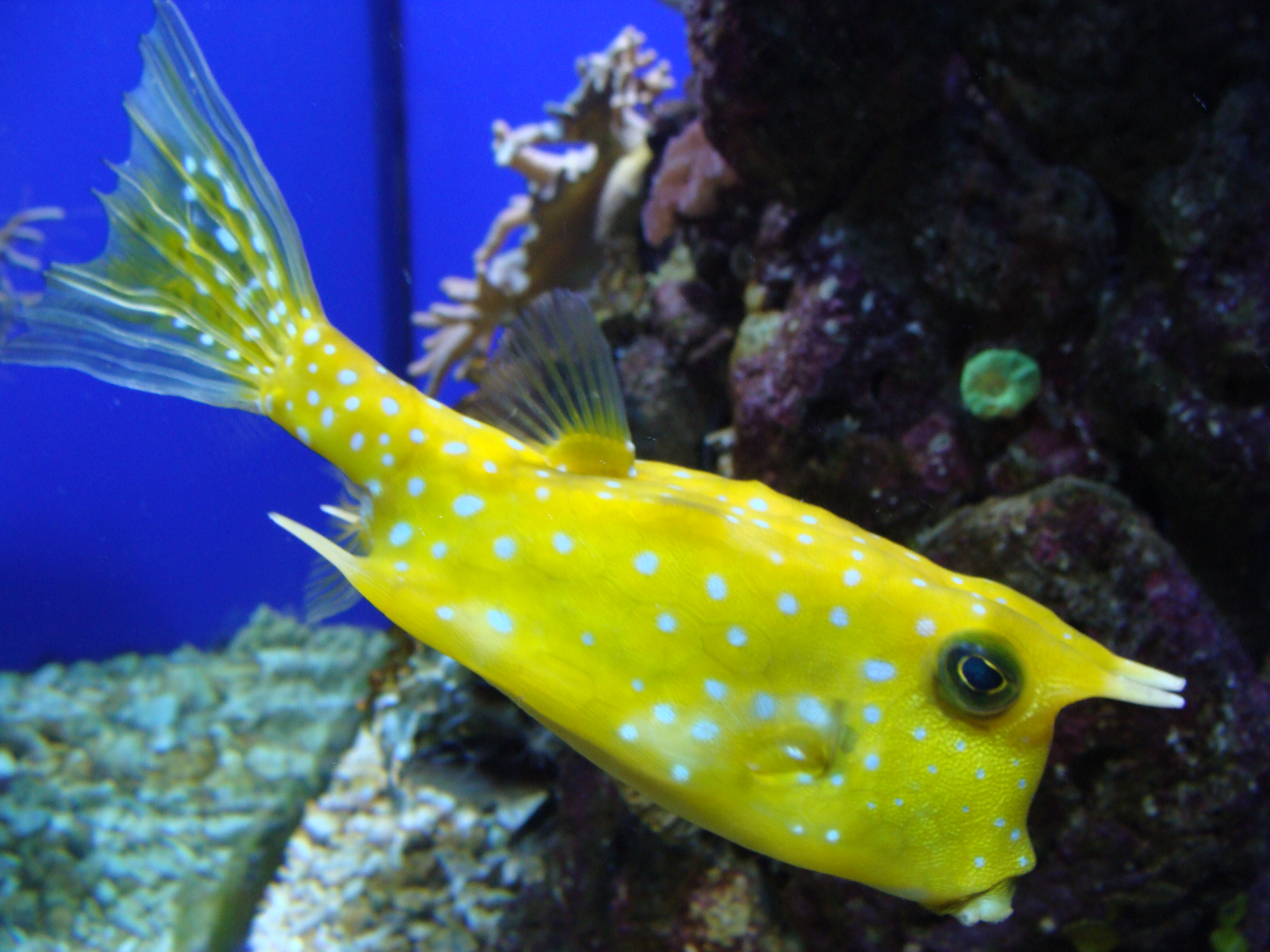
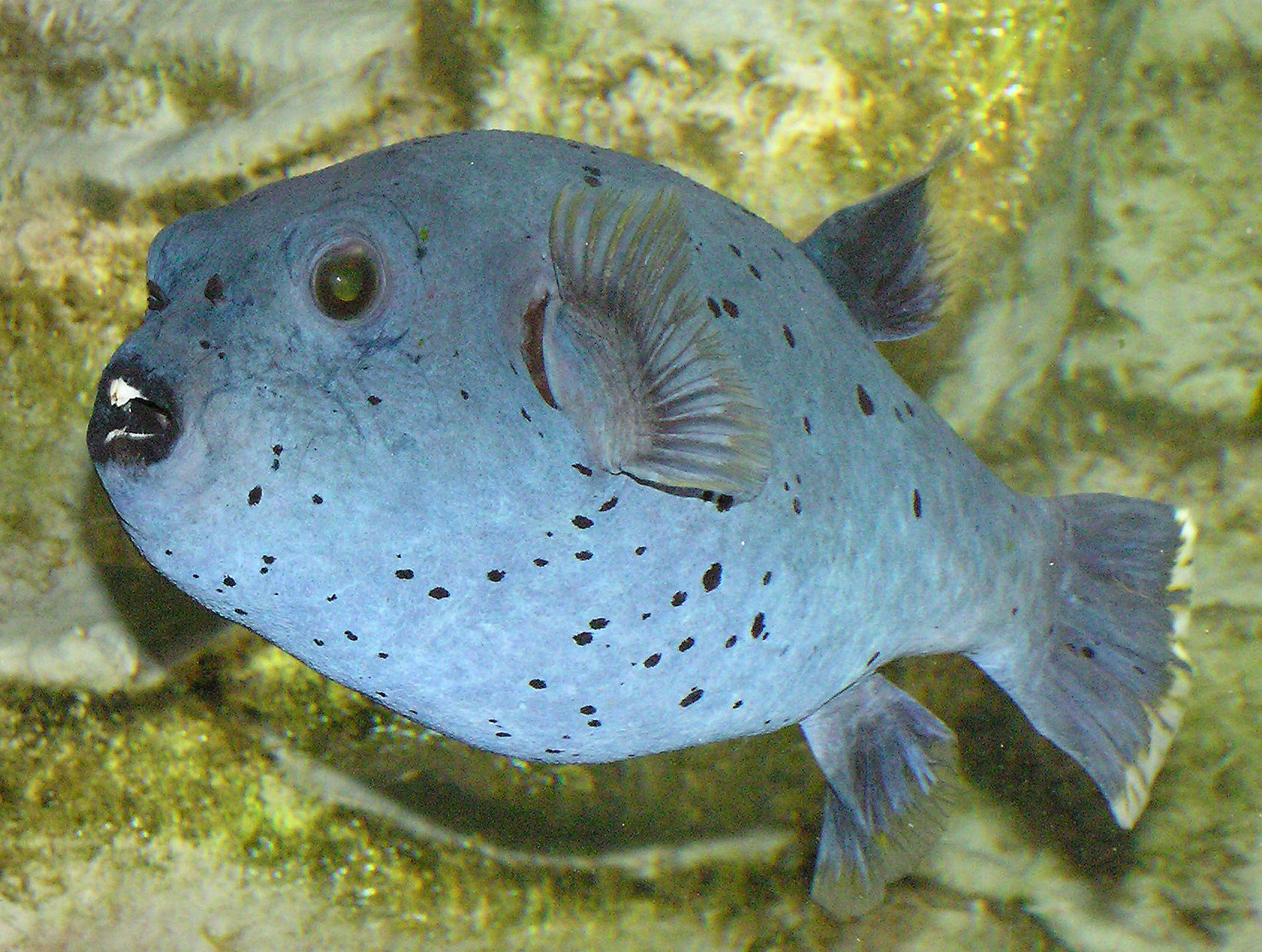
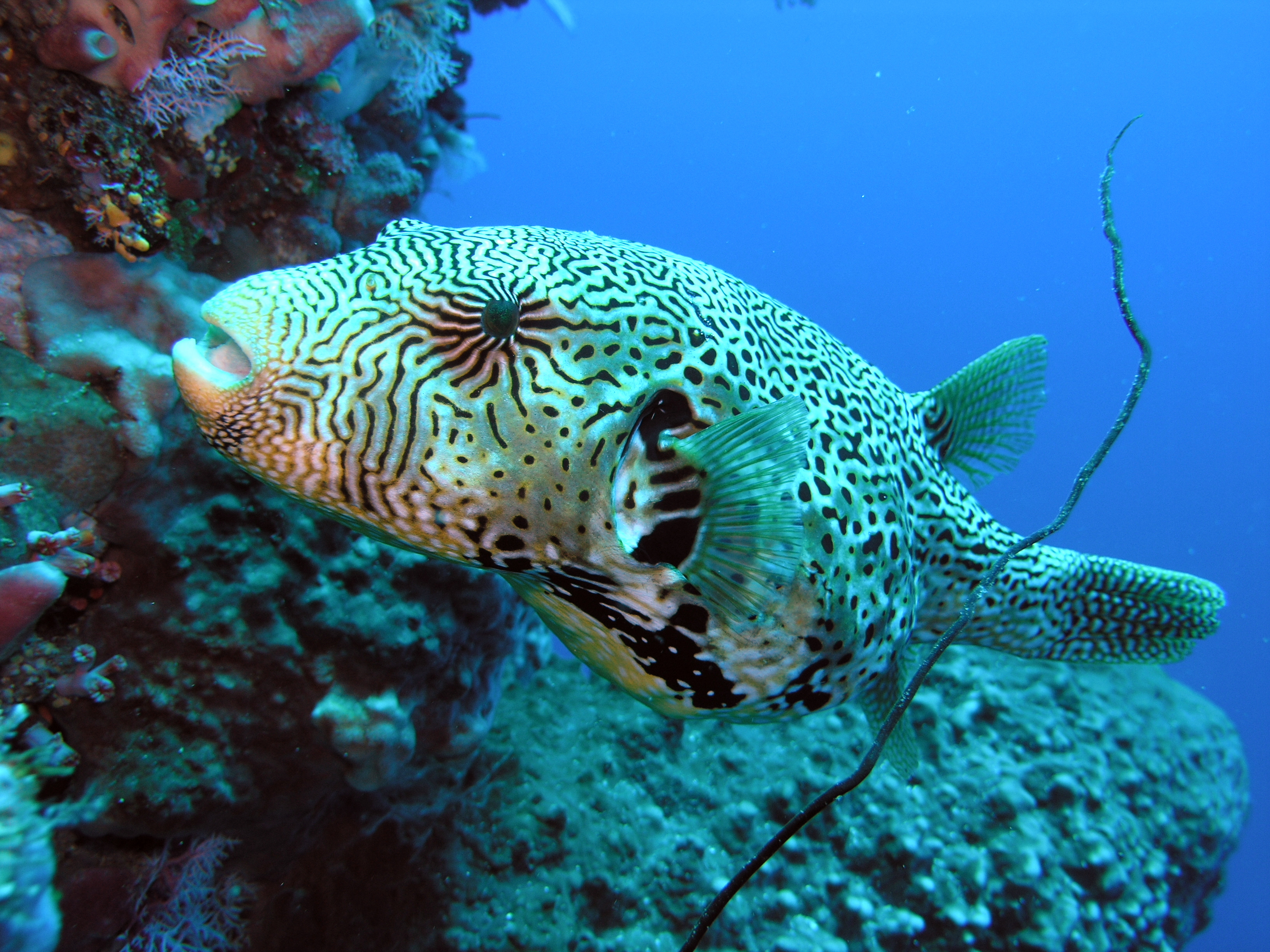
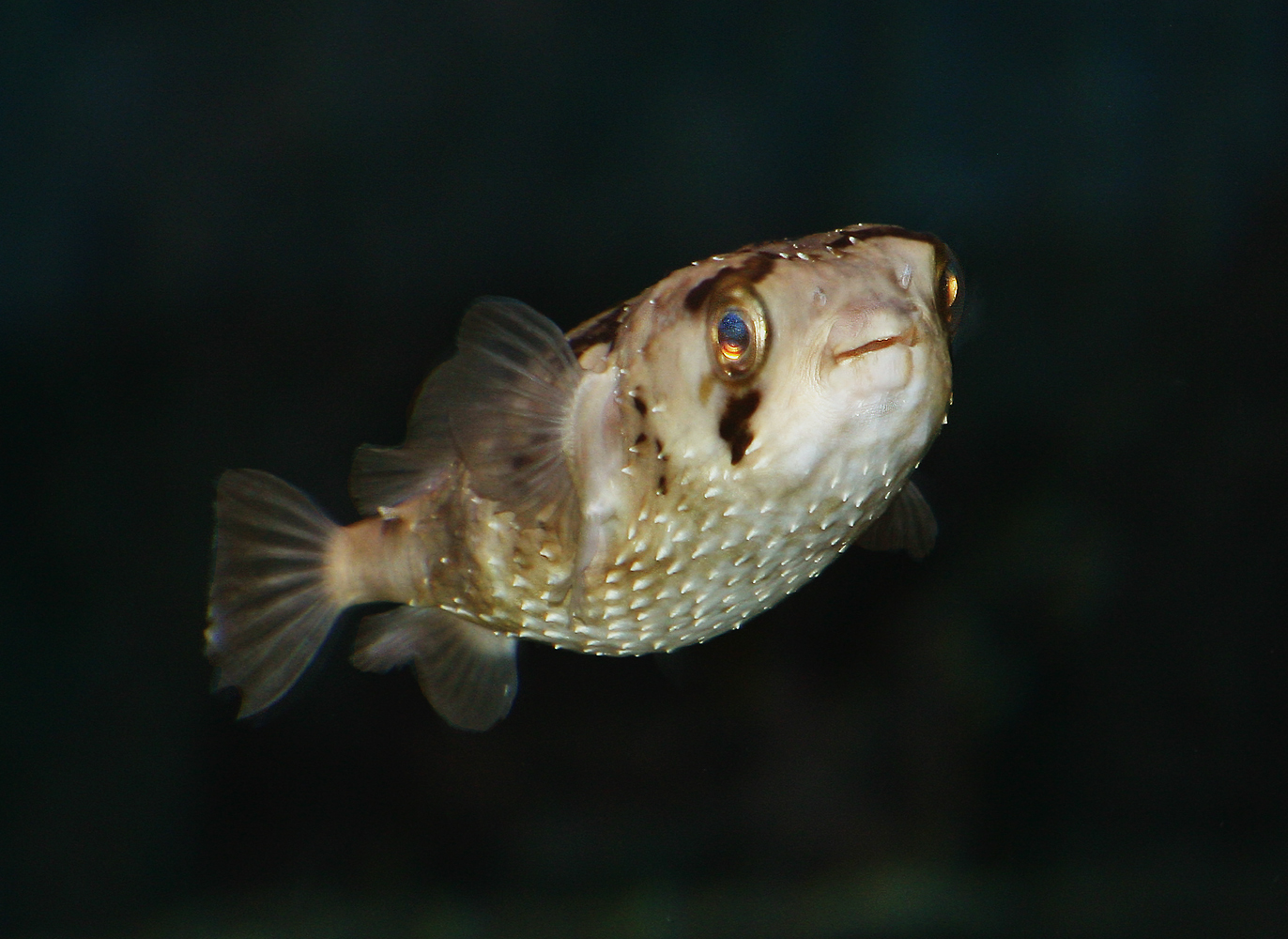
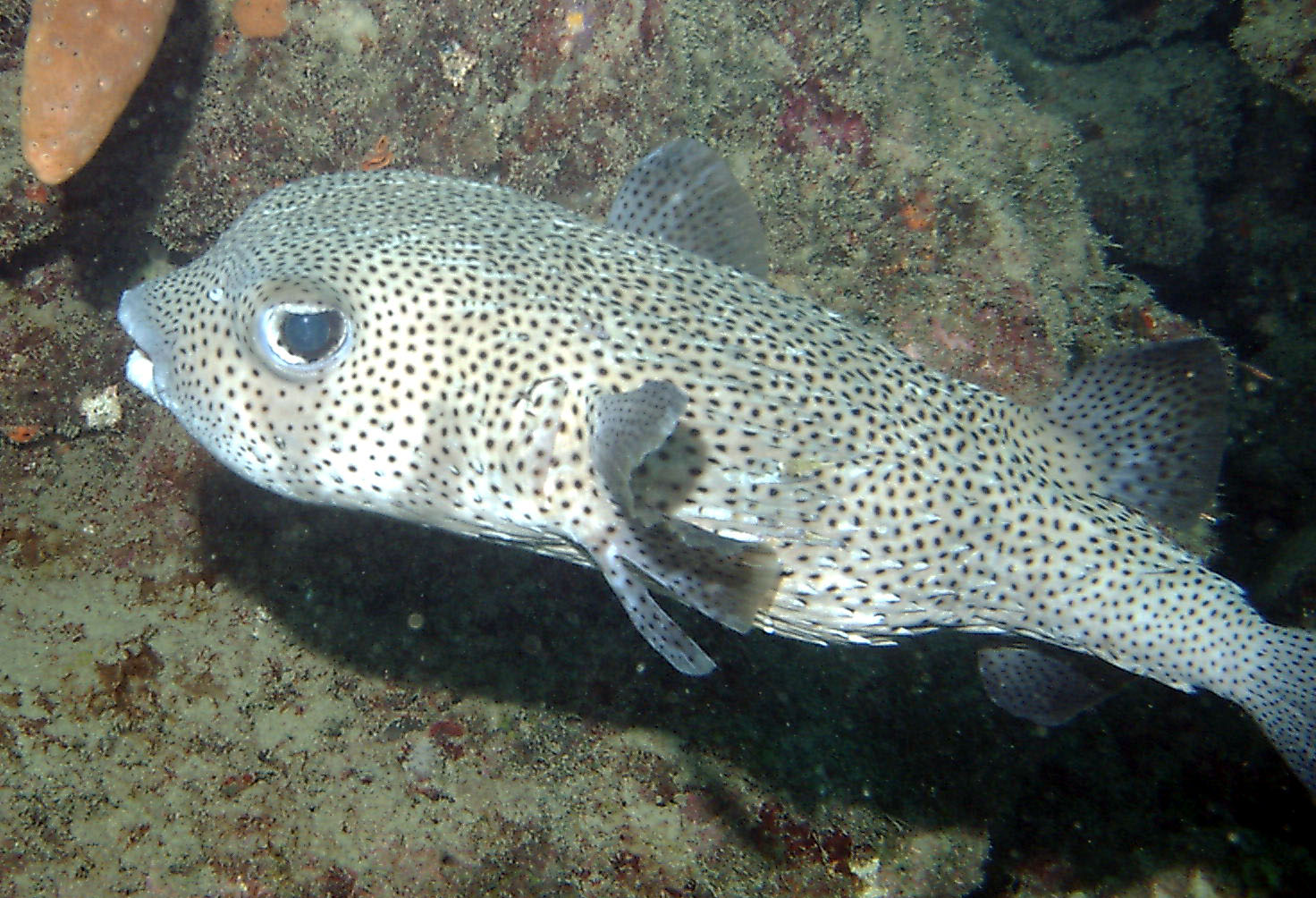
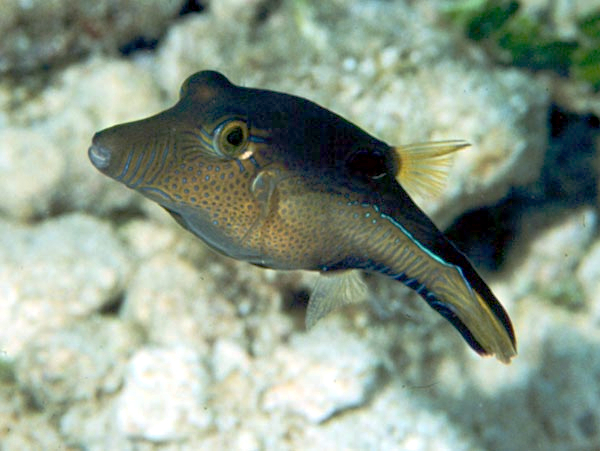
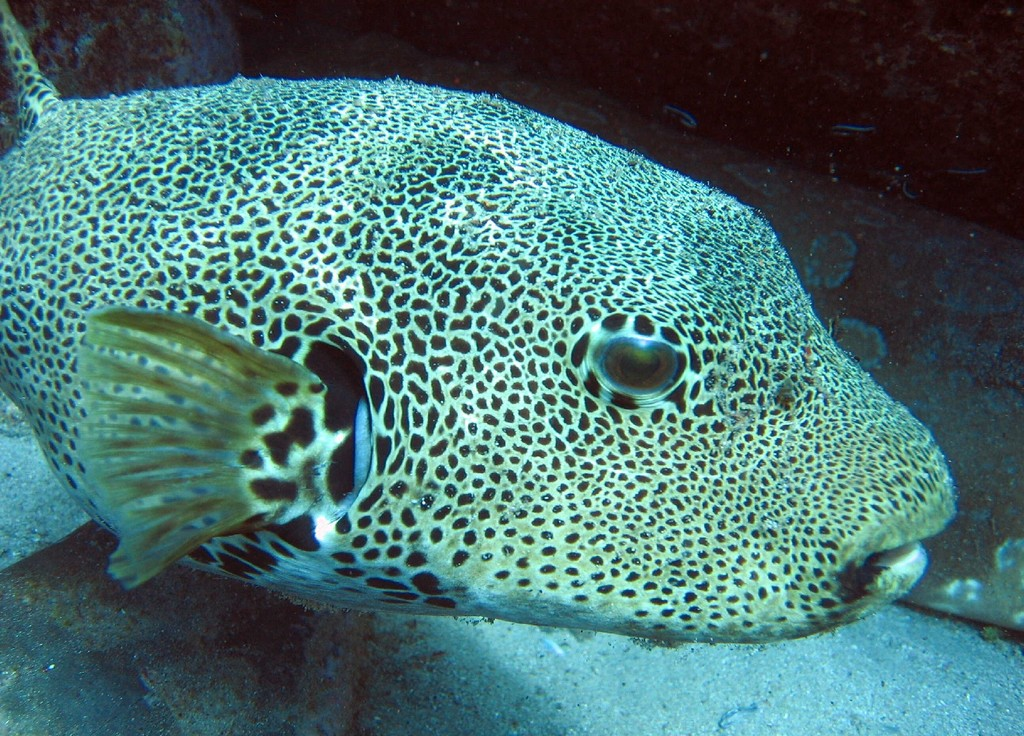
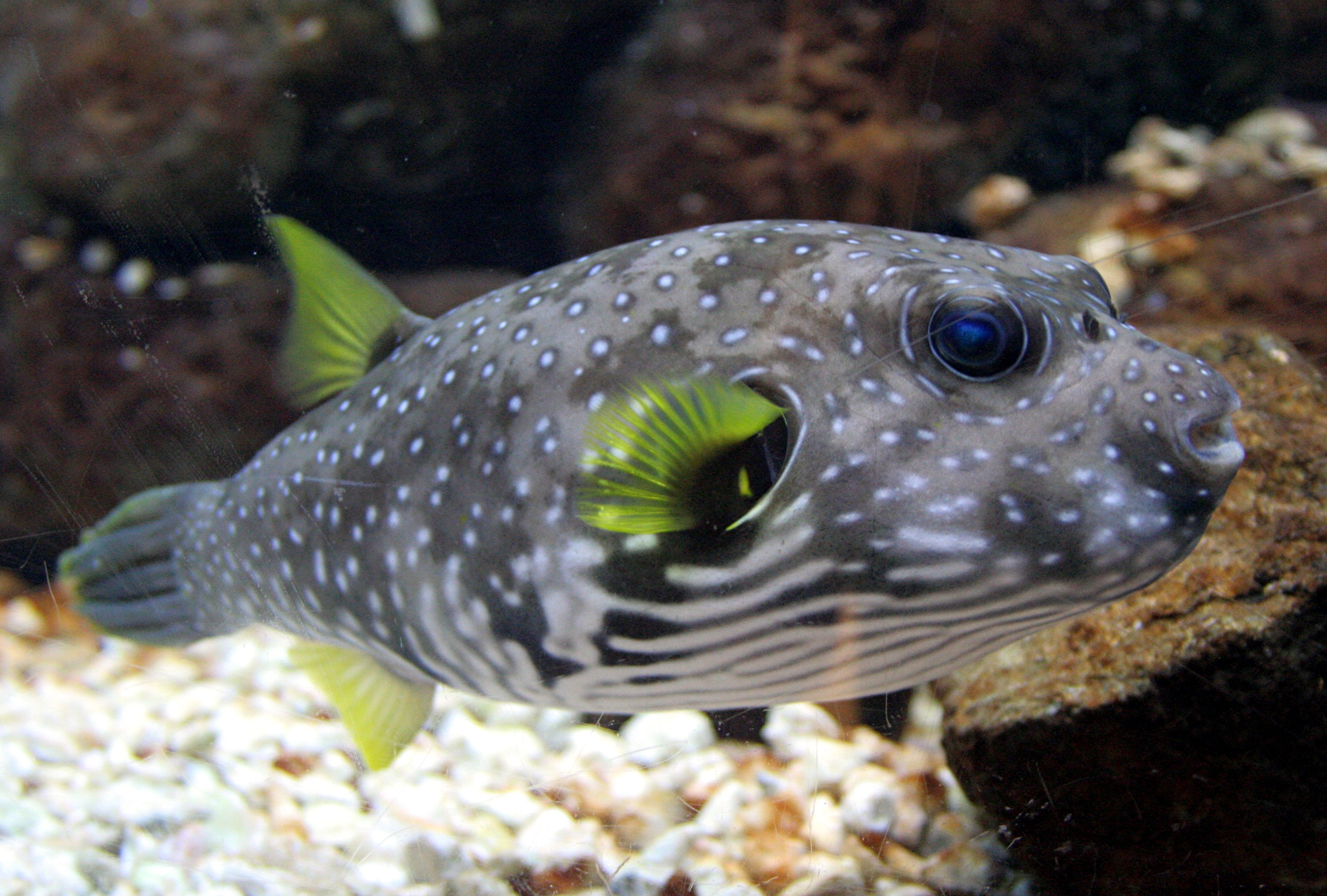
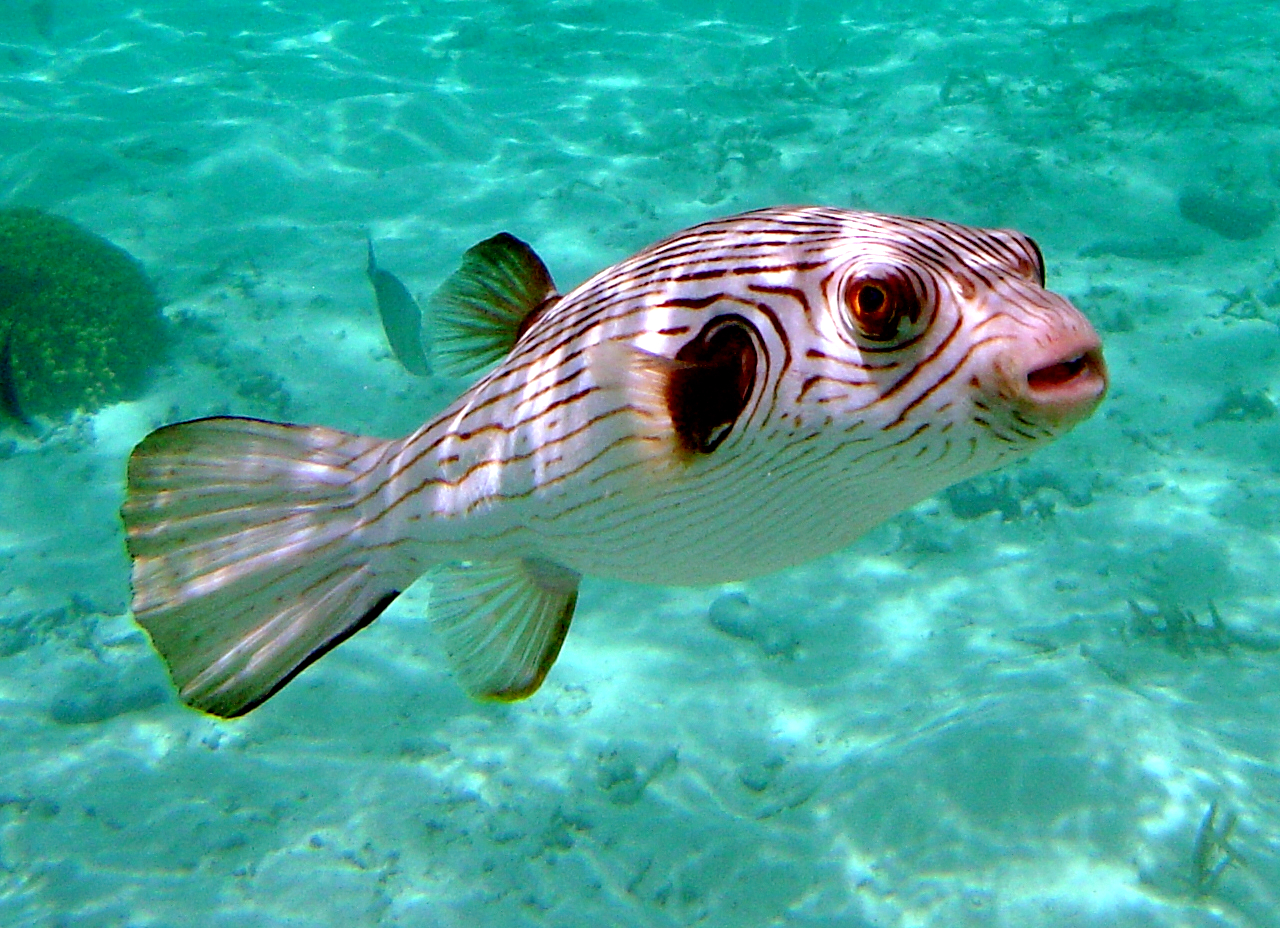
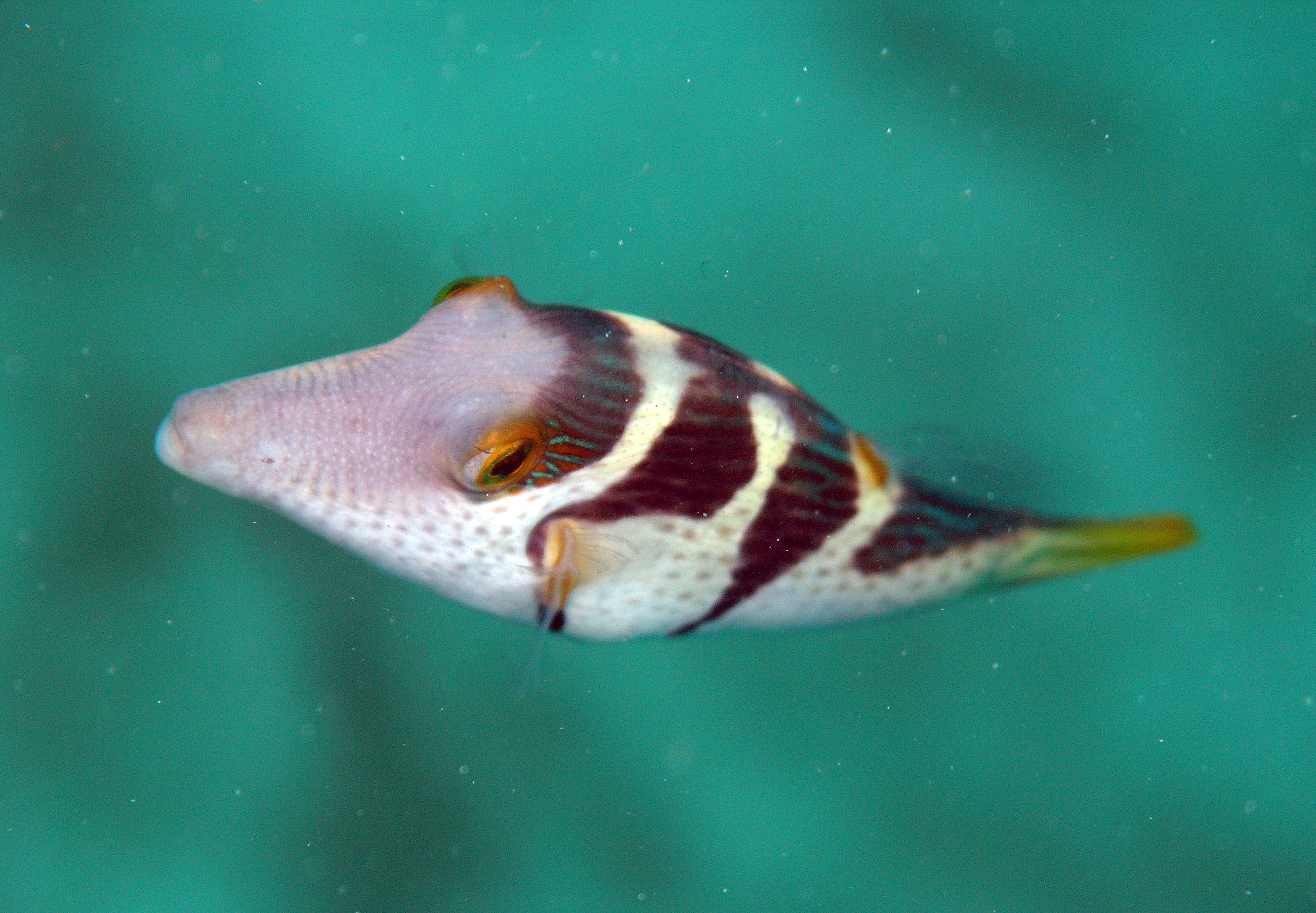
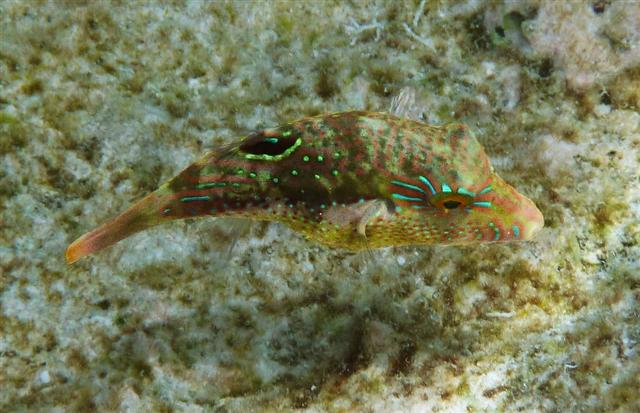
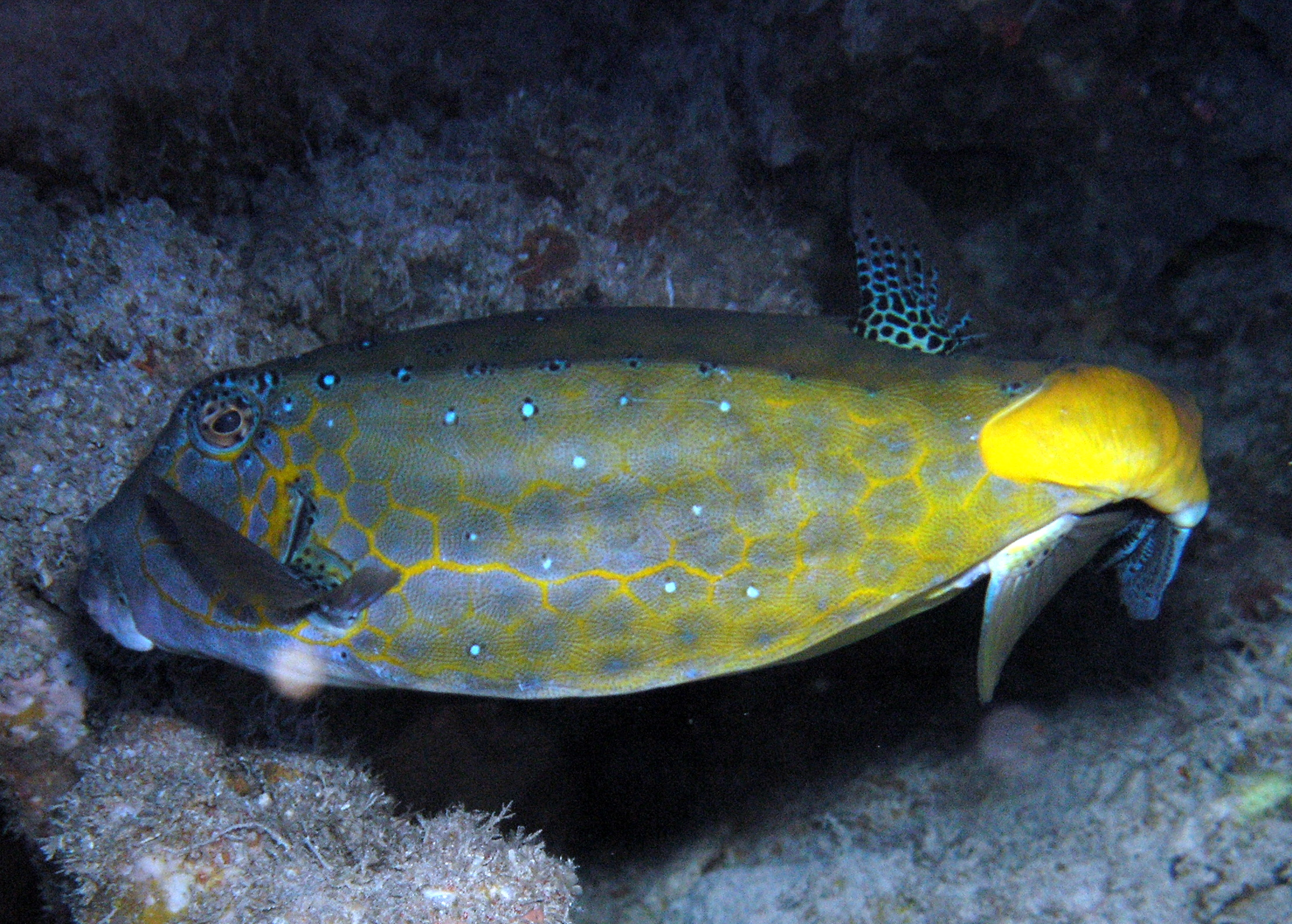
Common name	Image	Taxonomy	Reef safe	Description	Max size
Golden puffer		Arothron meleagris	No		48 cm (18.9 in)
Hawaiian blue puffer		Canthigaster papua	No		10 cm (3.9 in)
Hawaiian saddle puffer		Canthigaster coronata	No		14.0 cm (5.5 in)
Hawaiian spotted puffer		Canthigaster jactator	No		9 cm (3.5 in)
Helmet cowfish		Tetrosomus gibbosus	Caution	Tan with dark speckles and brown spots at the base of the caudal fin.	30 cm (11.8 in)
Immaculate puffer		Arothron immaculatus	No		28 cm (11.0 in)
Longhorn cowfish		Lactoria cornuta	Caution	Grayish tan with very distinctive "horns" near the eyes and under the caudal fin.	46 cm (18.1 in)
Scribbled boxfish		Ostracion solorensis	Caution	Dark navy blue with iridescent "scribbling" and spots.	12 cm (4.7 in)
Dogface pufferfish		Arothron nigropunctatus	Caution	Tan with a brown mask over eyes and other over mouth. Also has yellow markings on the pectoral and dorsal fins.	33 cm (13.0 in)
Map puffer		Arothron mappa	No		65 cm (25.6 in)
Porcupine pufferfish		Diodon holocanthus	No	Tan with slightly darker spots throughout and very conspicuous spines that lay flat against the body. When puffed up, the spikes stand up and make the fish completely inedible.	50 cm (19.7 in)
Spotfin porcupinefish		Diodon hystrix	No	White and covered in small black spots.	91 cm (35.8 in)
Sharpnose pufferfish		Canthigaster rostrata	Caution	Cream, with reddish purple topside and underside, and yellow on the caudal fin.	12 cm (4.7 in)
Star puffer		Arothron stellatus	No		120 cm (47.2 in)
Stars and stripes puffer		Arothron hispidus	No		50 cm (19.7 in)
Striped dogface puffer		Arothron manilensis	No		31 cm (12.2 in)
Valentini pufferfish		Canthigaster valentini	Caution	Tan with giraffe-like spots and dark brown markings that resemble saddles over the back. Has distinctive bright green eyes.	11 cm (4.3 in)
Whitebelly puffer		Canthigaster bennetti	No		10 cm (3.9 in)
Yellow boxfish		Ostracion cubicus	Caution	Usually seen as a juvenile, bright yellow with little black spots. When it reaches maturity it is gray with yellow lines and pink lips.	45 cm (17.7 in)

== Butterflyfish ==
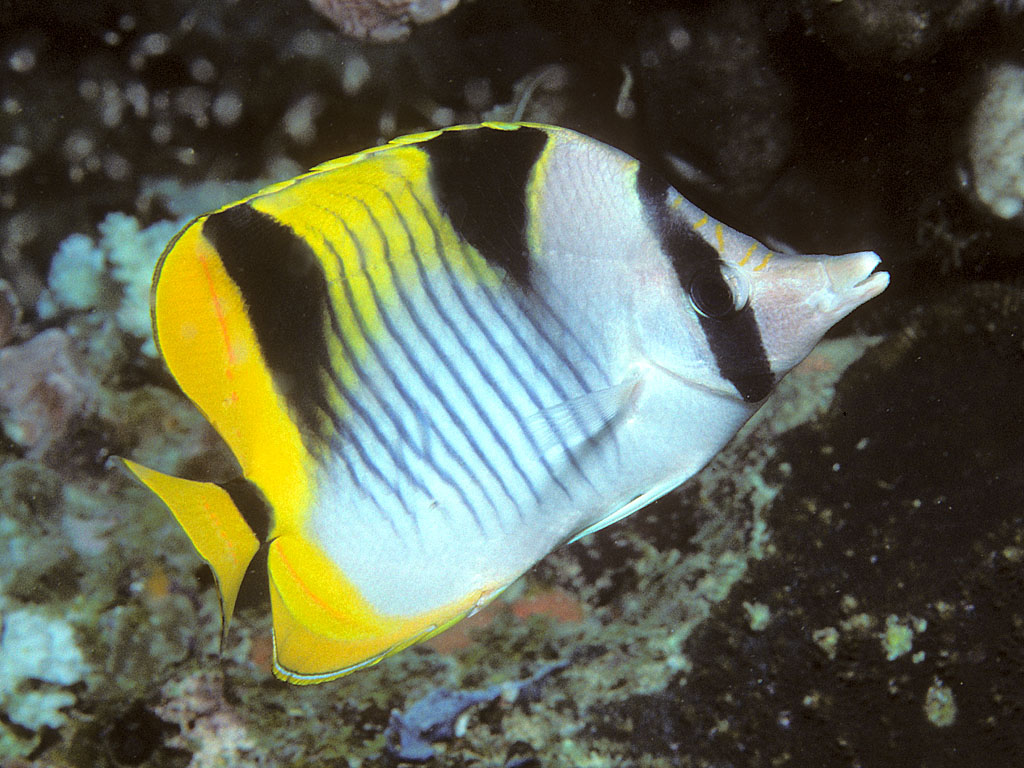
Sickle butterflyfish

When properly cared for, Butterflyfish can make beautiful and distinctive additions to fish only marine aquariums. Specimens often grow to large sizes and are not well suited to smaller aquariums. Butterflyfish can be fussy and overparticular, but when fed a varied diet and kept in pristine conditions they will usually thrive. Some species in this family do not do well in captivity, and potential keepers must take care to purchase only those species that have a fighting chance. When selecting Butterflyfish especially, specimens presenting any sign or signs of mishandling are to be avoided.

The following species are relatively hardy and experienced aquarists should have no trouble with them, so long as they are diligent.

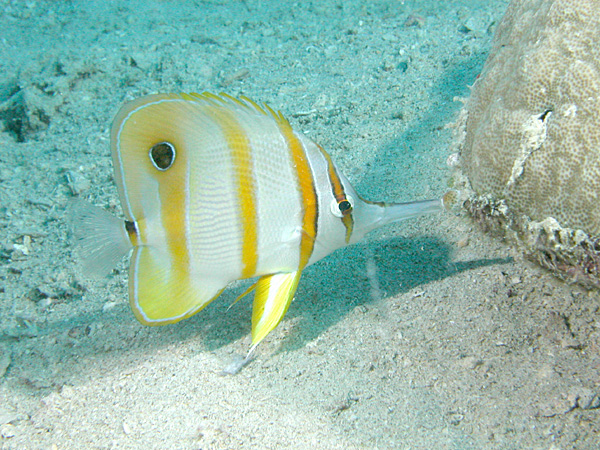
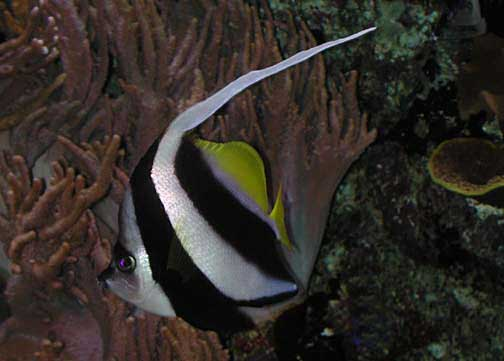
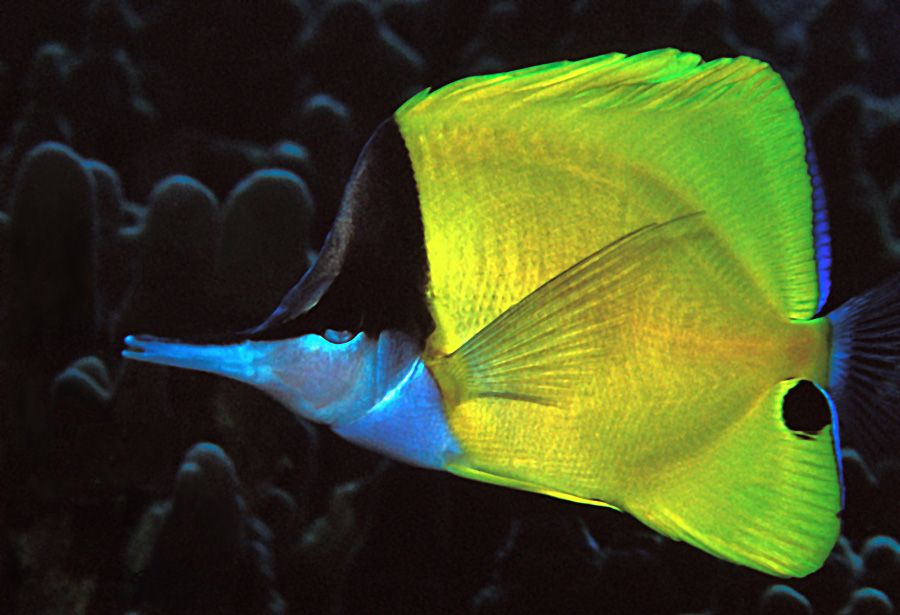
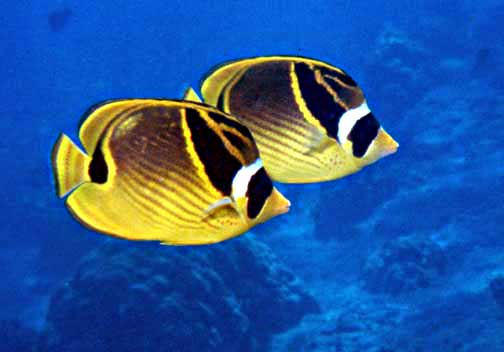
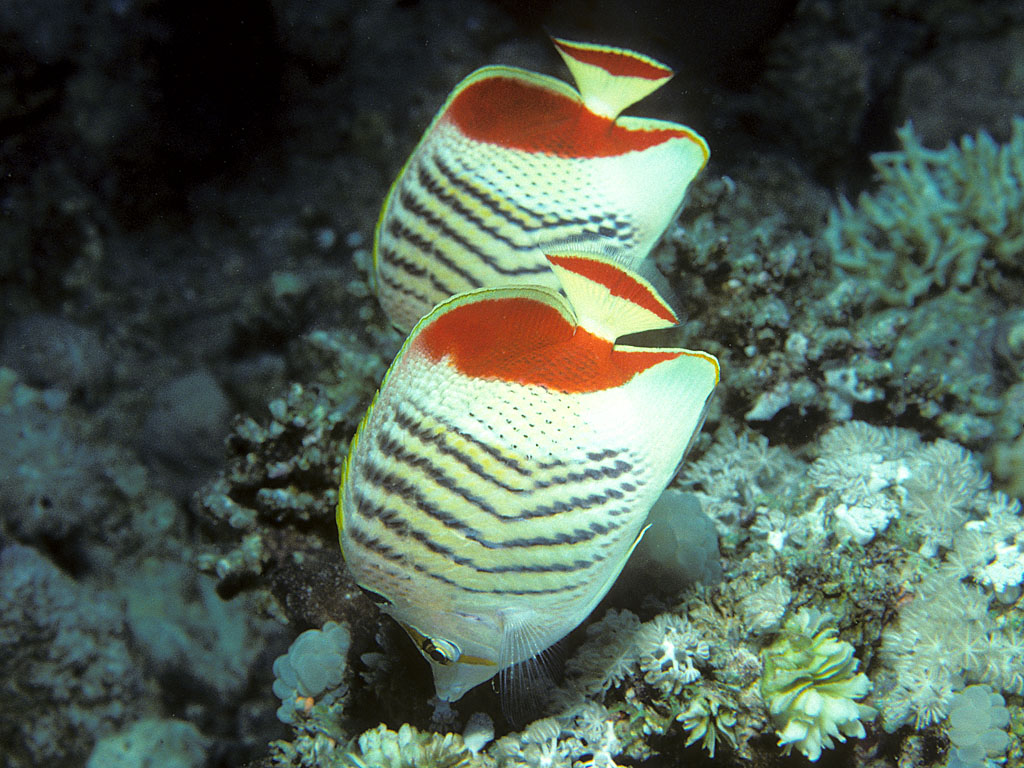
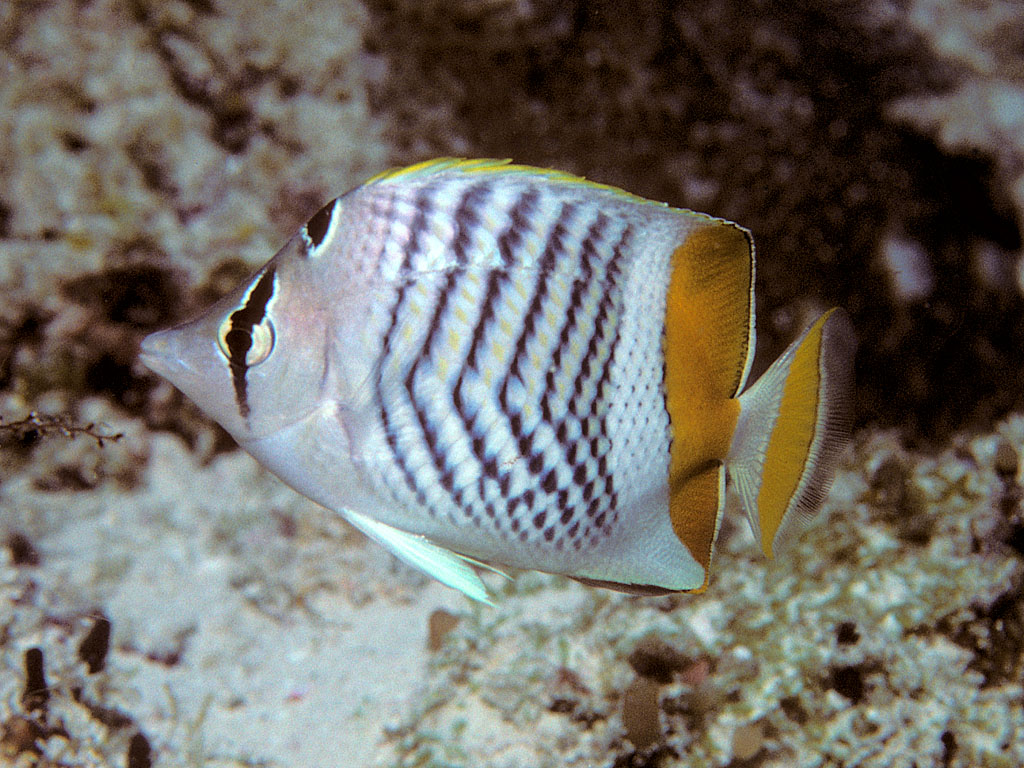
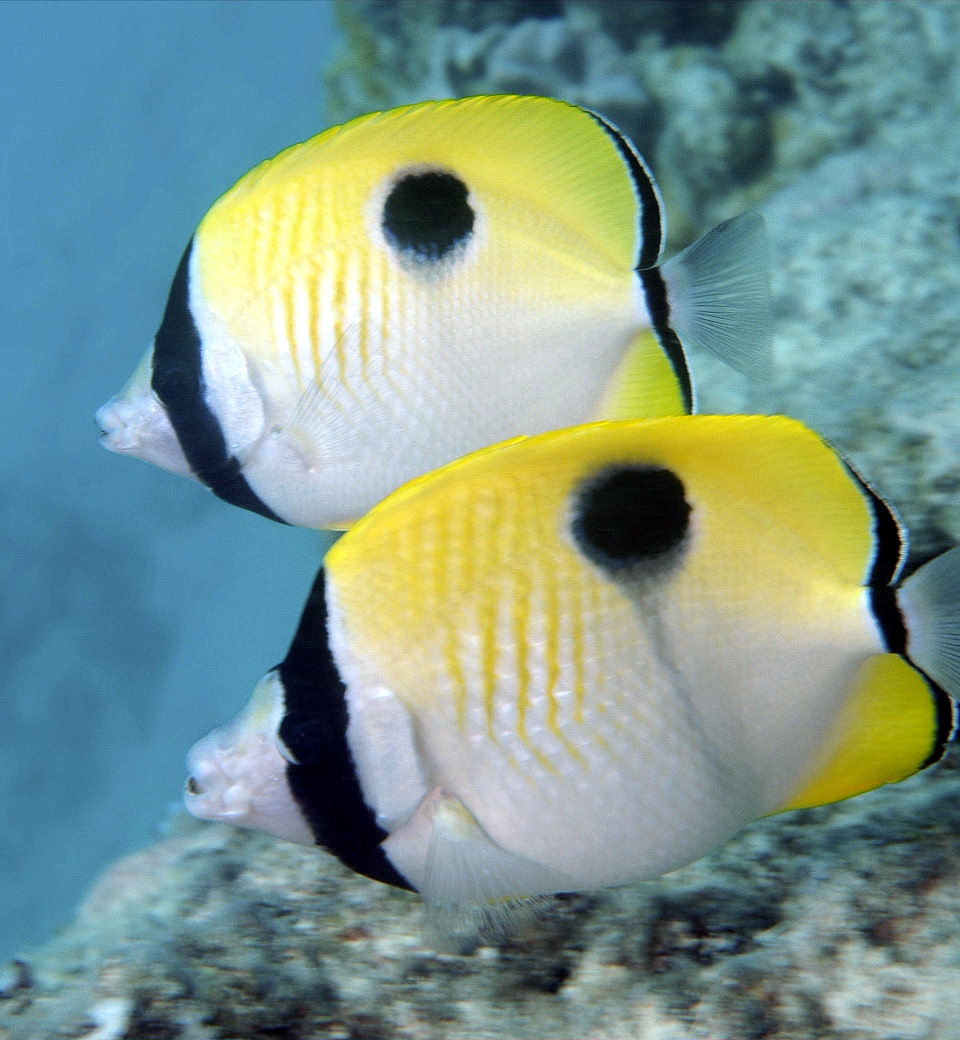
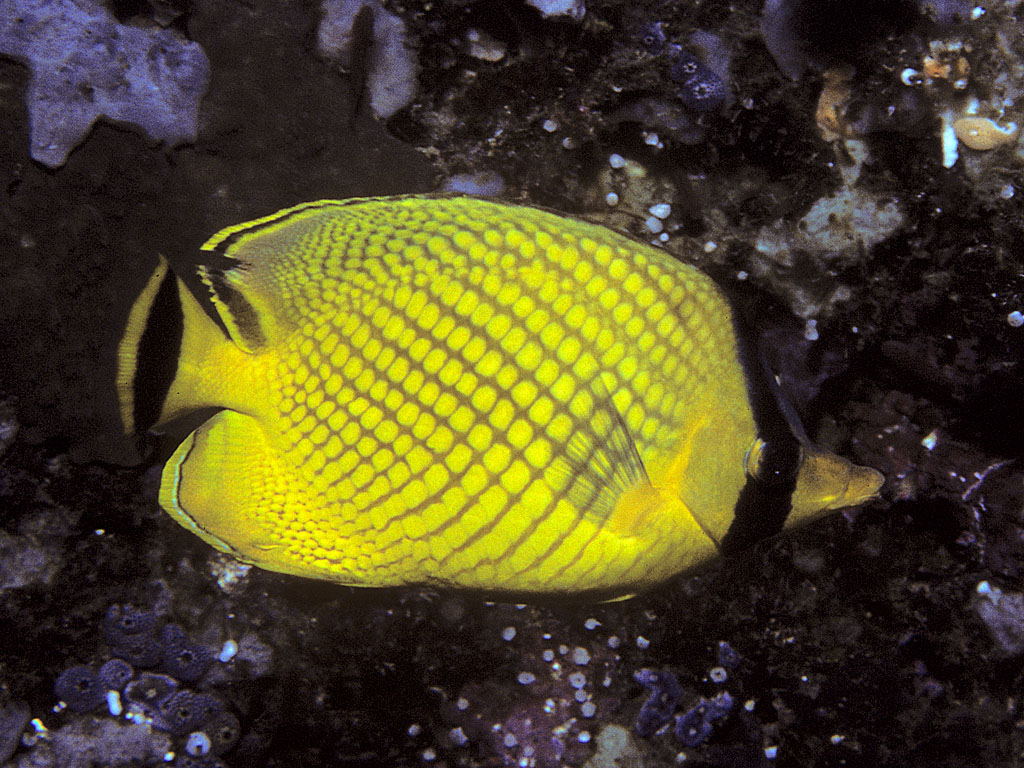
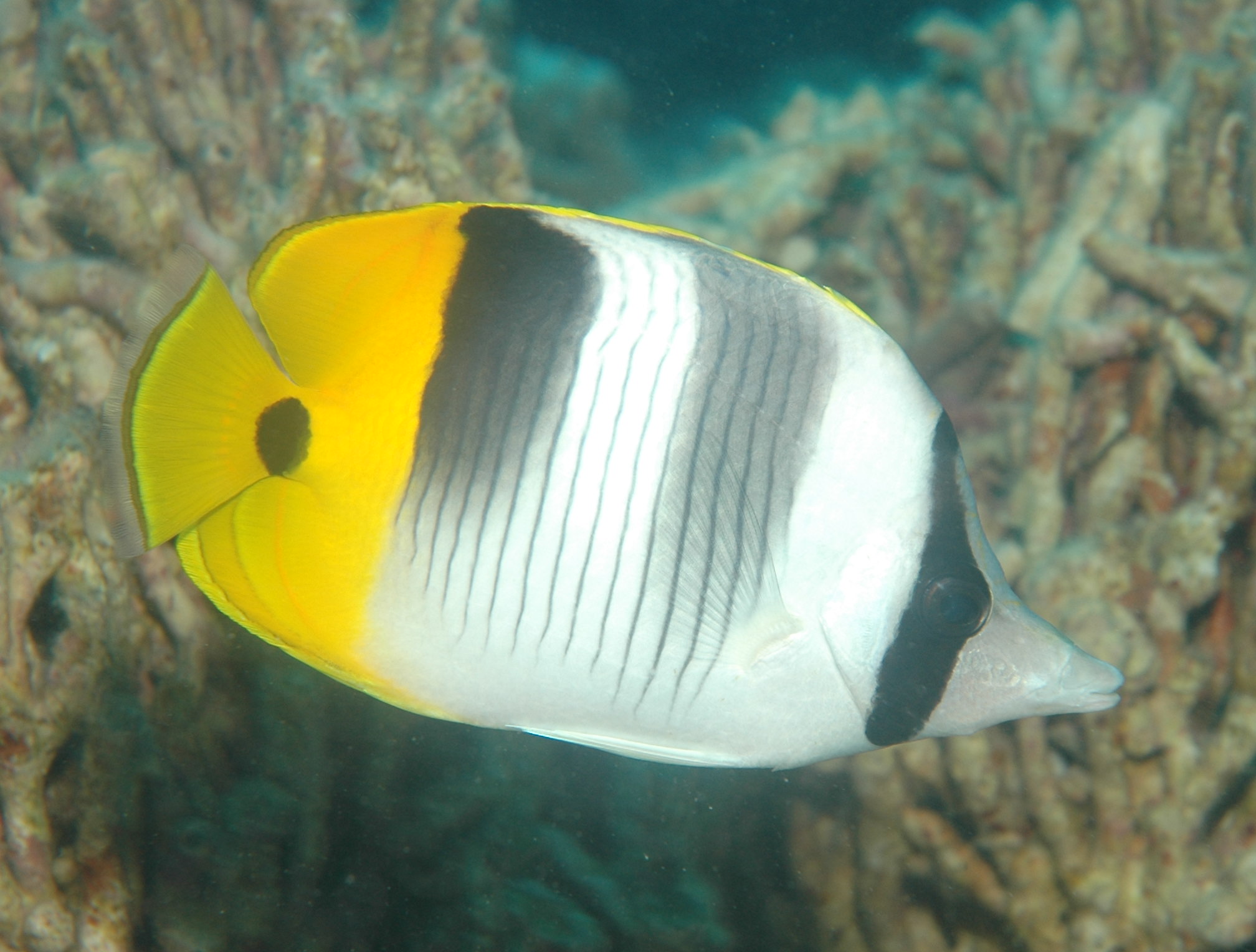
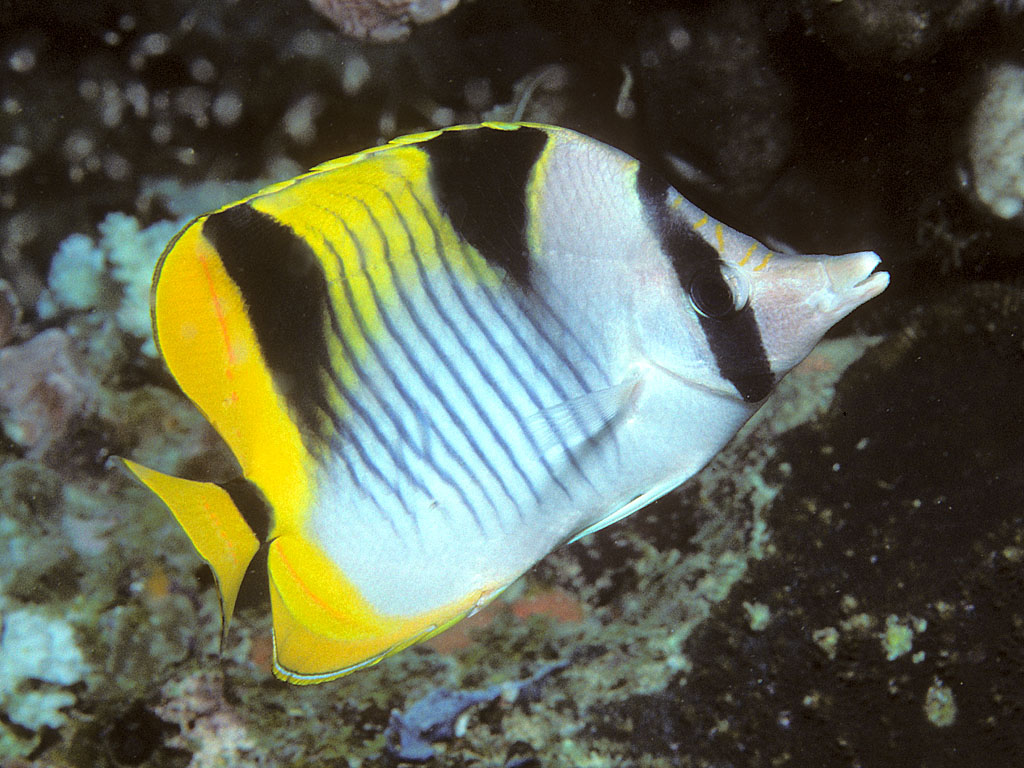
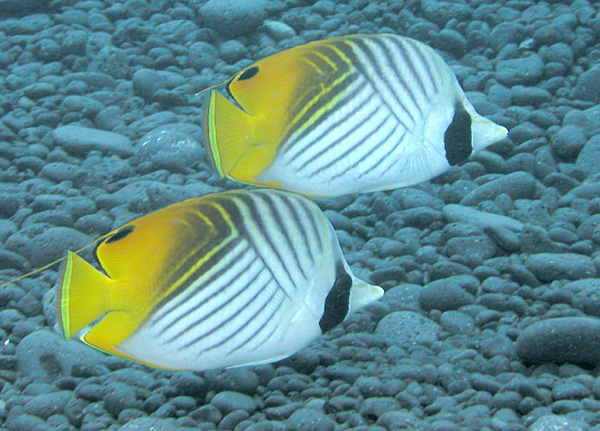
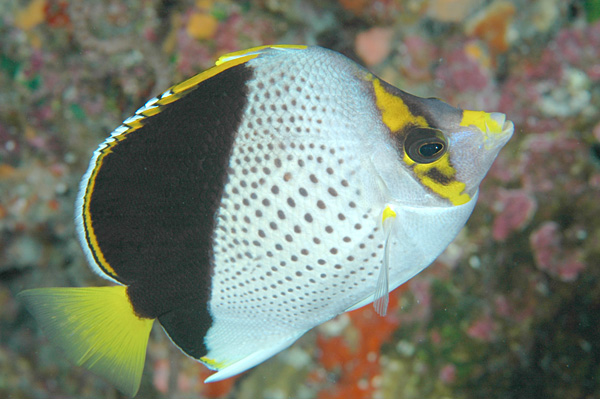
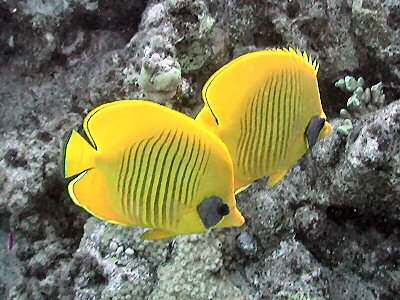
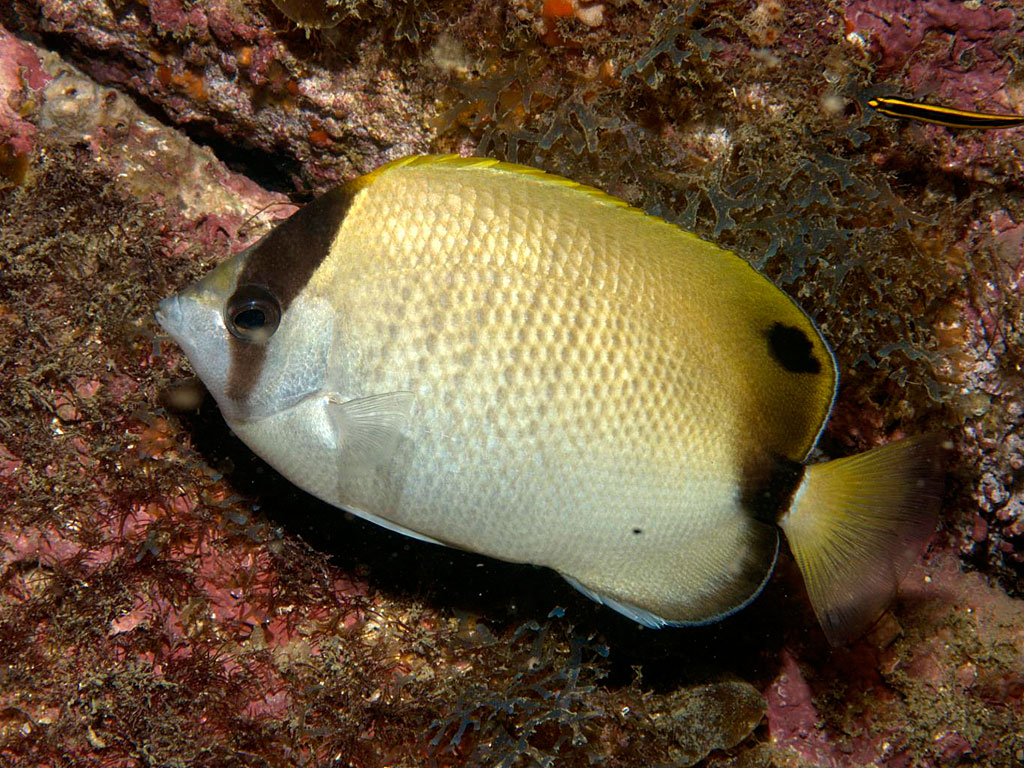
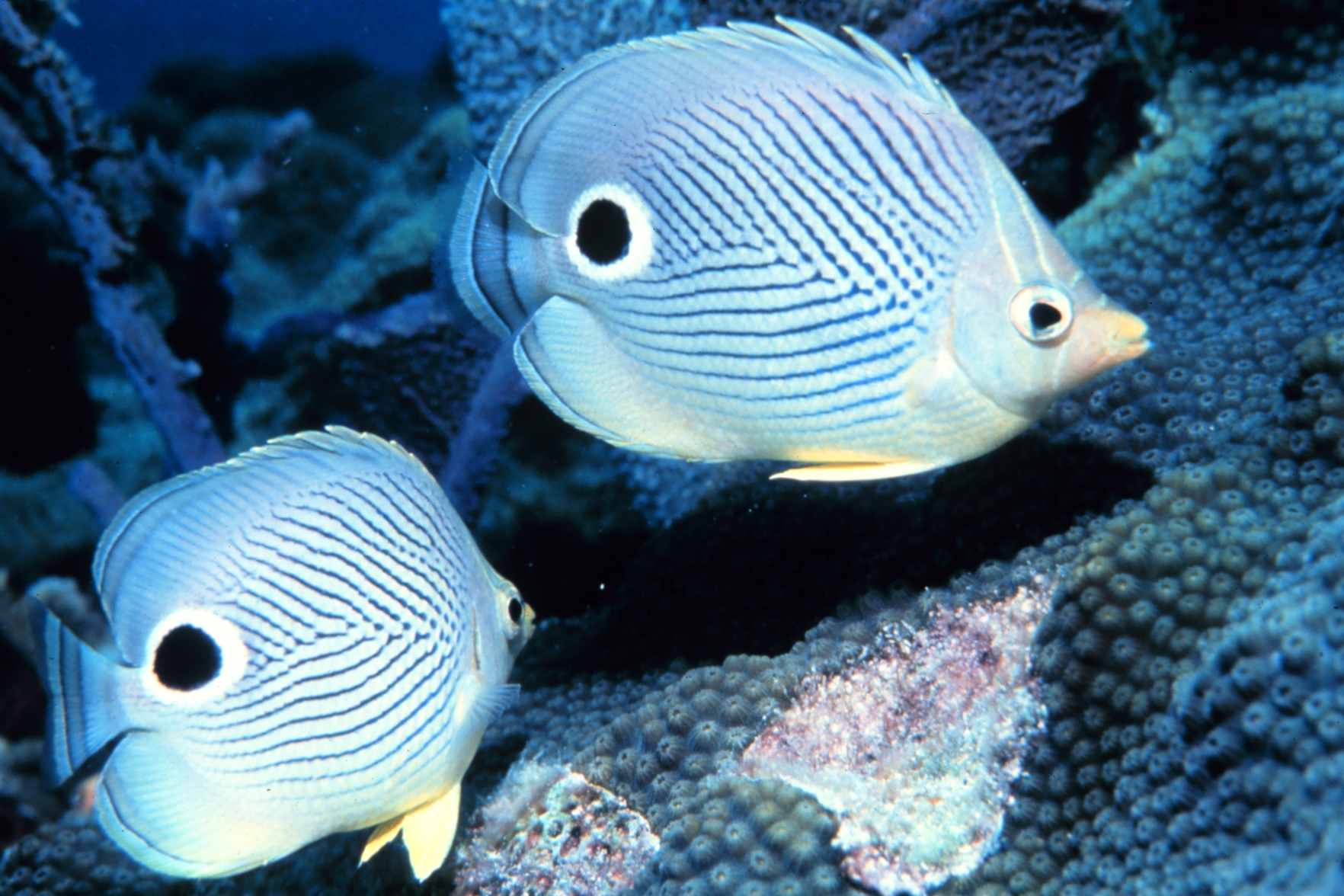
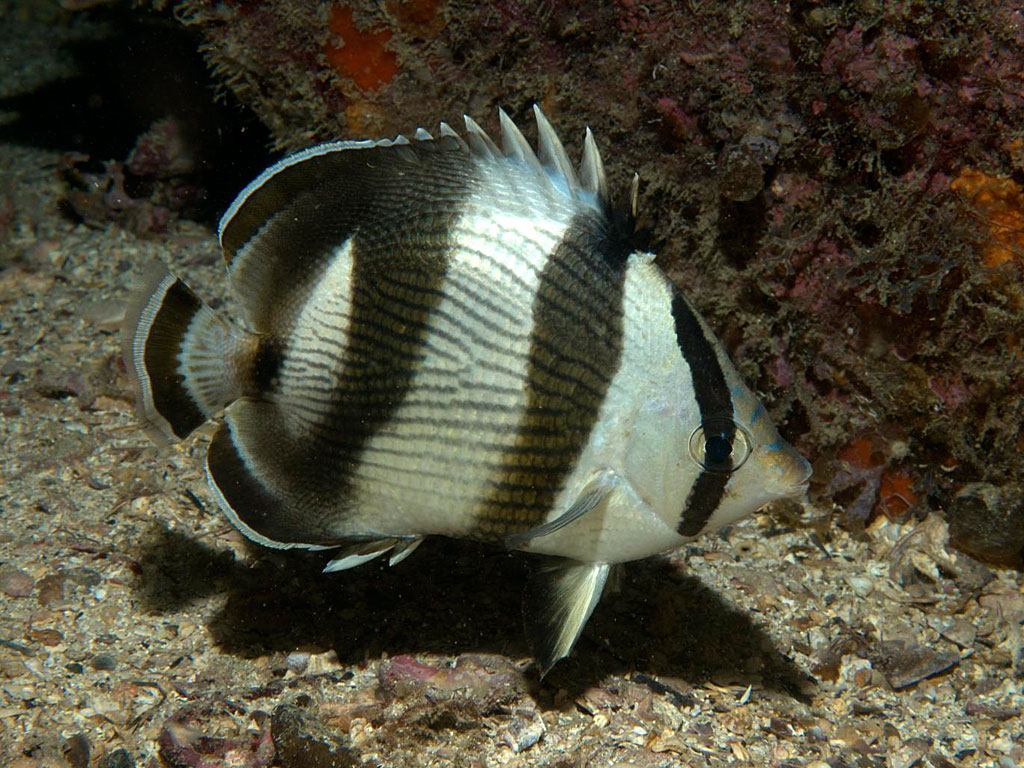
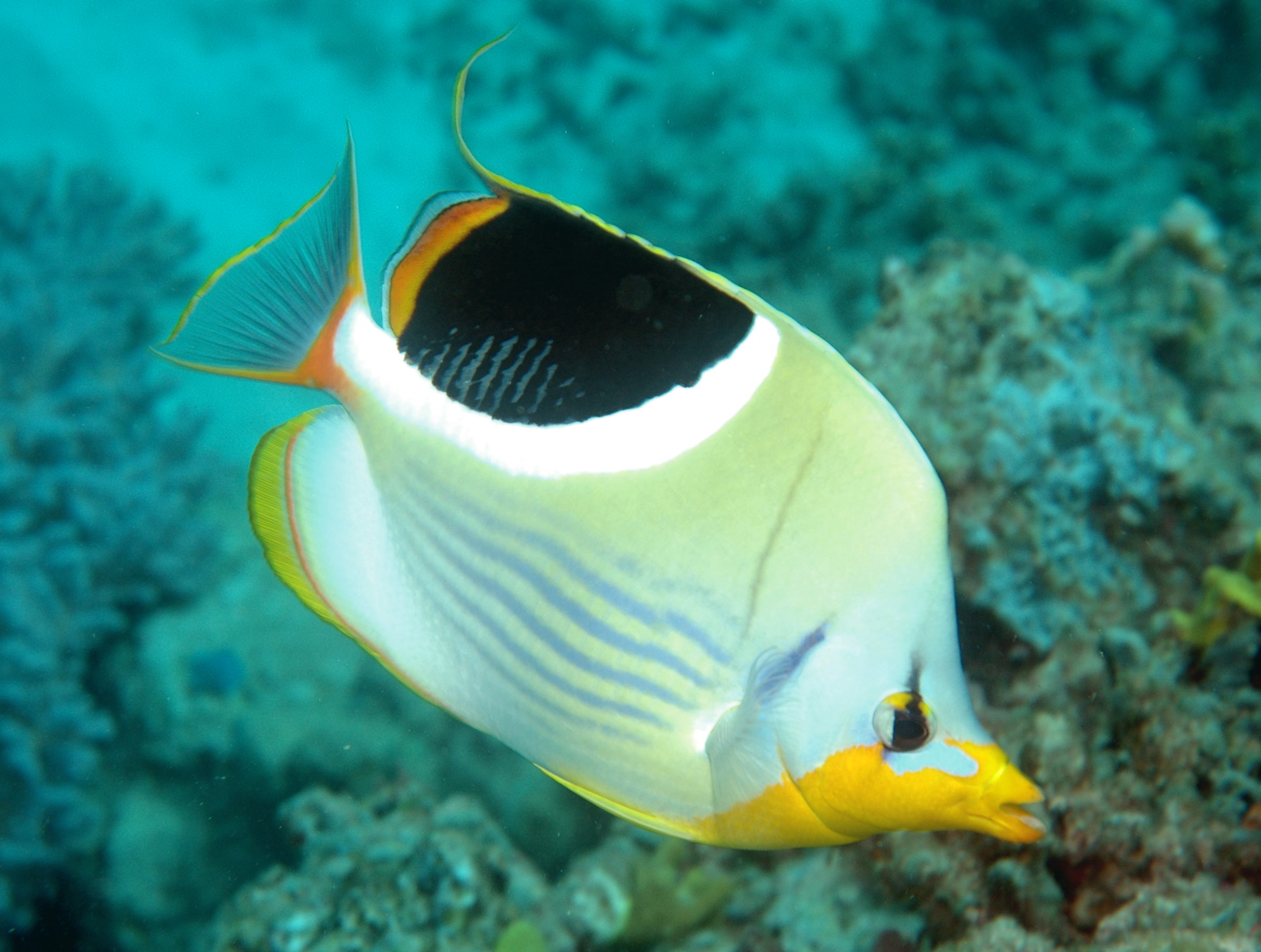
Common name	Image	Taxonomy	Reef safe	Description	Max size
Copperband butterflyfish		Chelmon rostratus	Caution	Silver with black edged gold stripes, a long nose, and a black eyespot on the dorsal fin.	20 cm (7.9 in)
Schooling bannerfish		Heniochus diphreutes	No	Sometimes referred to as the "Poor Man's Moorish Idol" because of the resemblance to one. White and black striped with yellow caudal fin and a dorsal fin that forms a long, thin banner.	21 cm (8.3 in)
Longnose butterflyfish		Forcipiger flavissimus	No	From the pectoral fins forward, black above the eye and silver below, with an exceptionally mouth. Past the pectoral fins, bright yellow with an eyespot on the anal fin.	22 cm (8.7 in)
Raccoon butterflyfish		Chaetodon lunula	No	Very distinctive and complexly colored. Is mostly yellow with a darker saddle and a black and white mask.	20 cm (7.9 in)
Redback butterflyfish		Chaetodon paucifasciatus	No	White with black stripes that form chevrons on the side and a bright red patch on the posterior.	14 cm (5.5 in)
Merten's butterflyfish		Chaetodon mertensii	No	White with fuzzy black stripes and a yellow posterior. Also has a black line through the eye.	12.5 cm (4.9 in)
Teardrop butterflyfish		Chaetodon unimaculatus	No	Completely yellow with the exception of black stripes at the base of the caudal fin and through the eye, and an eyespot directly below the dorsal fin.	20 cm (7.9 in)
Latticed butterflyfish		Chaetodon rafflesii	No	Very similar to C. unimaculatus, but with scales that are brighter than the body, forming a lattice-like pattern, and lacking the eyespot.	18 cm (7.1 in)
Pacific double saddle butterflyfish		Chaetodon ulietensis	No	Silver with two dark saddles over the body (plus a dark mask) and yellow dorsal and caudal fins.	15 cm (5.9 in)
Sickle butterflyfish		Chaetodon falcula	No	Often confused with C. ulietensis, but easily distinguished. The saddles are wedge shaped rather than stripes and do not reach the underside. Overall more yellow coloring.	20 cm (7.9 in)
Threadfin butterflyfish		Chaetodon auriga	No	White anterior with thin black stripes at 45 and 120 degree angles from the head. Posterior is yellow, but with a black wedge shape where the stripes meet the yellow coloring.	23 cm (9.1 in)
Tinker's butterflyfish		Chaetodon tinkeri	No	White with small black spots, a yellow mask, and a black dorsal fin.	15 cm (5.9 in)
Masked butterflyfish		Chaetodon semilarvatus	No	Bright lemon yellow with subtle vertical orange stripes and a black splotch behind the eye.	23 cm (9.1 in)
Reef butterflyfish		Chaetodon sedentarius	Yes		15 cm (5.9 in)
Four-eyed butterflyfish		Chaetodon capistratus	No		15 cm (5.9 in)
Banded butterflyfish		Chaetodon striatus	No		16 cm (6.3 in)
Saddleback butterflyfish		Chaetodon ephippium	Caution		30 cm (11.8 in)

== Cardinalfish ==
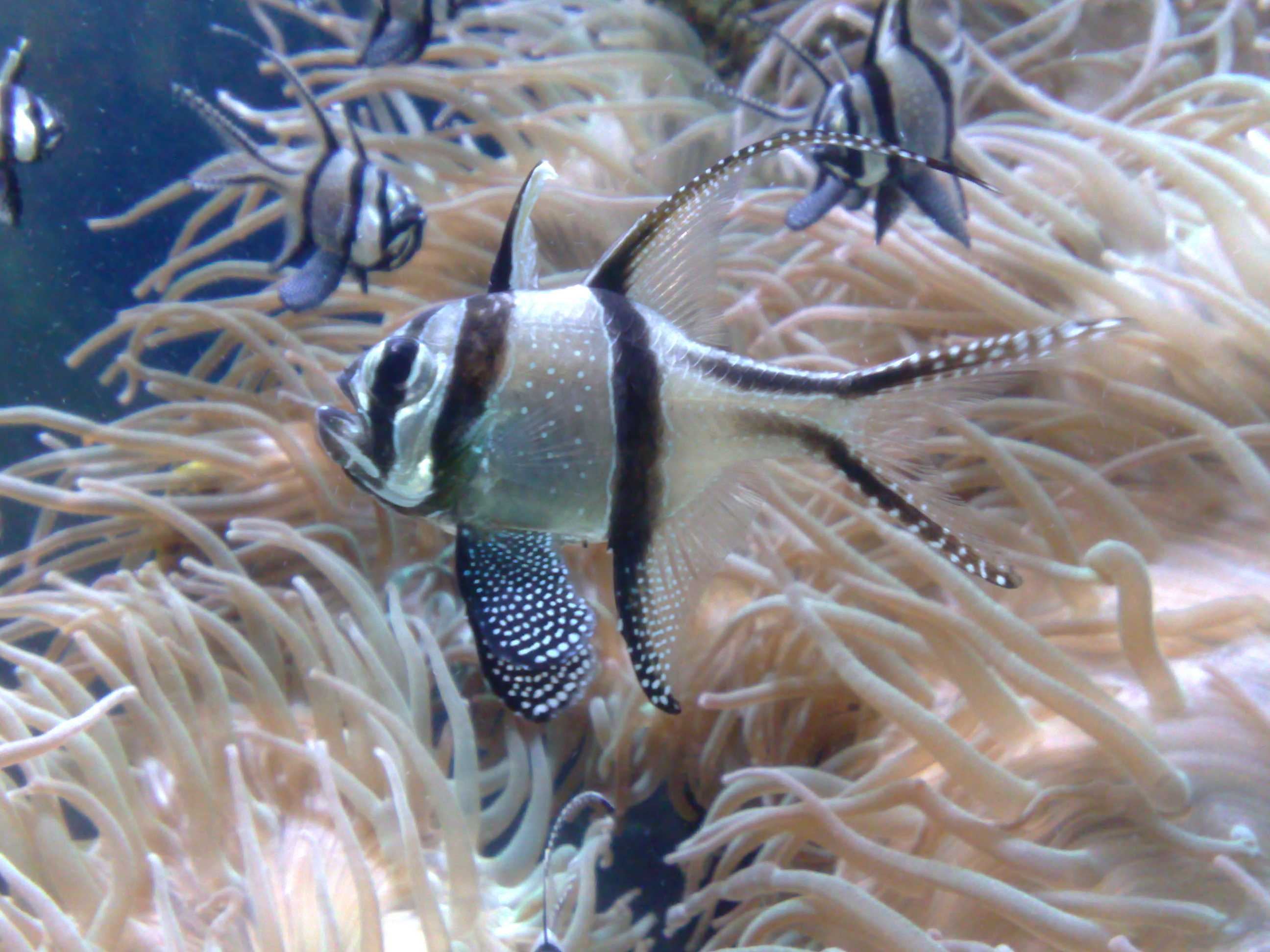
Banggai cardinalfish

One of the few groups of shoaling fish commonly available to marine aquarists, Cardinalfish are nocturnal and tend to be quite shy. They require meaty foods and will often not take prepared foods such as flakes and tablets. For the best chance of success, keep a wide variety of frozen foods on hand. In the event of a hunger strike, they will almost always take adult brine shrimp. As far as other care requirements they are similar to damsels: not picky. So long as they are properly acclimated, they tolerate a wide range of parameters. A marine aquarist should watch the ammonia/nitrite levels of the environment, as cardinalfish are particularly sensitive to these chemicals.

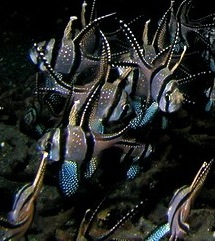
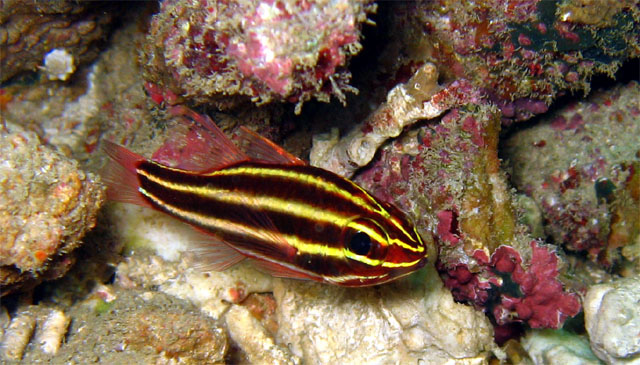
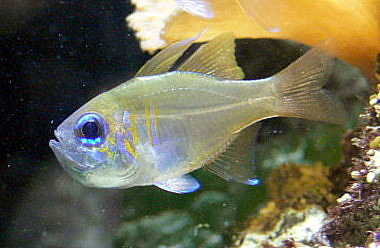
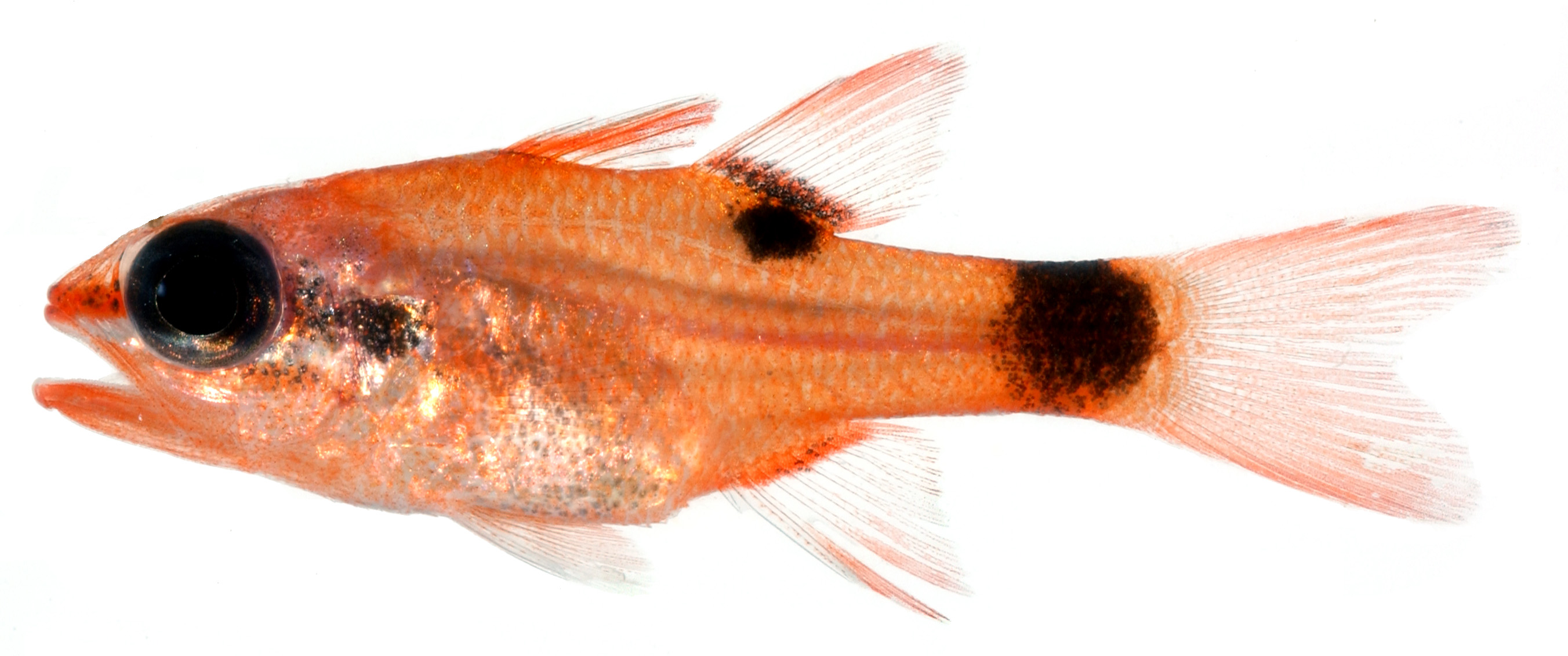
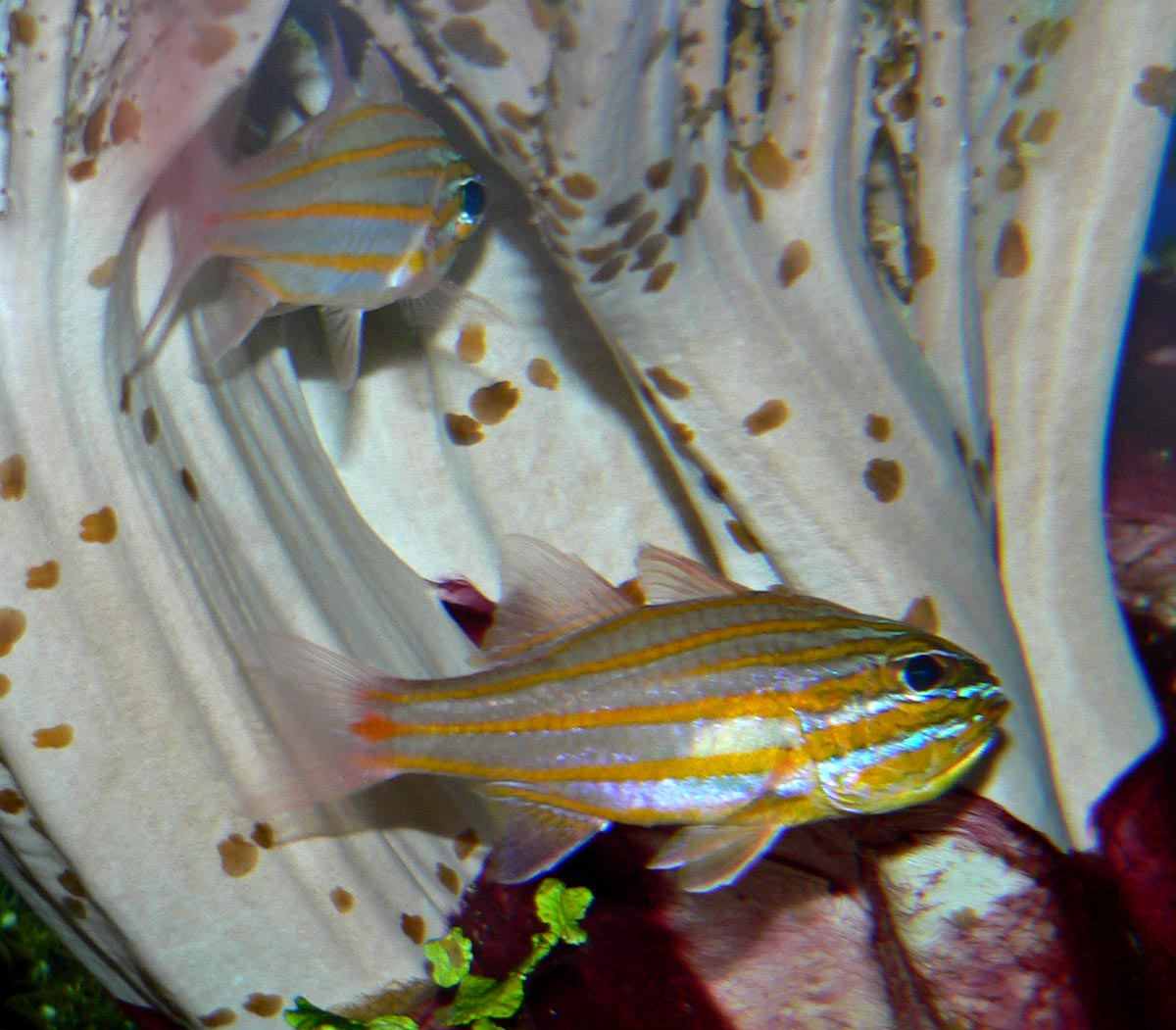
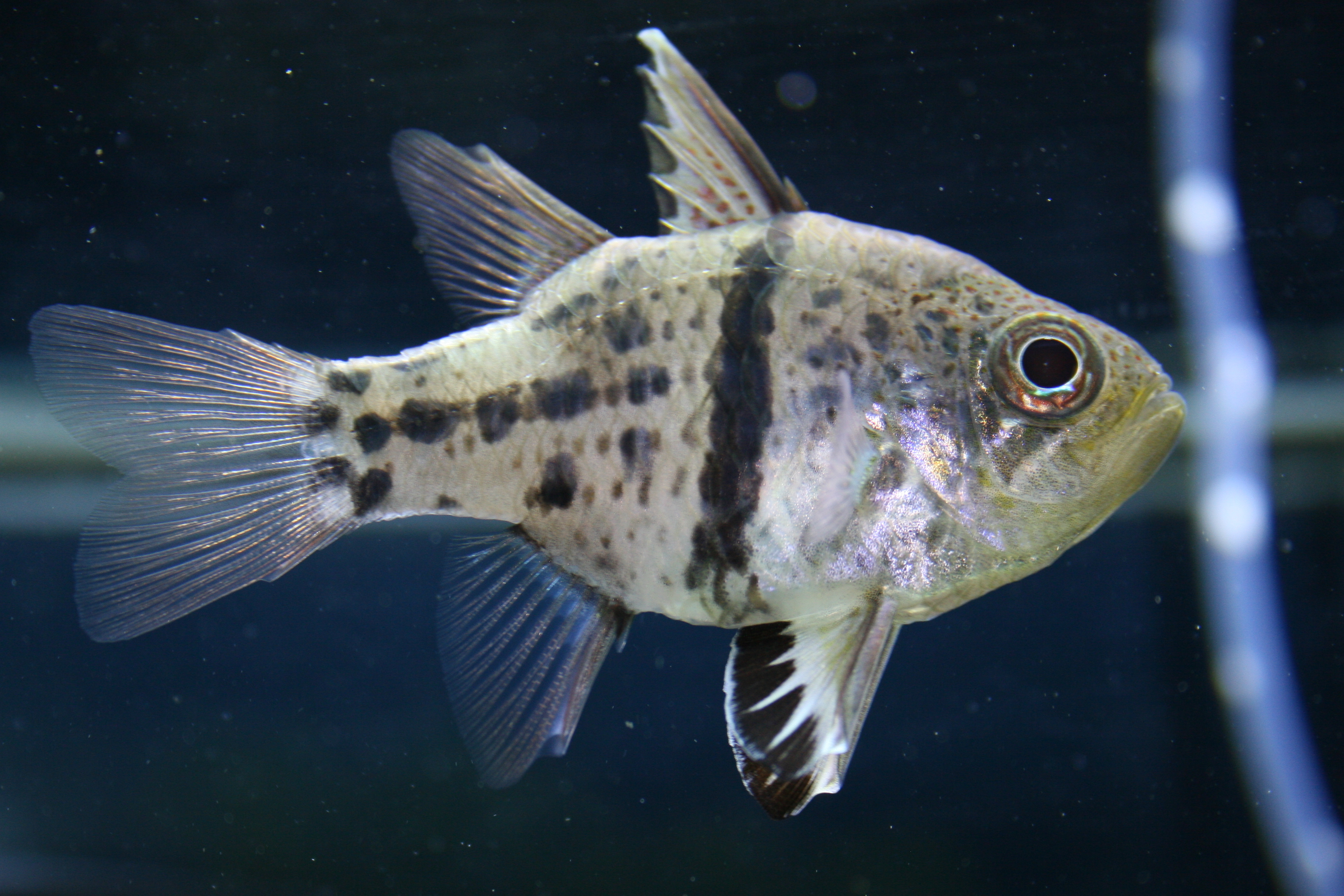
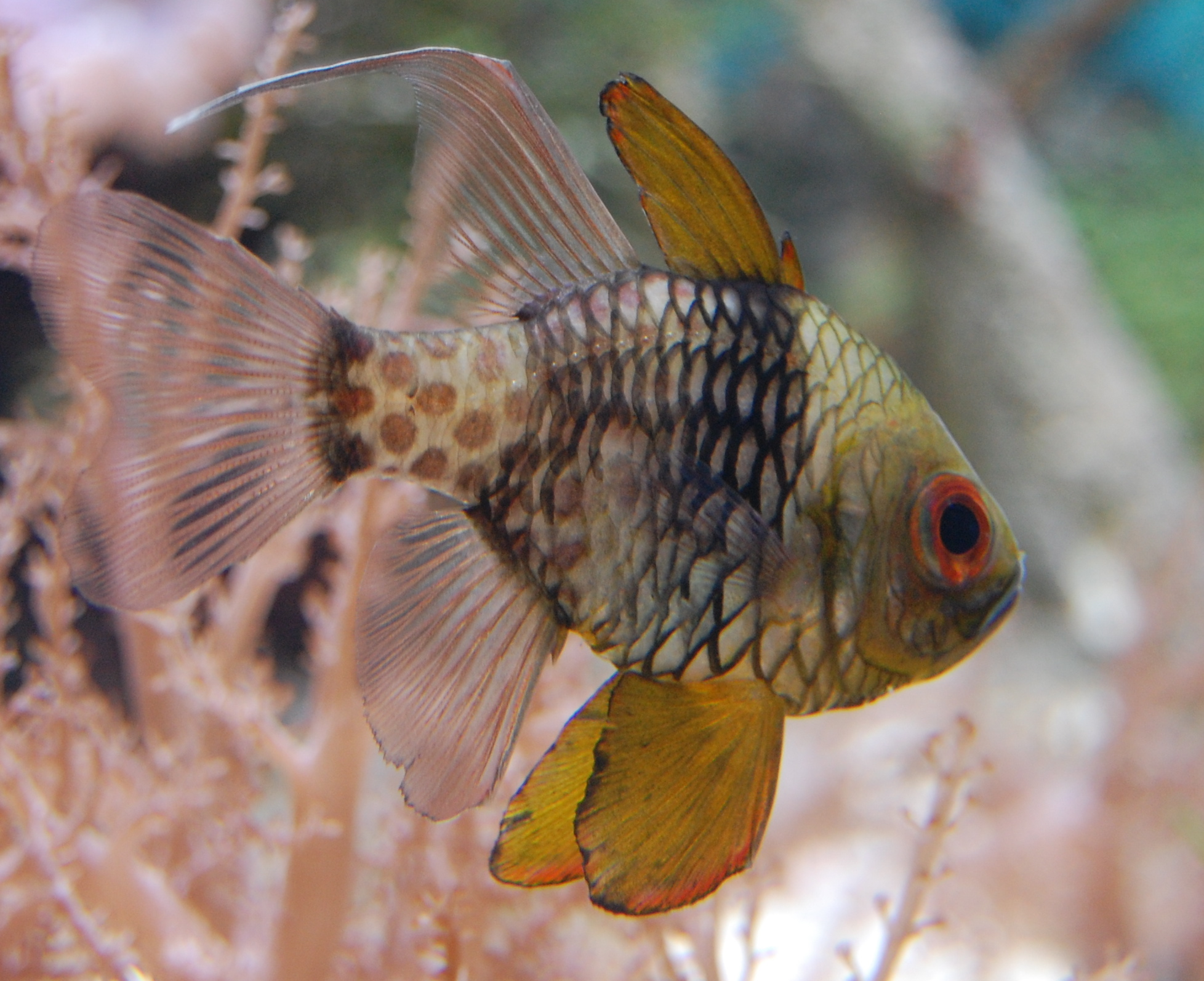
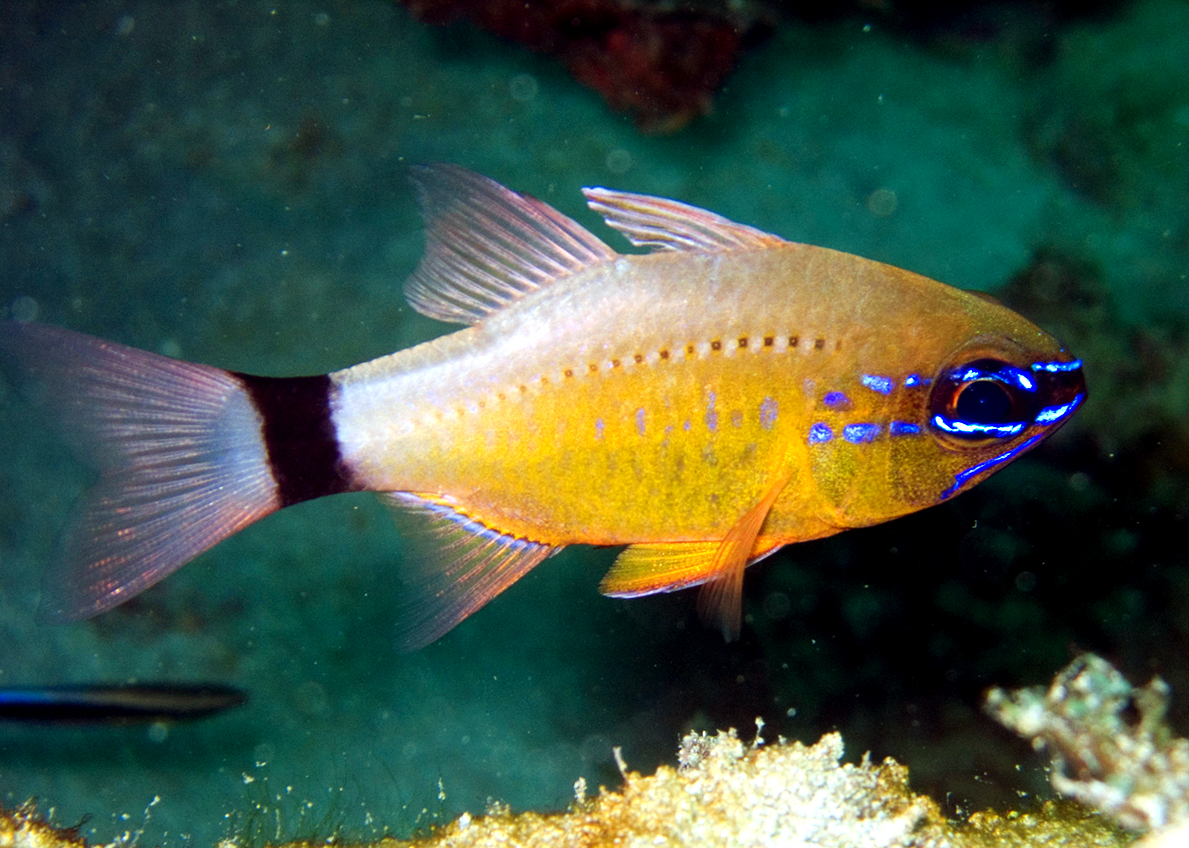
Common name	Image	Taxonomy	Reef safe	Description	Max size
Fragile cardinalfish		Apogon fragilis	Yes		5 cm (2.0 in)
Banggai cardinal		Pterapogon kauderni	Yes	Black and silver striped with very tall fins and many white spots. Wild populations have been decimated, consider captive bred specimens. Banggai Cardinalfish are mouthbrooders.	8 cm (3.1 in)
Blackstripe cardinalfish		Apogon nigrofasciatus	Yes	Body completely covered in horizontal yellow and black stripes, with red fins.	10 cm (3.9 in)
Bluebarred cardinalfish		Apogon flores	Yes		5 cm (2.0 in)
Bluestreak cardinalfish		Apogon leptacanthus	Yes		6.5 cm (2.6 in)
Flamefish		Apogon maculatus	Yes	Bright red with black spots at the base of the caudal fin, under the second dorsal fin, and on the operculum.	11 cm (4.3 in)
Frostfin cardinalfish		Apogon hoeveni	Yes		5 cm (2.0 in)
Gilbert's cardinalfish		Apogon gilberti	Yes		5 cm (2.0 in)
Girdled cardinalfish		Archamia zosterophora	Yes		8 cm (3.1 in)
Orange-striped cardinalfish		Ostorhinchus cyanosoma	Yes	Light yellow with iridescent yellow horizontal stripes.	8 cm (3.1 in)
Orbic cardinalfish		Sphaeramia orbicularis	Yes	A thin, dark vertical 'waistband' with scattered dark spots toward the tail.	10 cm (3.9 in)
Pajama cardinalfish		Sphaeramia nematoptera	Yes, caution with small shrimp	This fish displays three distinct color bands: the first, stretching from the nose to base of the first dorsal fin, is a tannish peach. The second, a thin band which runs down the center of the fish, is chocolate brown, and the posterior of the fish is white with brown spots.	8.5 cm (3.3 in)
Ochre-striped cardinalfish		Ostorhinchus compressus	Yes	Almost identical to A. nigrofasticus, but with blue eyes.	12 cm (4.7 in)
Ringtailed cardinalfish		Ostorhinchus aureus	Yes	Yellow body with a black stripe (ring) at the base of the caudal fin and iridescent blue streaks across the eye.	14.5 cm (5.7 in)

== Chromis ==
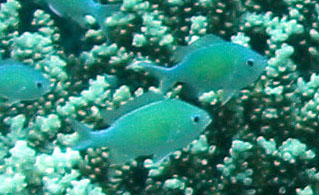
Blue-green reef chromis

Chromis are perhaps the ultimate reef fish. Generally peaceful, most species are easy to take care of and quite colorful. Like anthias, they will school, but in many cases this tendency disappears as they age. They are, nevertheless, at least ambivalent with their own species, as well as completely reef safe. Like damsels and anemonefish, their close cousins, Chromis are omnivores and will accept most foods offered. A flake staple is usually sufficient, but for best color and health supplement with frozen and live foods when possible.

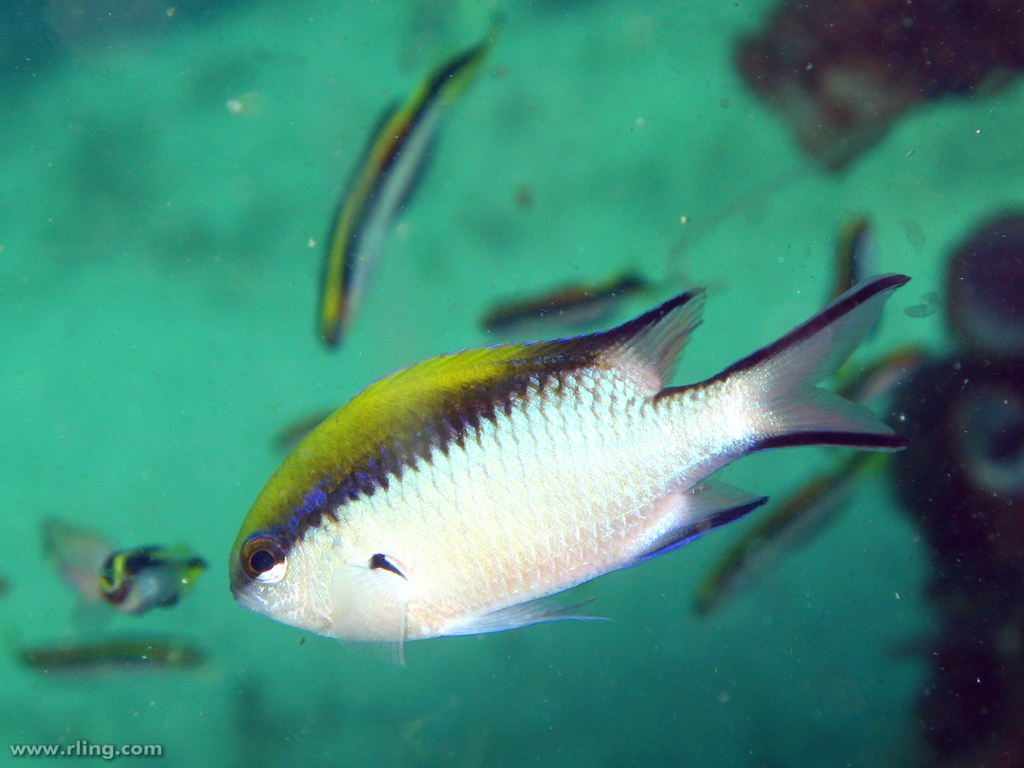
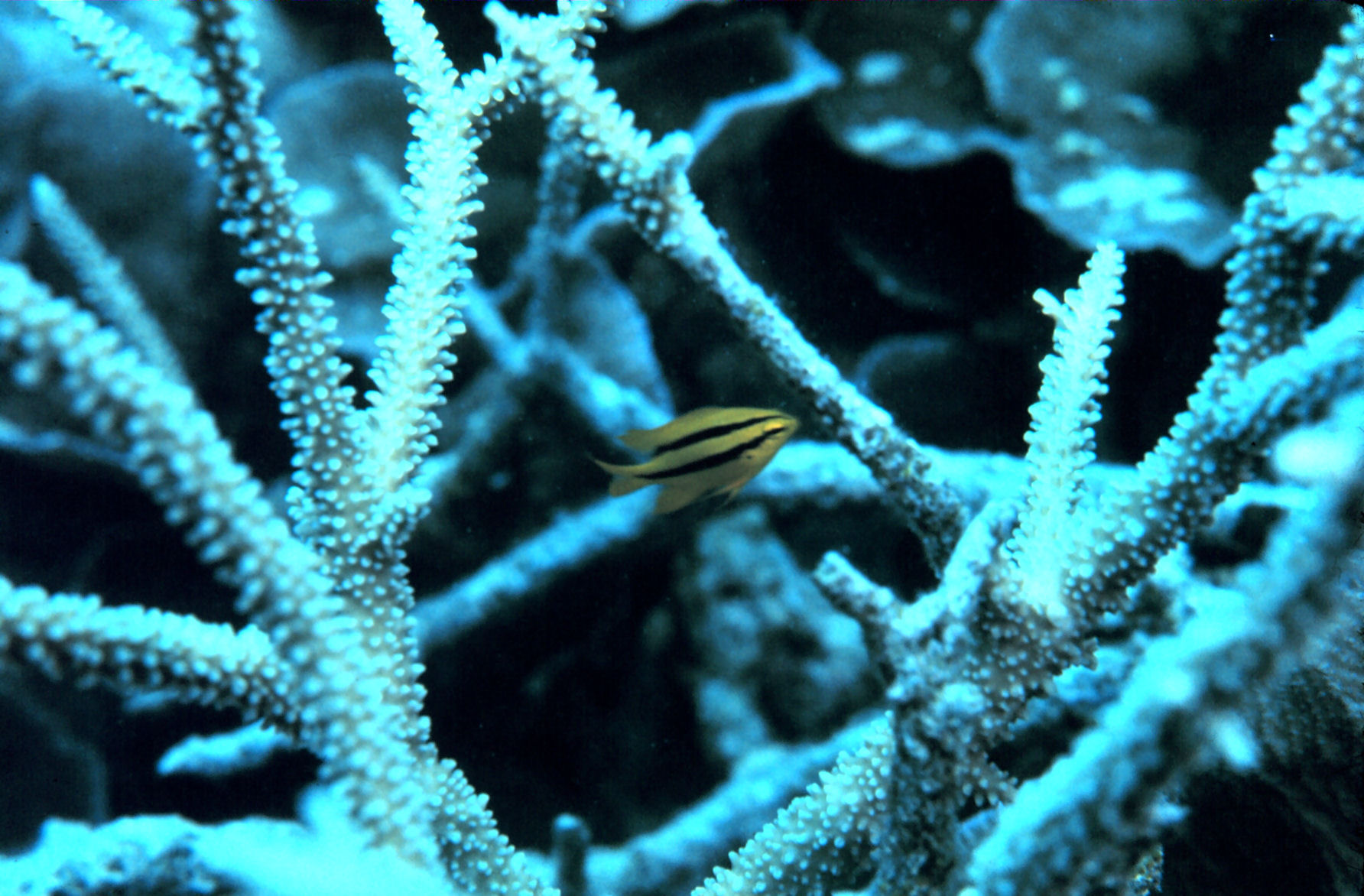
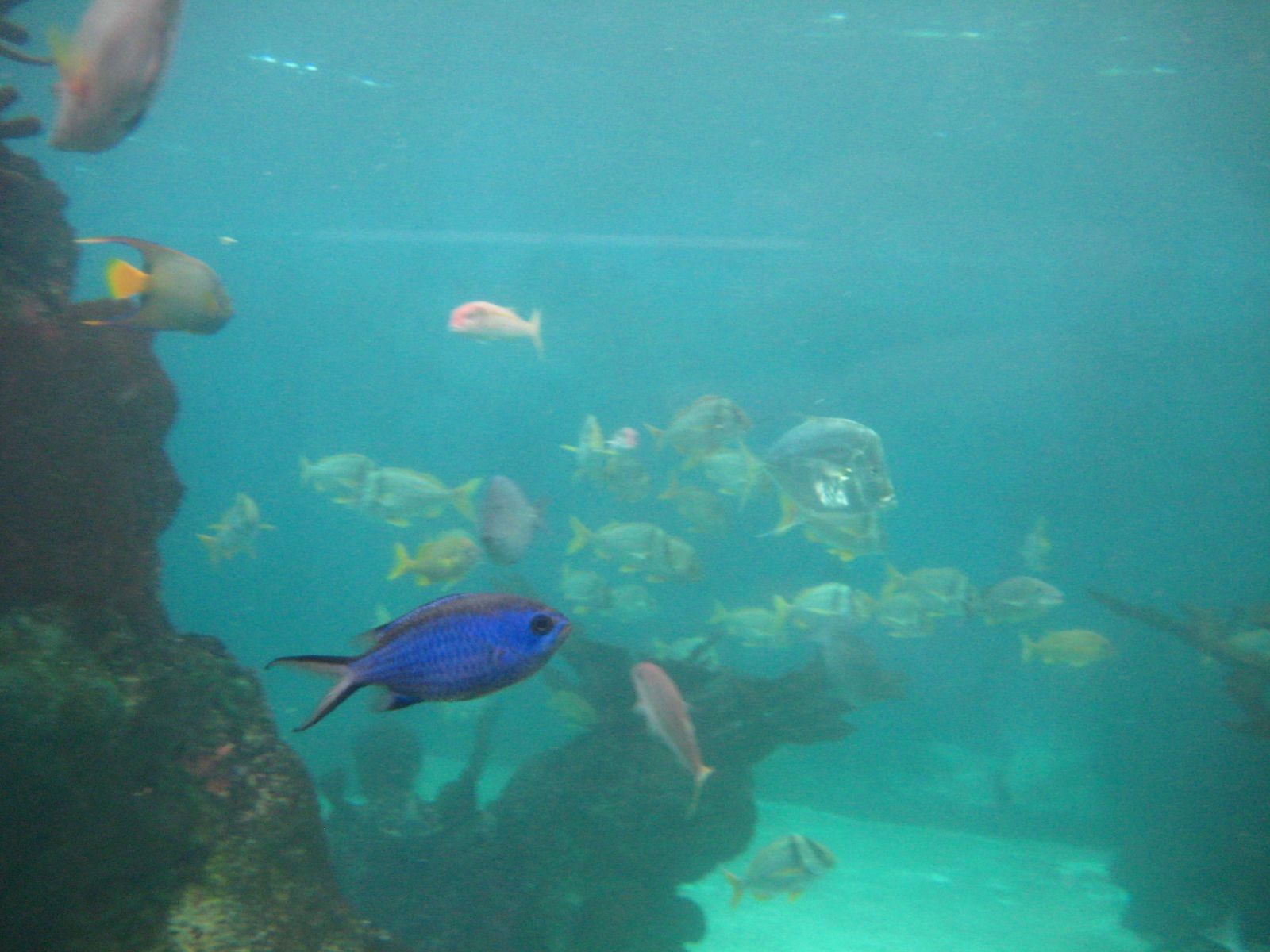
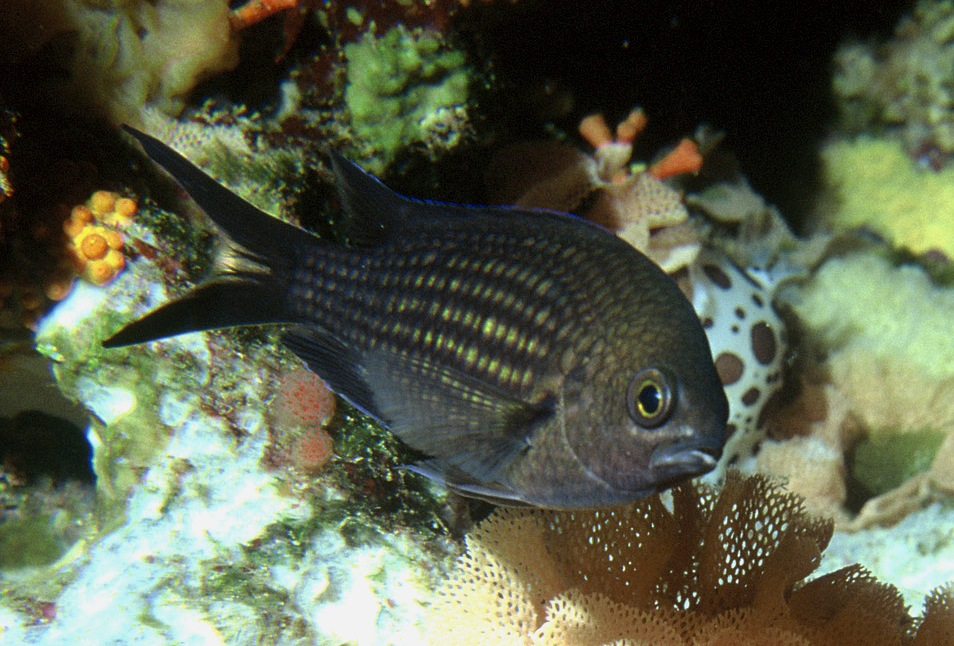
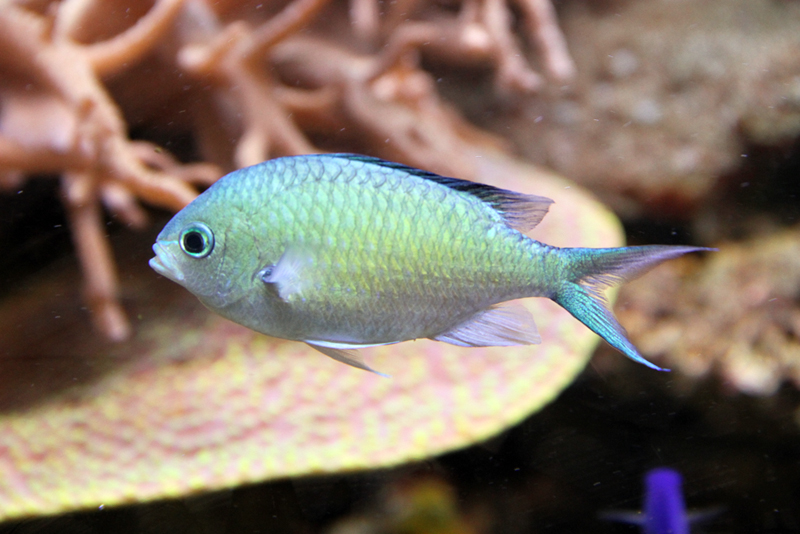
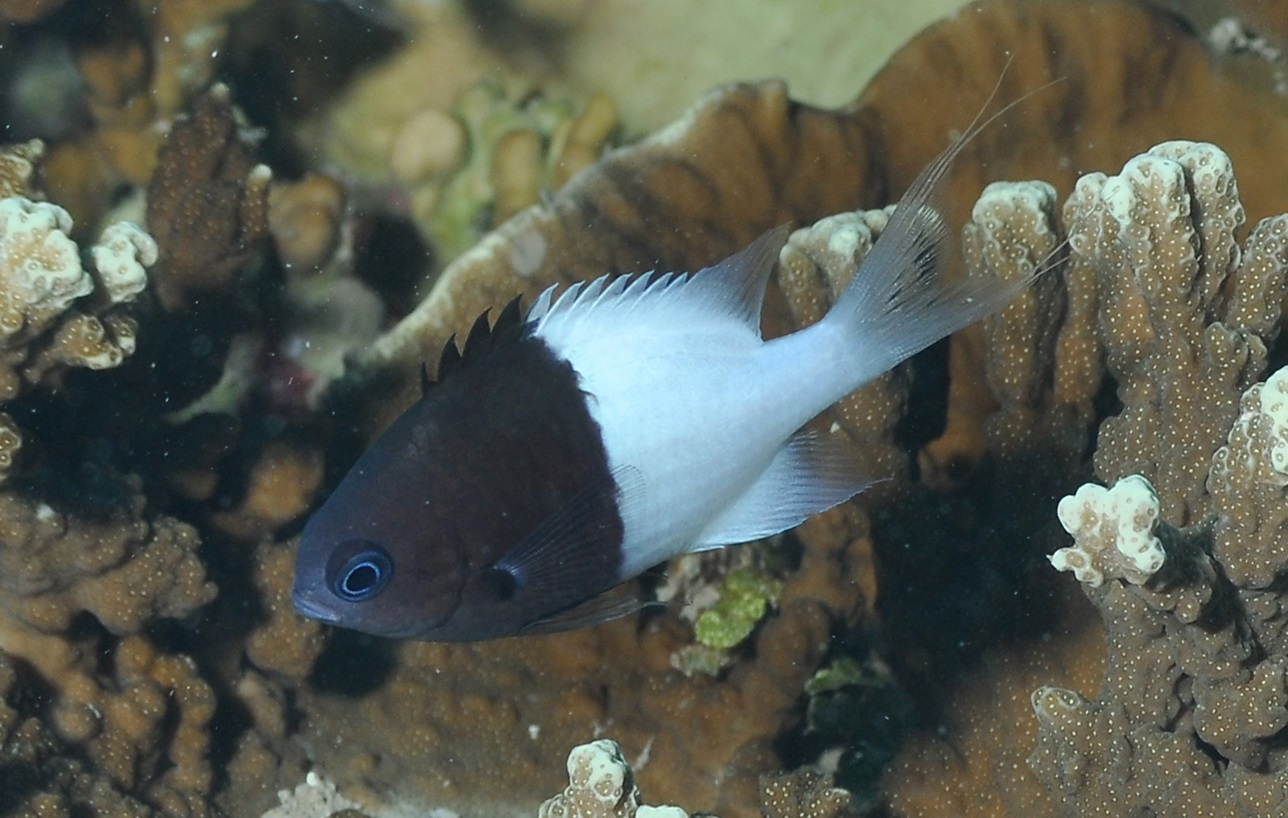
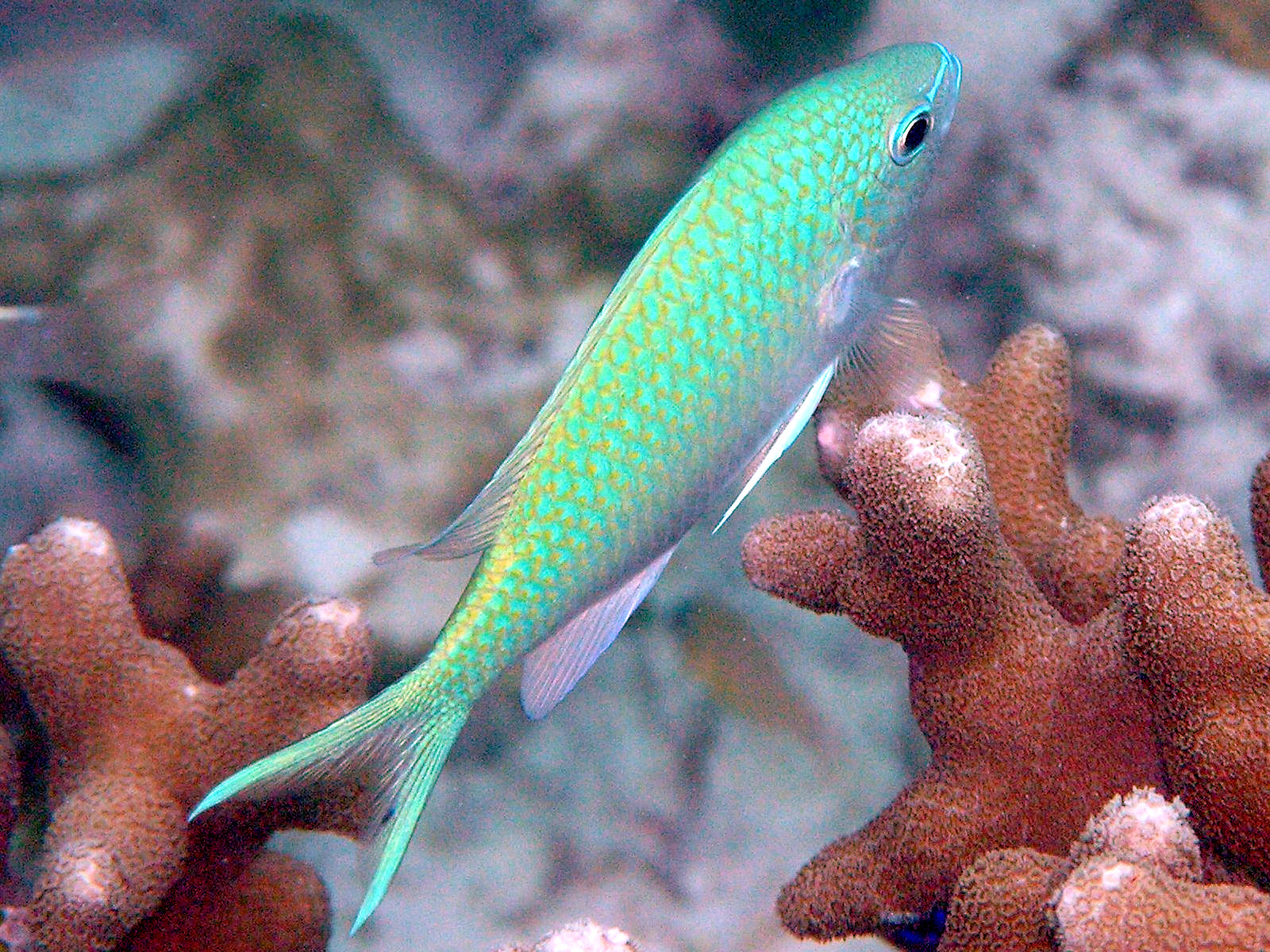
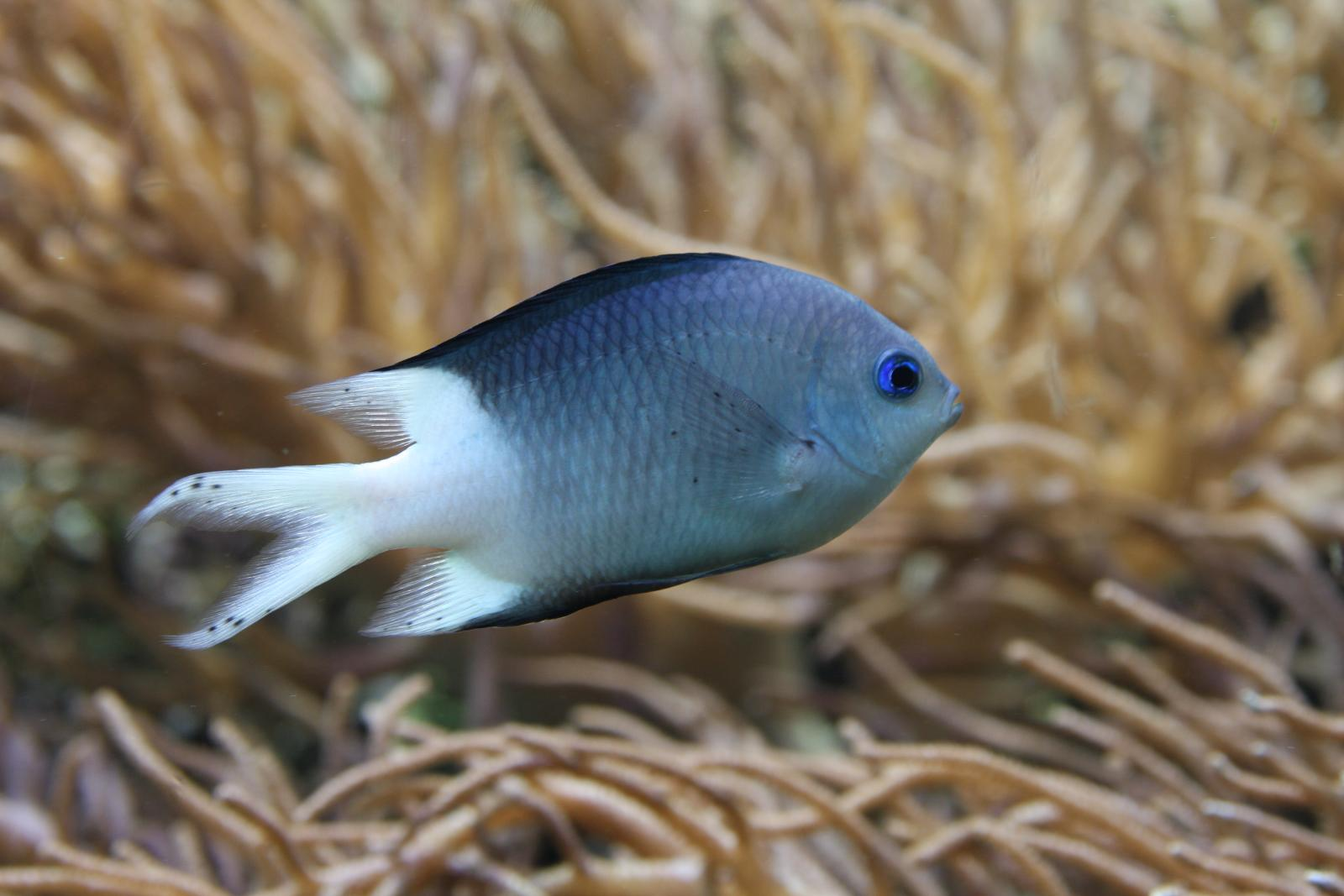
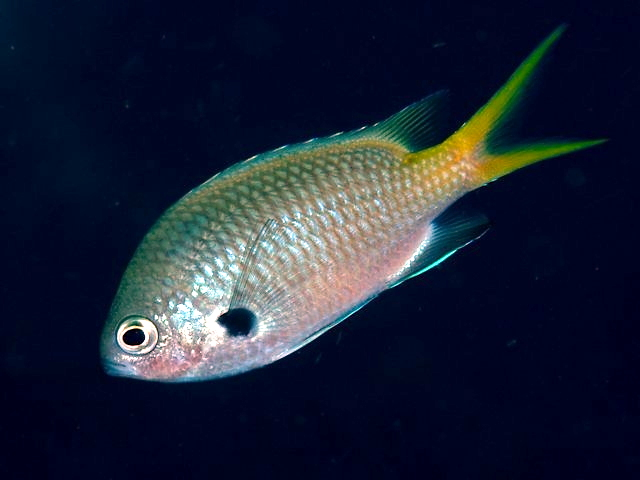
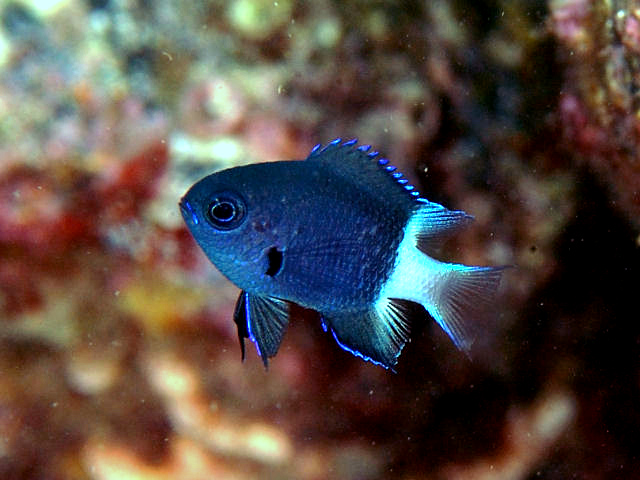
Common name	Image	Taxonomy	Reef safe	Description	Max size
Ambon chromis		Chromis amboinensis	Yes		8 cm (3.1 in)
Barrier reef chromis		Chromis nitida	Yes		10 cm (3.9 in)
Black and gold chromis		Neoglyphidodon nigroris	Yes	Mostly silver, but with a large patch of yellow around the caudal fin and a distinct black line on the operculum.	13 cm (5.1 in)
Black bar chromis		Chromis retrofasciata	Yes	Yellowish with bright blue iridescent pelvic fins and a distinct black bar at the base of the caudal fin.	5 cm (2.0 in).
Blue chromis		Chromis cyanea	Yes	Bright blue all over, although lighter toward the front.	13 cm (5.1 in)
Damselfish		Chromis chromis	Yes	Completely black. Despite the name, this is actually a chromis, in fact, it is the chromis.	25 cm (9.8 in)
Green chromis		Chromis viridis	Yes	Generally bluish green, but some specimens may be spring green.	8 cm (3.1 in)
Half and half chromis		Chromis iomelas	Yes	Completely black from the middle of the dorsal fin to the nose, completely white from the middle of the dorsal fin to the end of the caudal fin.	9 cm (3.5 in)
Limbaughi chromis		Chromis limbaughi	Yes	Dark navy blue with bright yellow spot that covers the dorsal fin and much of the posterior.	10 cm (3.9 in)
Lined chromis		Chromis lineata	Yes		5 cm (2.0 in)
Paletail chromis		Chromis xanthura	Yes		15 cm (5.9 in)
Black-axil chromis		Chromis atripectoralis	Yes		12 cm (14.7 in)
Spiny chromis		Acanthochromis polyacanthus	Yes	Dark chocolate brown, slightly lighter around the pectoral fins.	14 cm (5.5 in)
Sunshine chromis		Chromis insolatus	Yes	Rather drab tannish-orange throughout.	16 cm (6.3 in)
Yellowspotted chromis		Chromis flavomaculata	Yes		15 cm (5.9 in)
Black and white chromis		Chromis margaritifer	Yes	Similar to half and half chromis, but there is more black.	3 in (7.6 cm)

== Clownfish ==
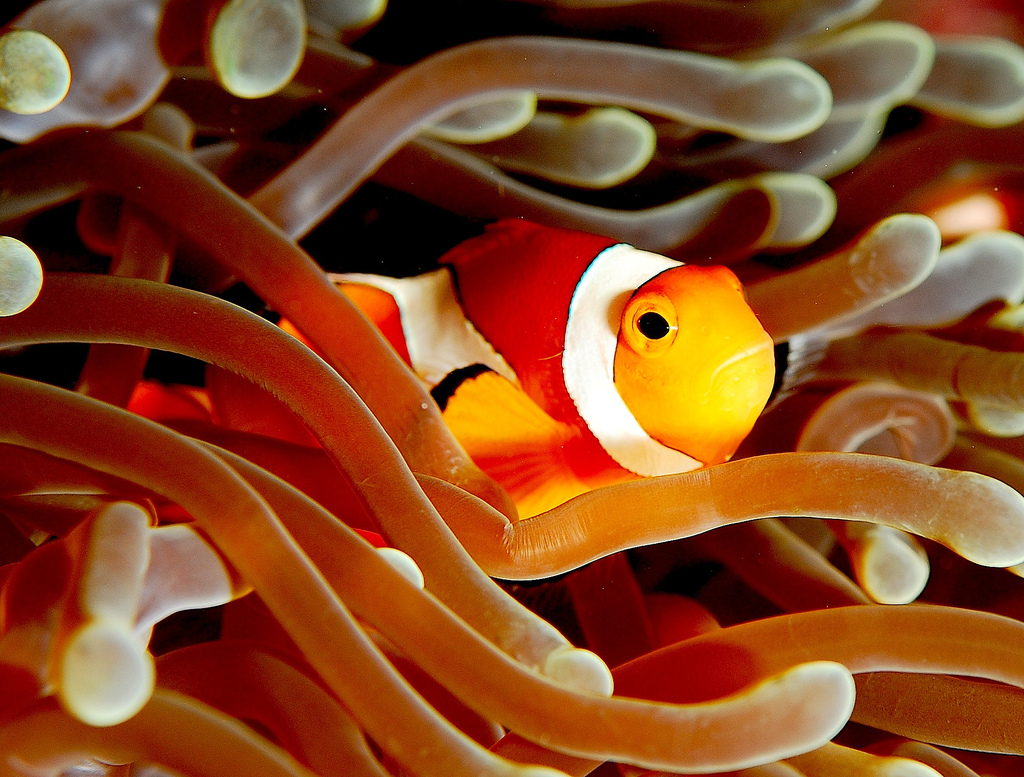
False percula clownfish

Clownfish, more technically known as Anemonefish, are the classic aquarium fish. Both hardy and attractive, they are perhaps best known for their symbiotic relationship with Sea Anemones, a relative of coral. In the wild, anemonefish are always found with a host, leading many potential keepers to believe that an anemone is necessary to keep them. Anemonefish are easy to keep, but their cnidarian counterparts are inordinately finicky and need high light levels, and luckily anemonefish will thrive without them. Aquarists often find that anemonefish will host in other things, from corals and feather duster worms to powerheads and other equipment. Anemonefish care is identical to that of damselfish, as they are actually very closely related.

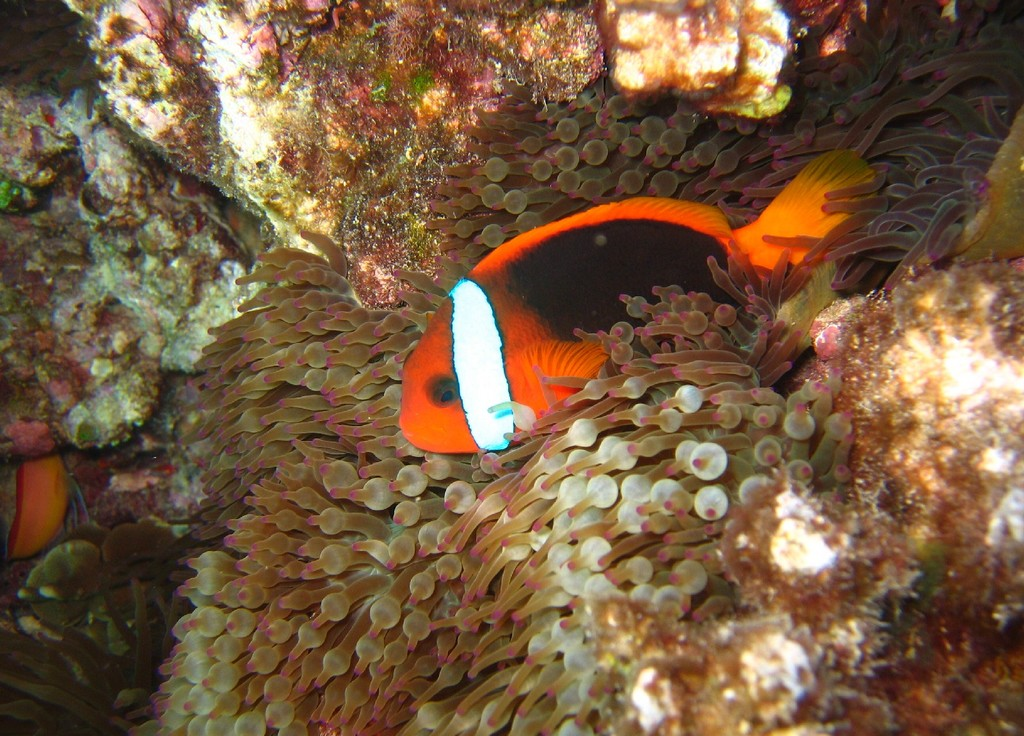
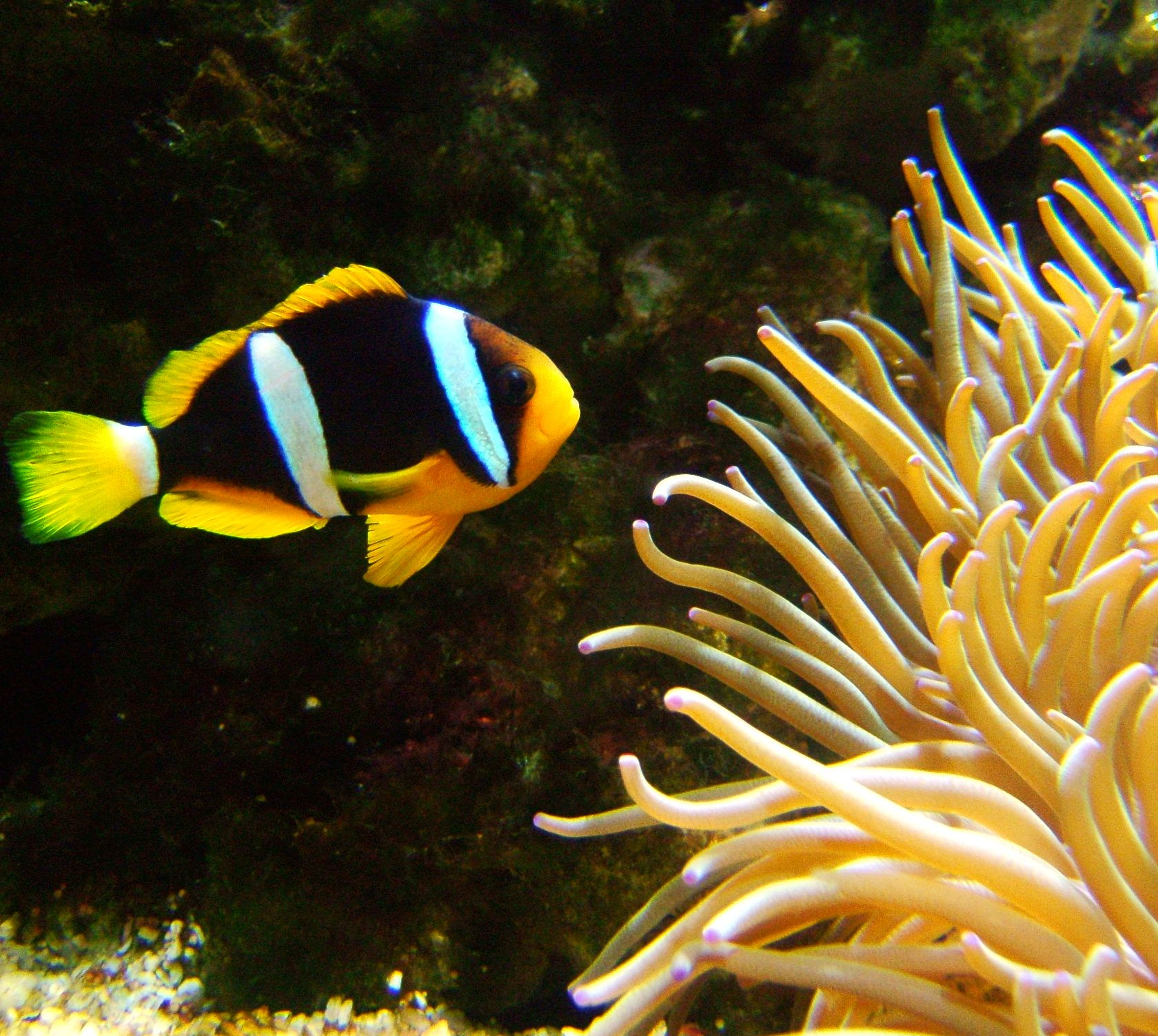
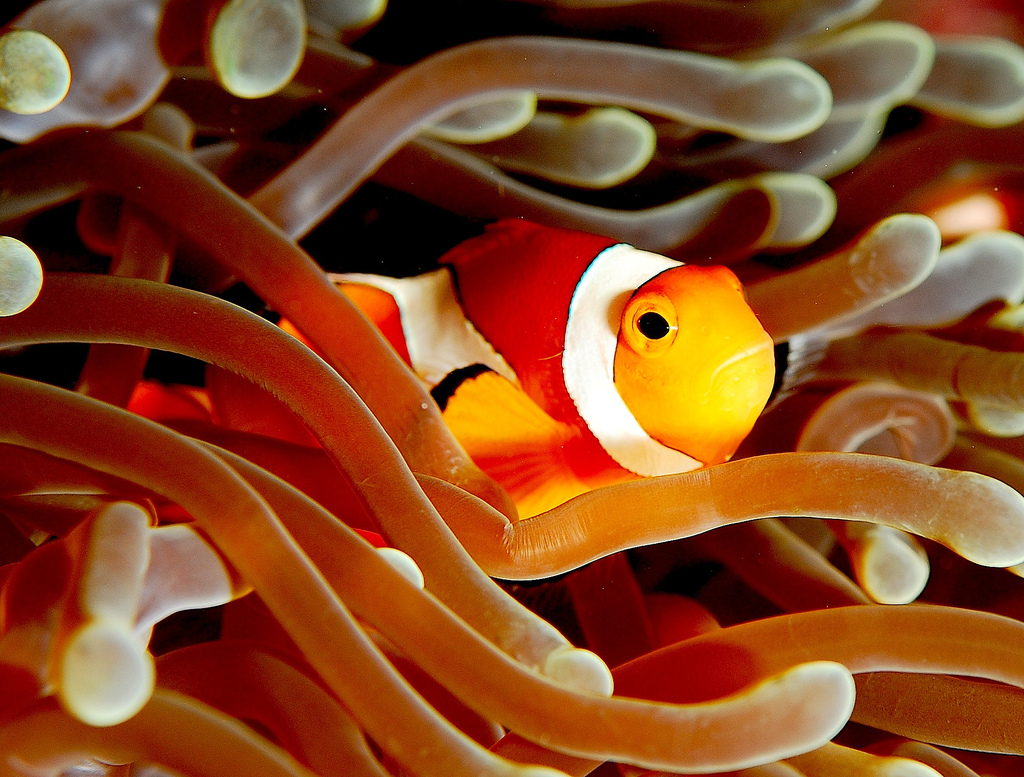
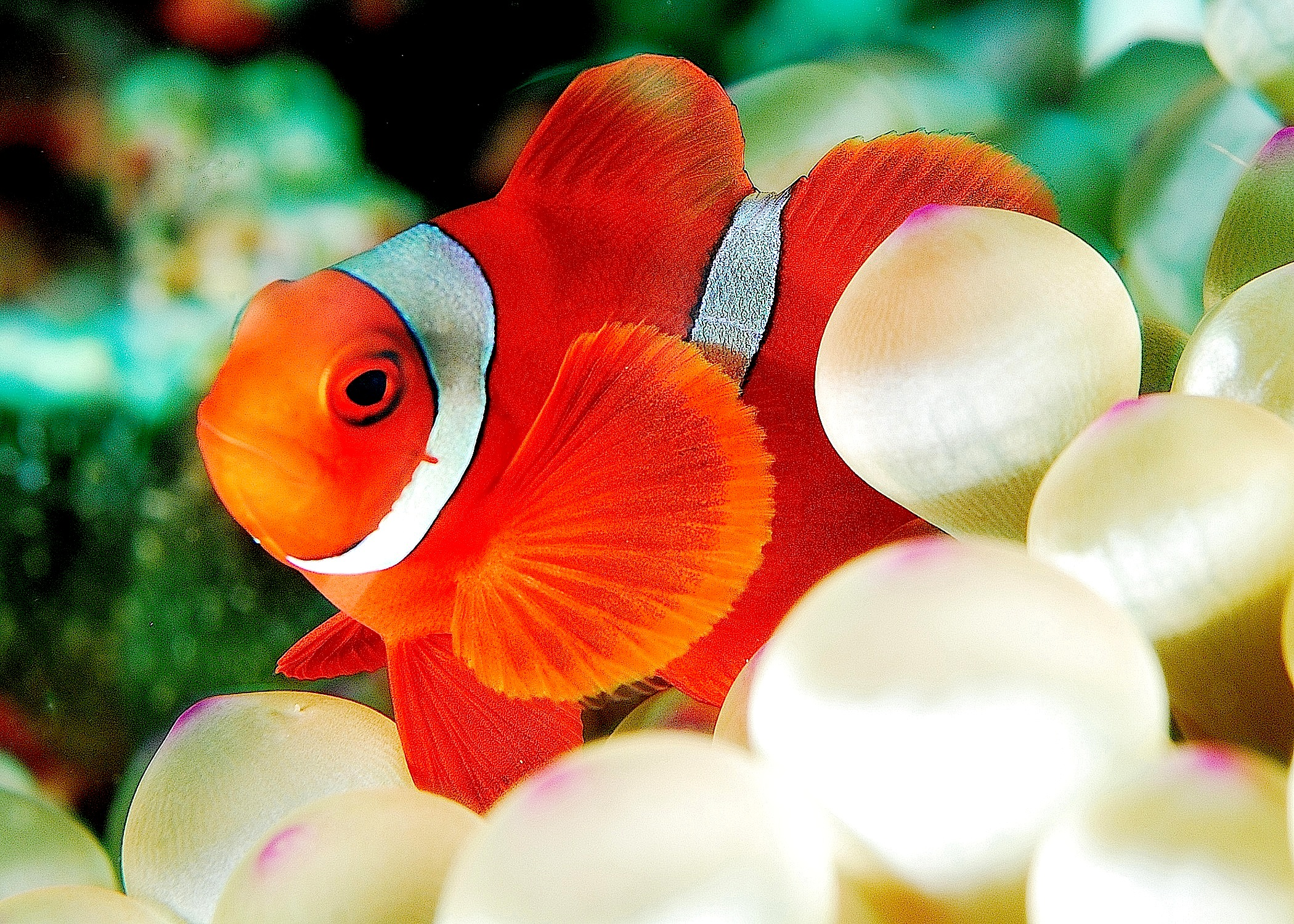
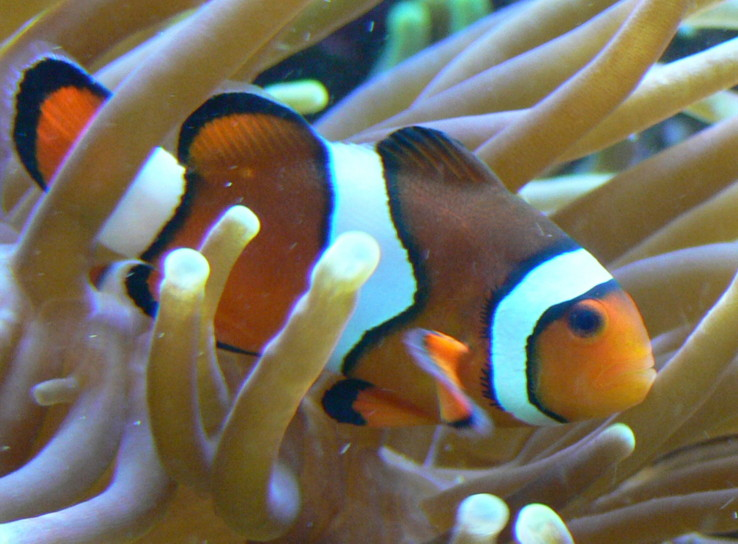
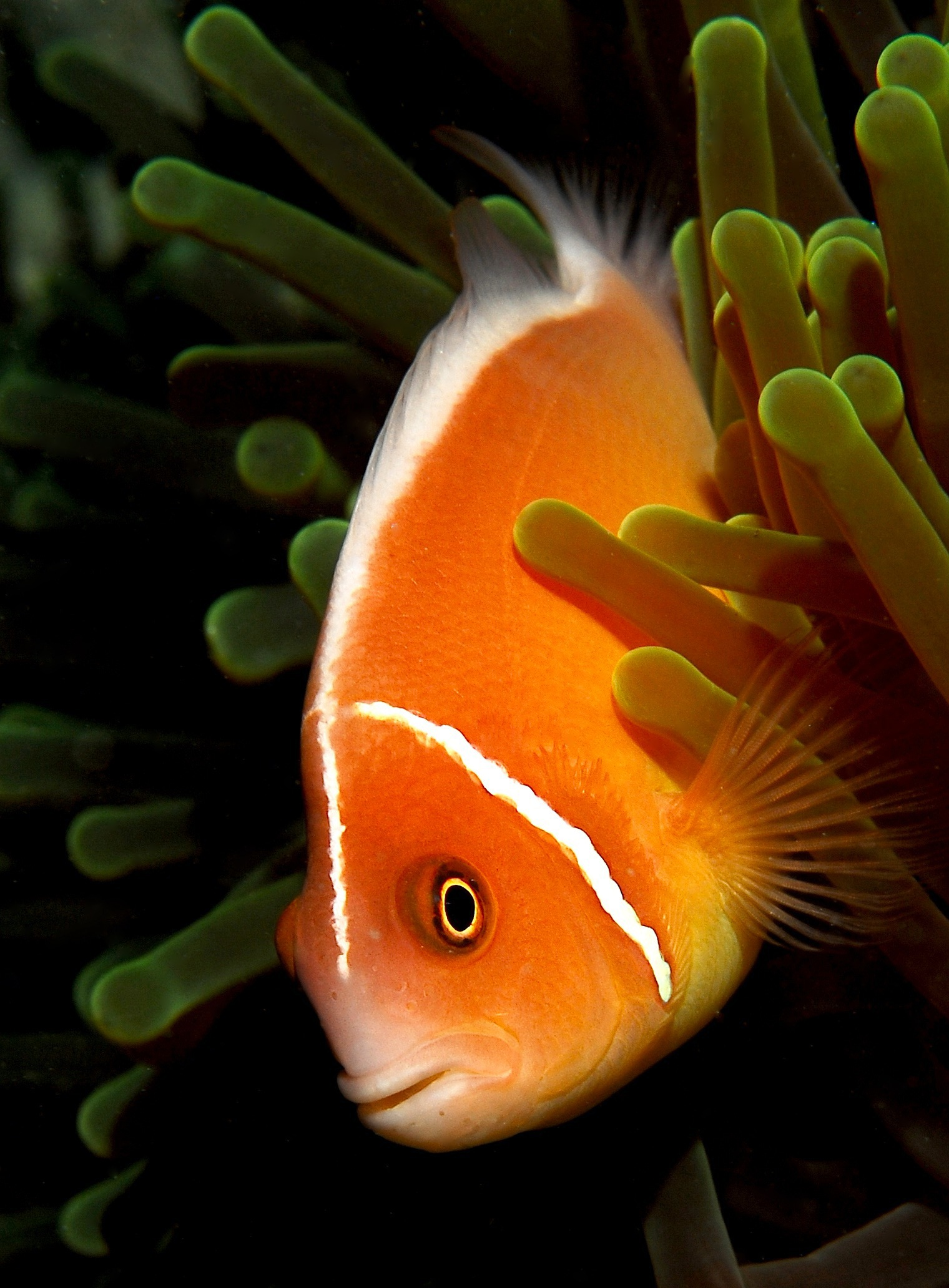
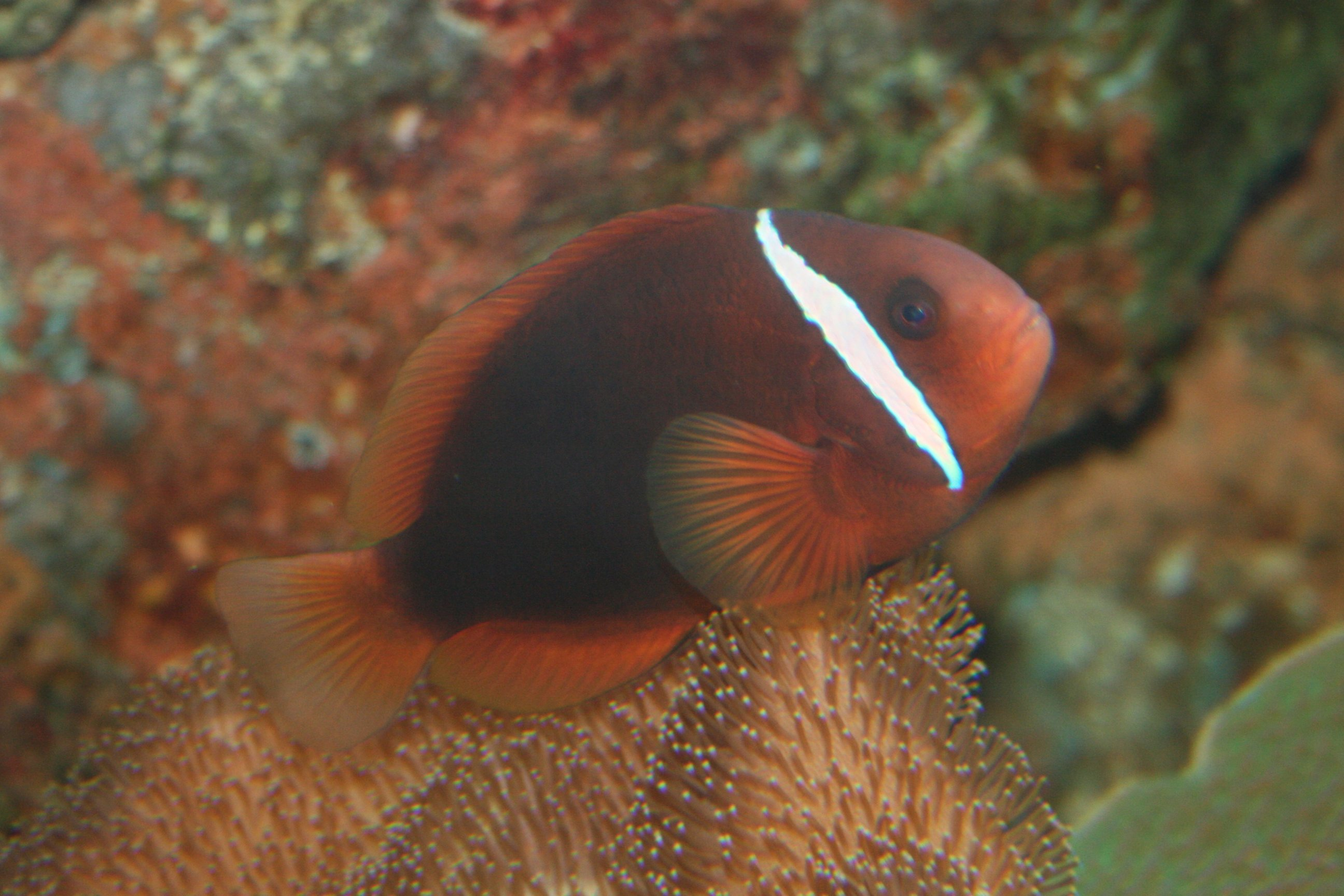
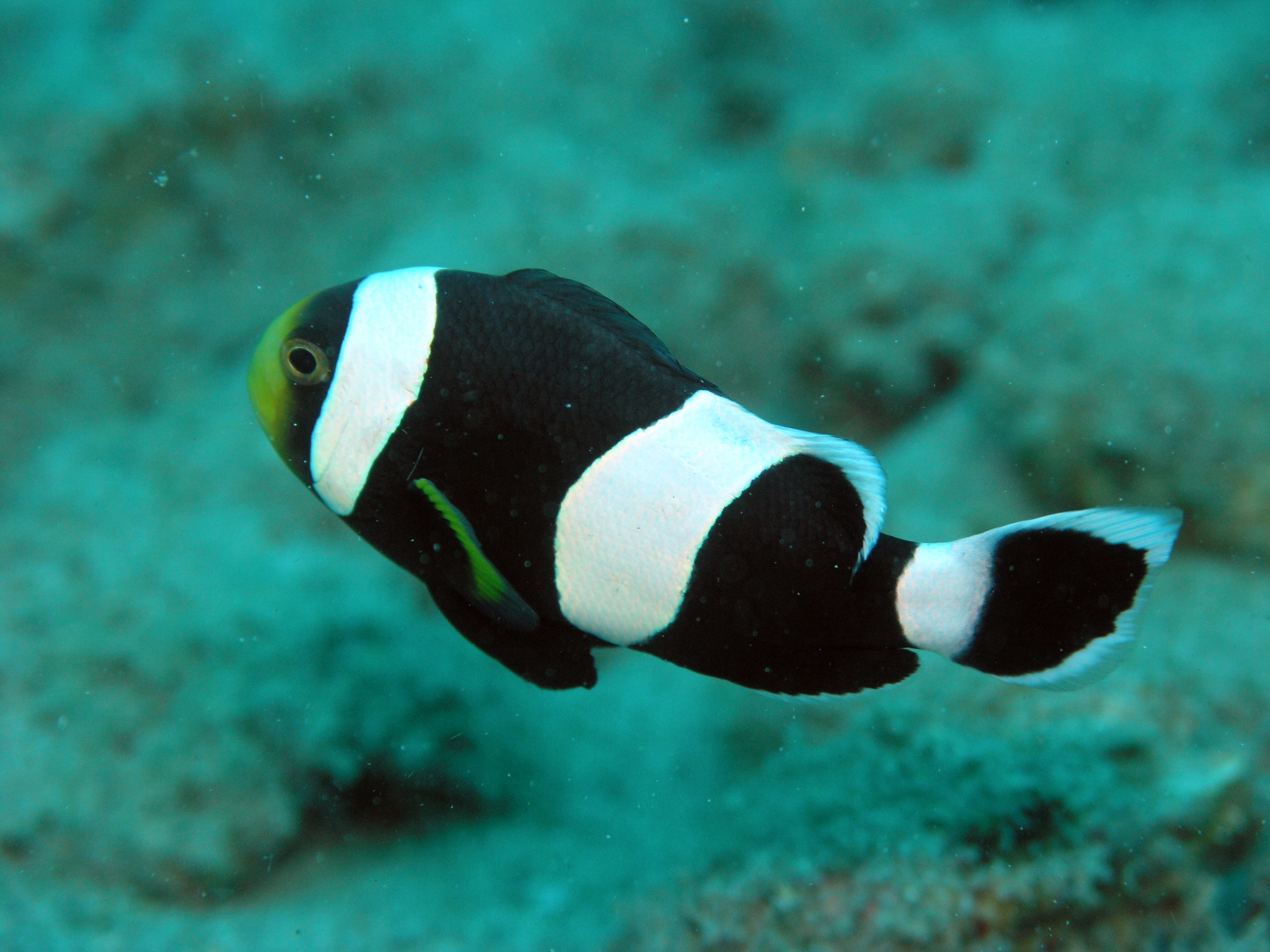
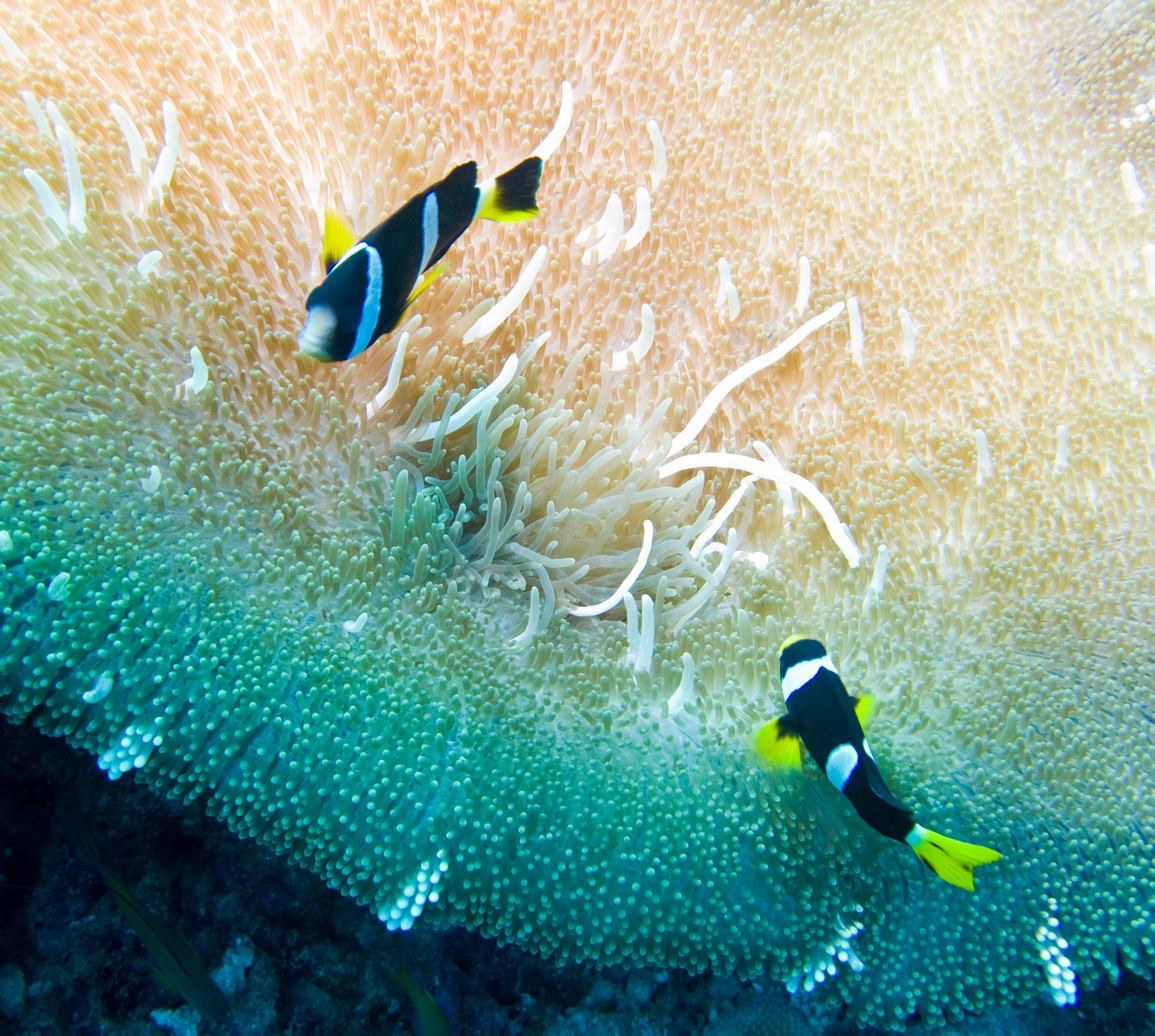
Common name	Image	Taxonomy	Reef safe	Description	Max size
Cinnamon anemonefish		Amphiprion melanopus	Yes	Dark orange body becoming black towards the caudal fin, with a bright white stripe running from the front of the dorsal fin to the pectoral fins and golden colored fins.	12 cm (4.7 in)
Clarkii anemonefish		Amphiprion clarkii	Yes	Black or dark brown with bright yellow finnage and two thick white stripes running perpendicular to the body.	15 cm (5.9 in)
Ocellaris		Amphiprion ocellaris	Yes	Bright orange or yellow body with white stripes. Fins are orange, rimmed with black. A. ocellaris from northern Australia are black.	11 cm (4.3 in)
Maroon clownfish		Premnas biaculeatus	Yes but aggressive	Maroon to bright red with three very thin white stripes.	17 cm (6.7 in)
True Percula		Amphiprion percula	Yes	Nearly identical to A. ocellaris, but the white stripes are edged with black.	11 cm (4.3 in)
Pink skunk anemonefish		Amphiprion perideraion	Yes	Pink to orange body with one white stripe over the operculum and another running from the tip of the snout, along the back to the dorsal fin. All fins are white.	10 cm (3.9 in)
Tomato clownfish		Amphiprion frenatus	Yes	Bright red with a single white stripe running from the front of the dorsal fin to the bottom of the head.	14 cm (5.5 in)
Saddleback anemonefish		Amphiprion polymnus	Yes	Similar to A. ocellaris and percula, but the second stripe does not extend the full with of the body and instead resembles a saddle.	13 cm (5.1 in)
Sebae anemonefish		Amphiprion sebae	Yes	Black or dark brown body from above the pectoral fin, yellow below. Has two white stripes, the second resembling that of A. polymnus.	16 cm (6.3 in)

== Damselfish ==
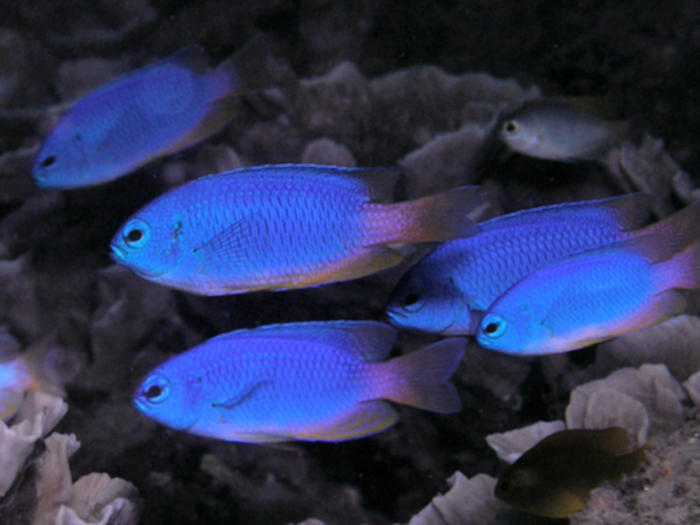
Blue and gold damsel

All damselfish can be considered reef-safe, sometimes excluding larger, more aggressive Dascyllus varieties. Some damselfish will host in sea anemones like clownfish. Most damselfish are aggressive and difficult to catch once you put them in an aquarium.

Damselfish change gender as they grow larger and older. Small damselfish are ungendered. Eventually, they become males if no males prevent them from doing so. One or sometimes two males live with a female and guard over the eggs. Females are the largest fish and dominant over the males and juveniles. They will not allow other females into an area they have claimed as their territory without a fight. They may not allow new males or juveniles, either. Aggression increases with each change.

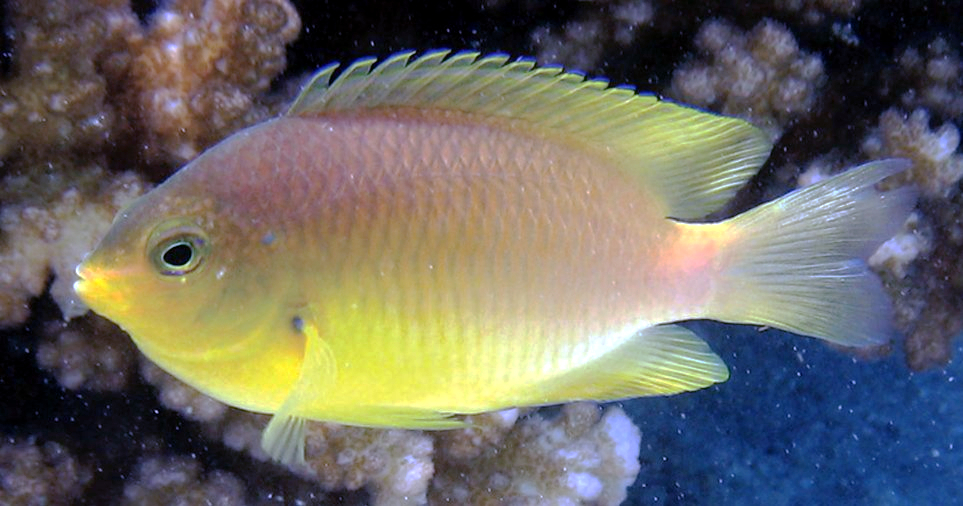
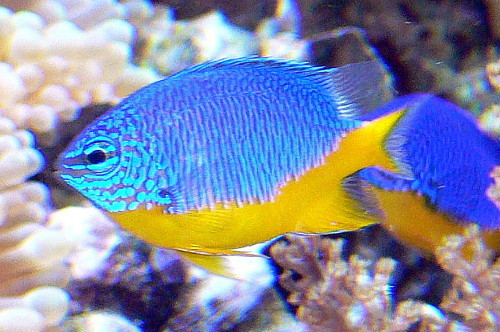
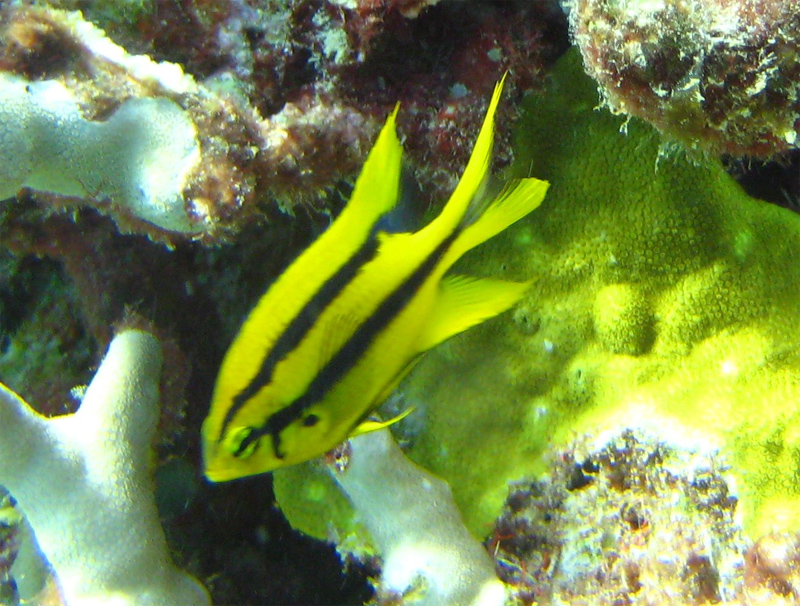
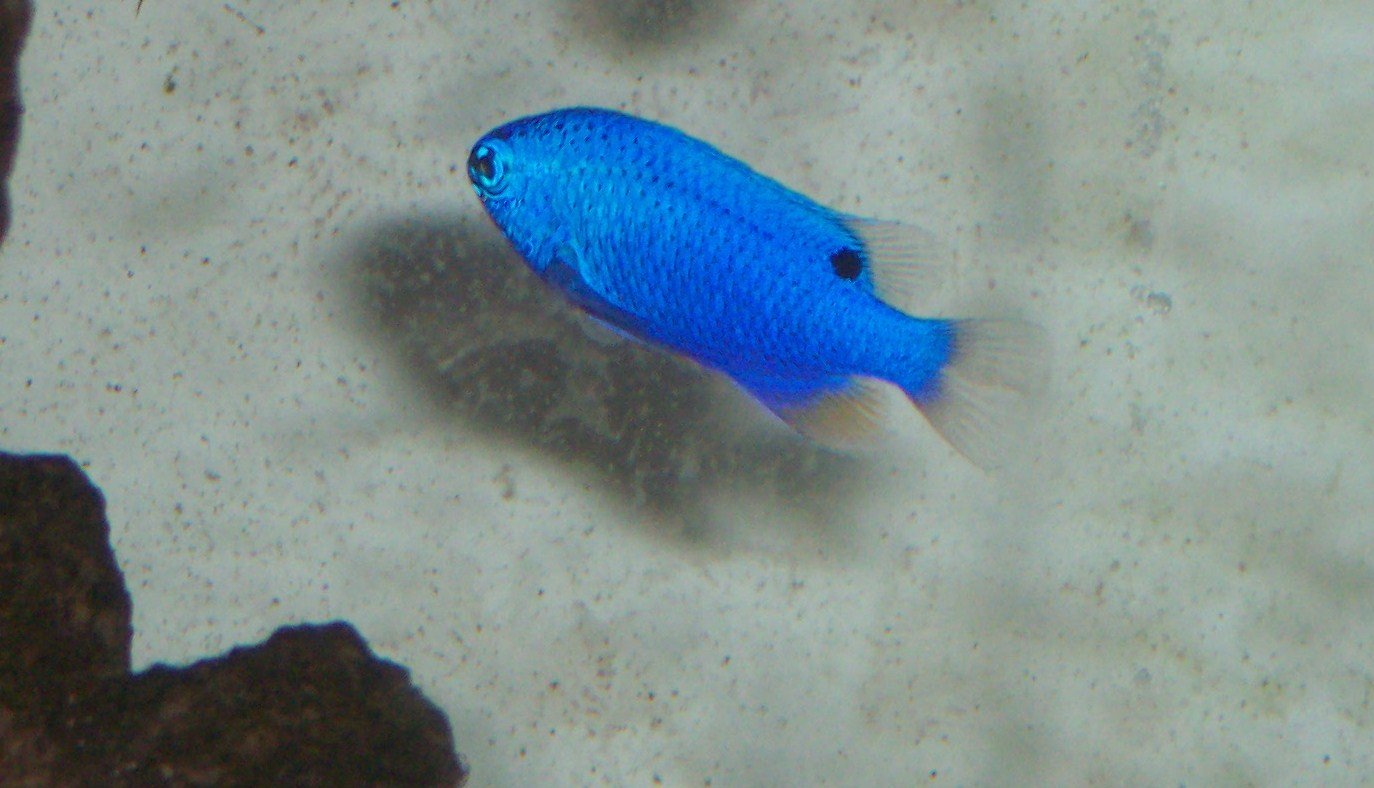
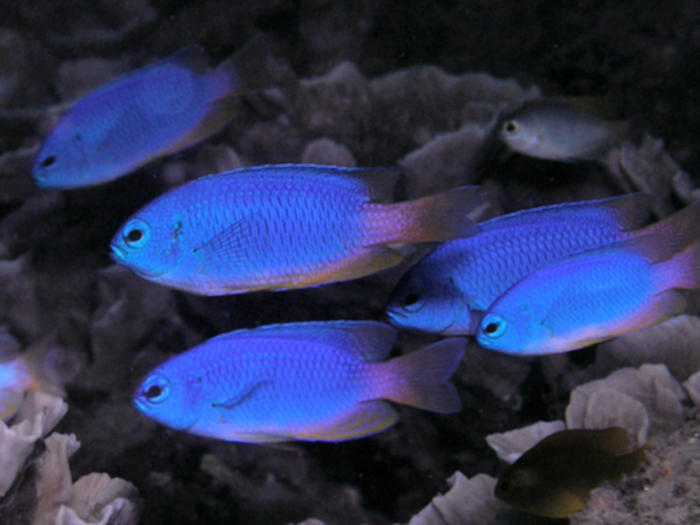
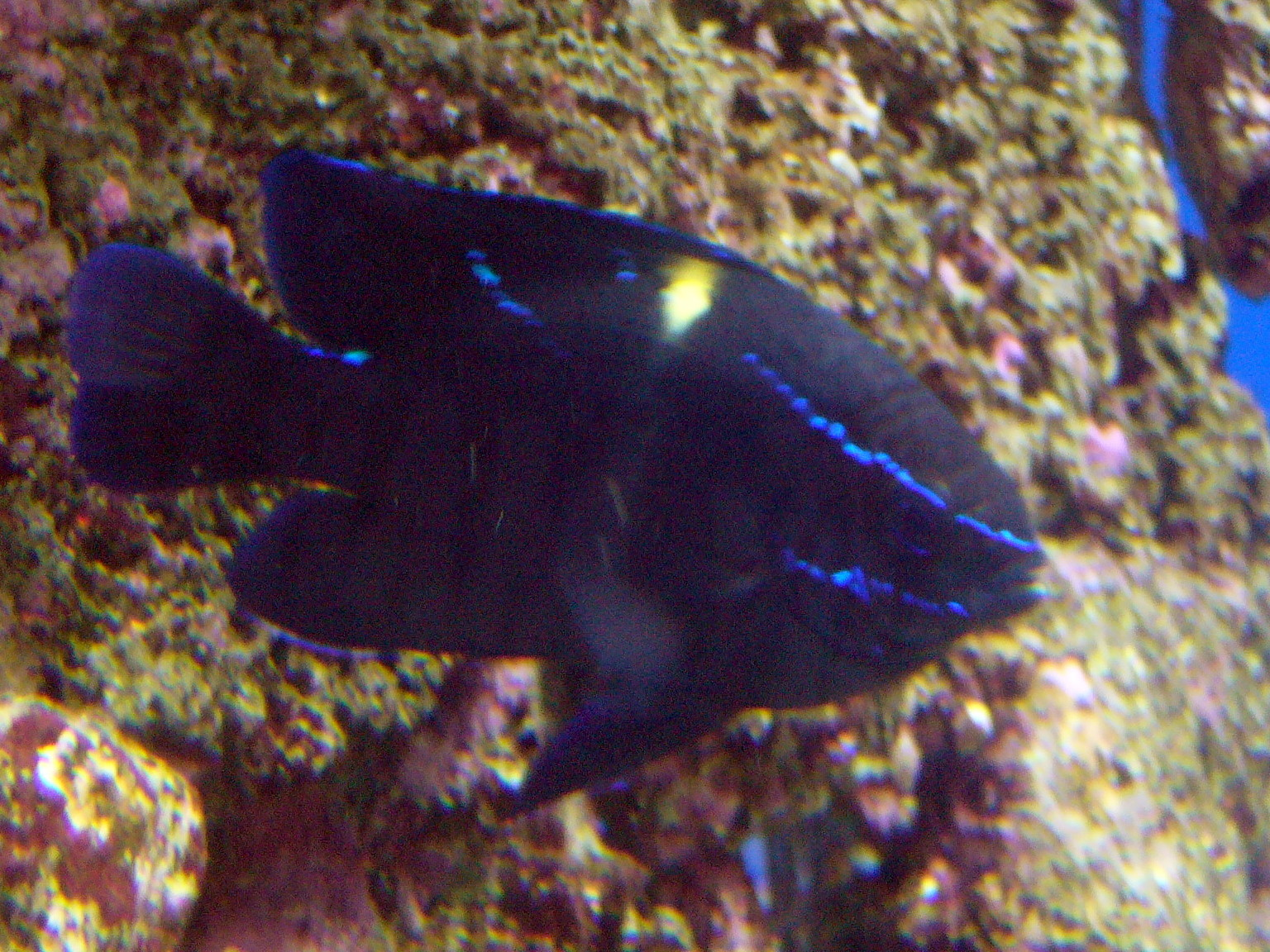
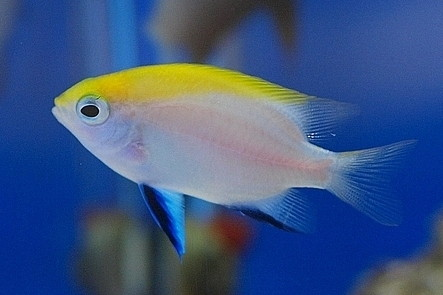
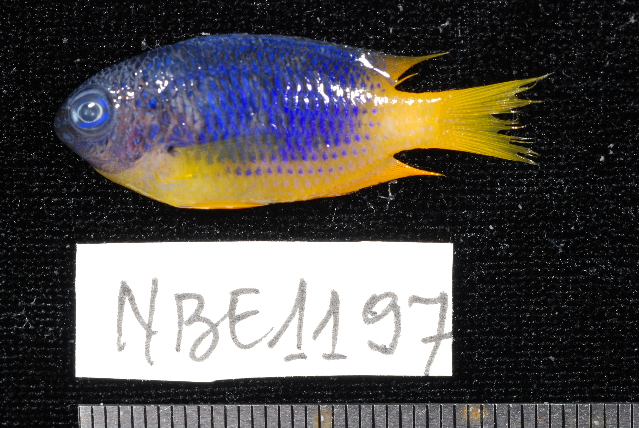
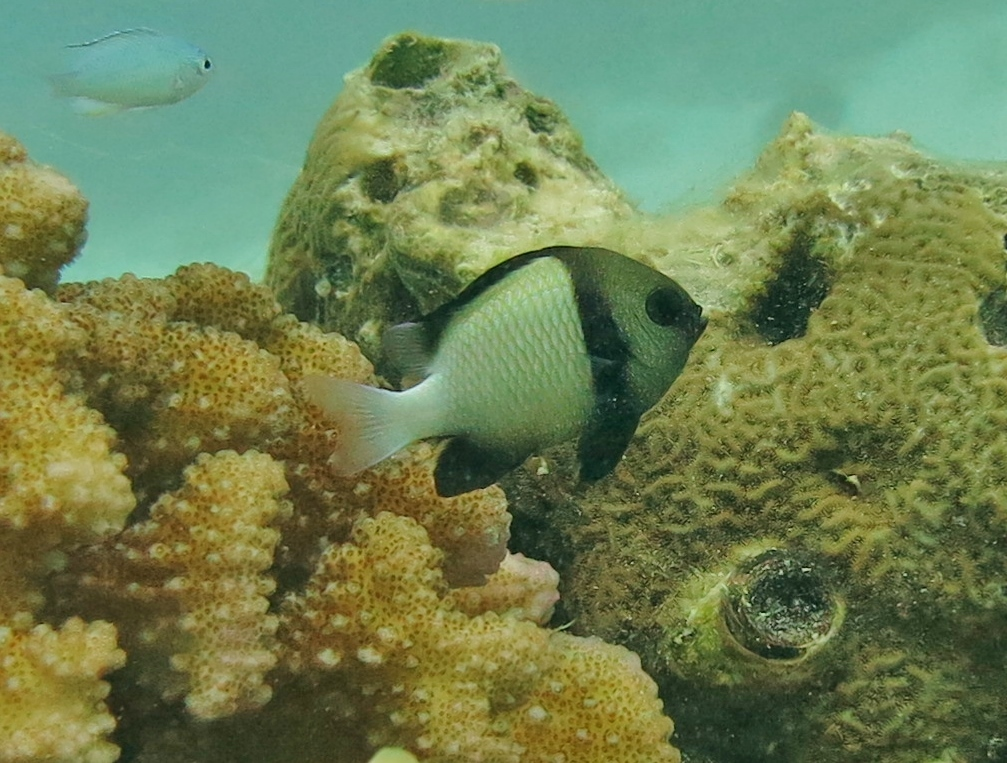
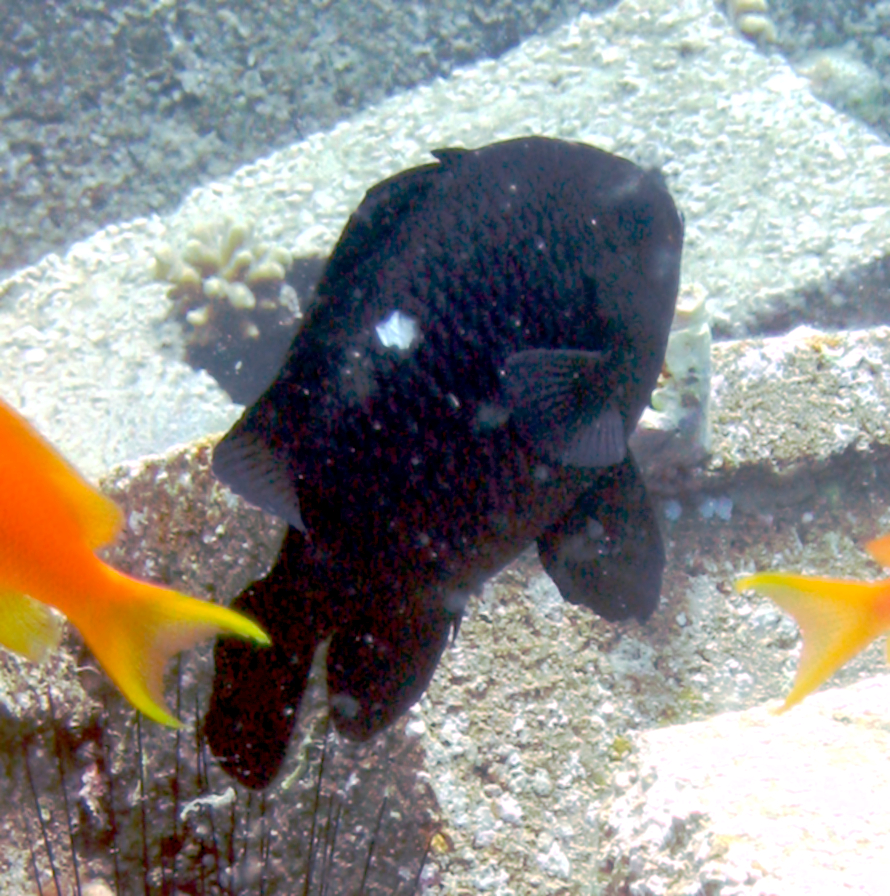
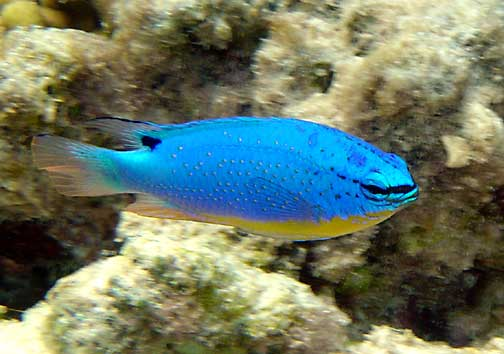
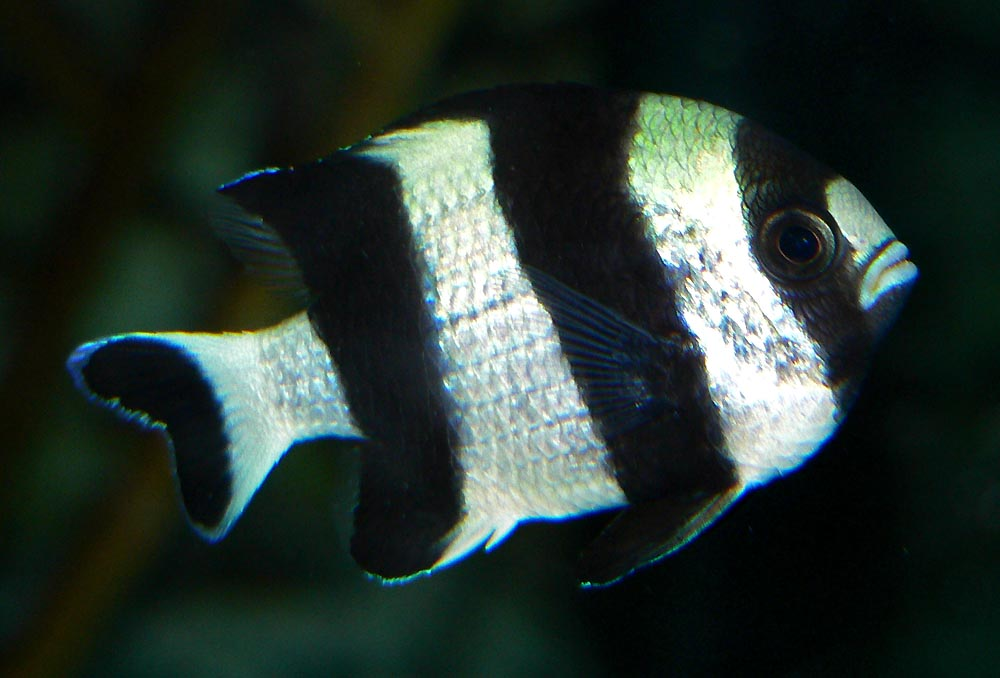
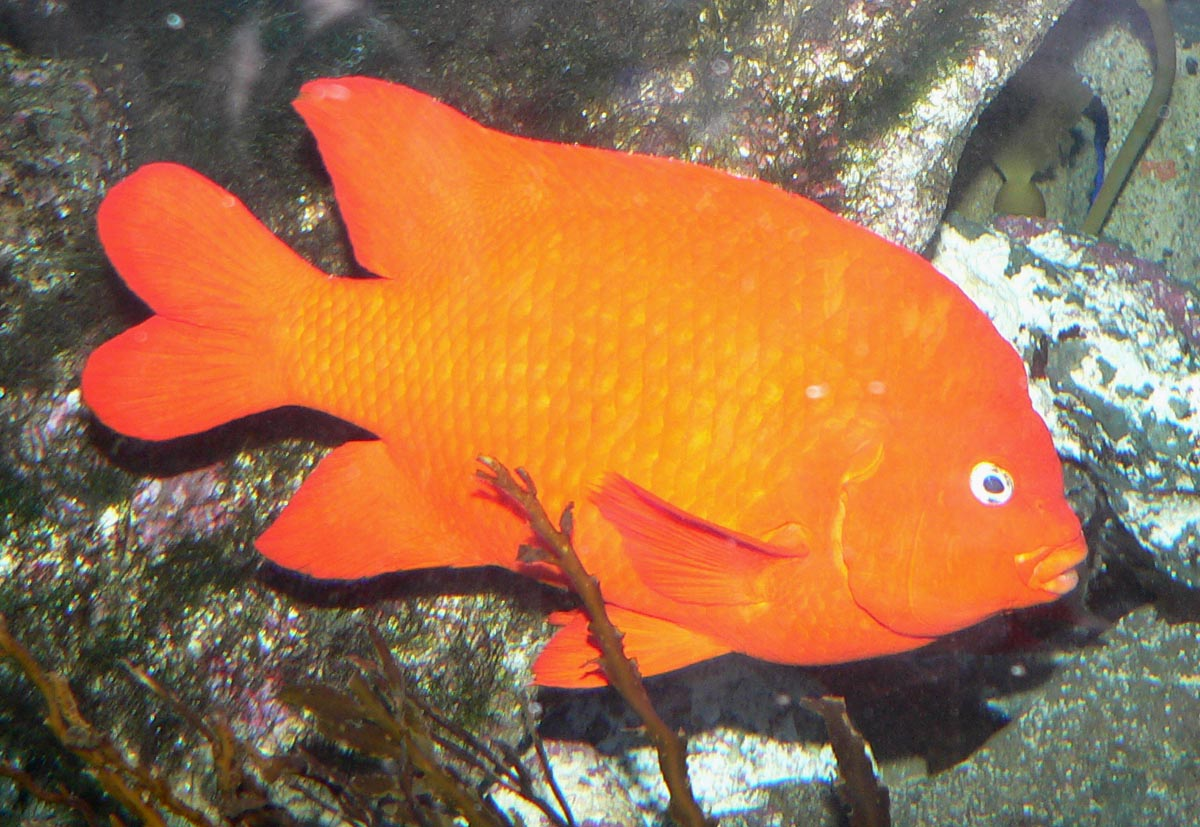
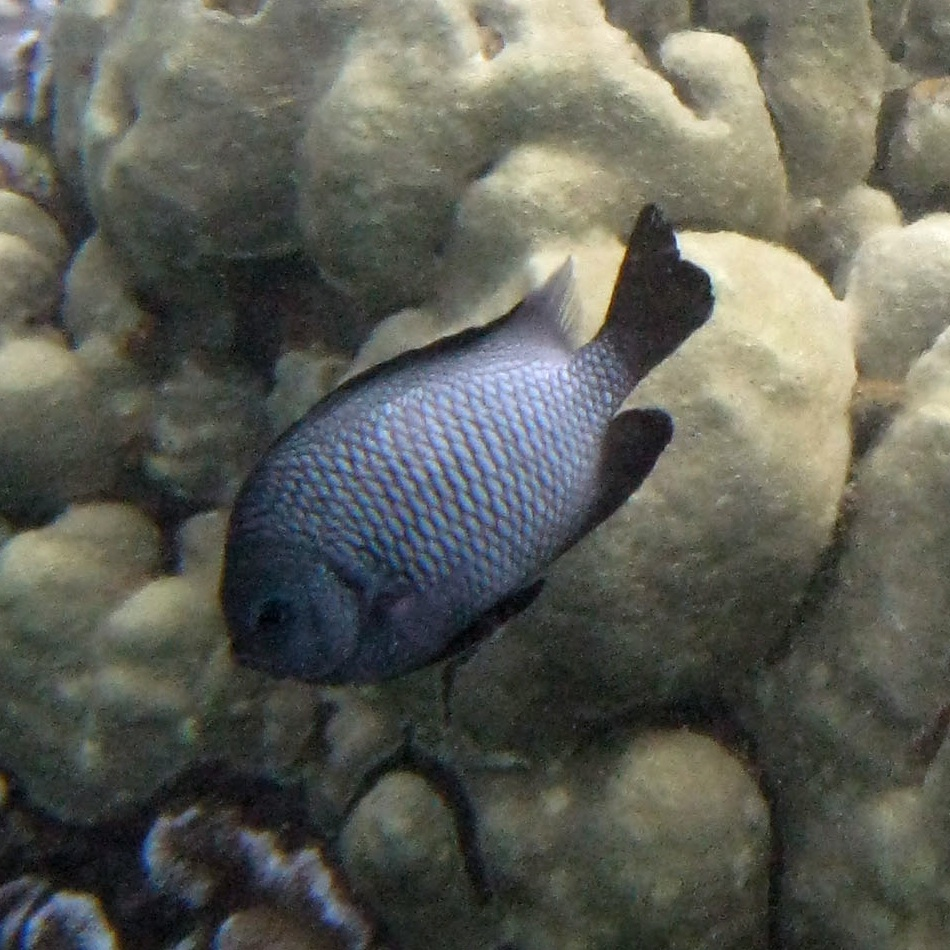
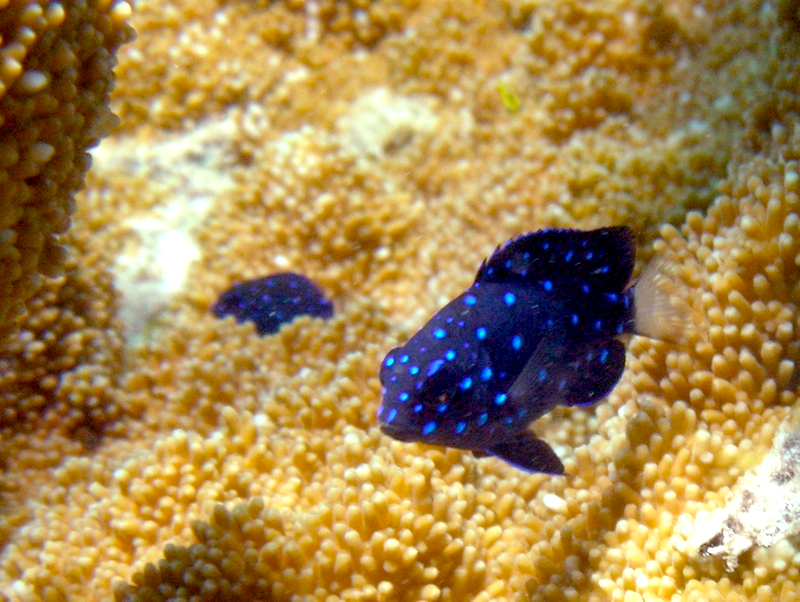
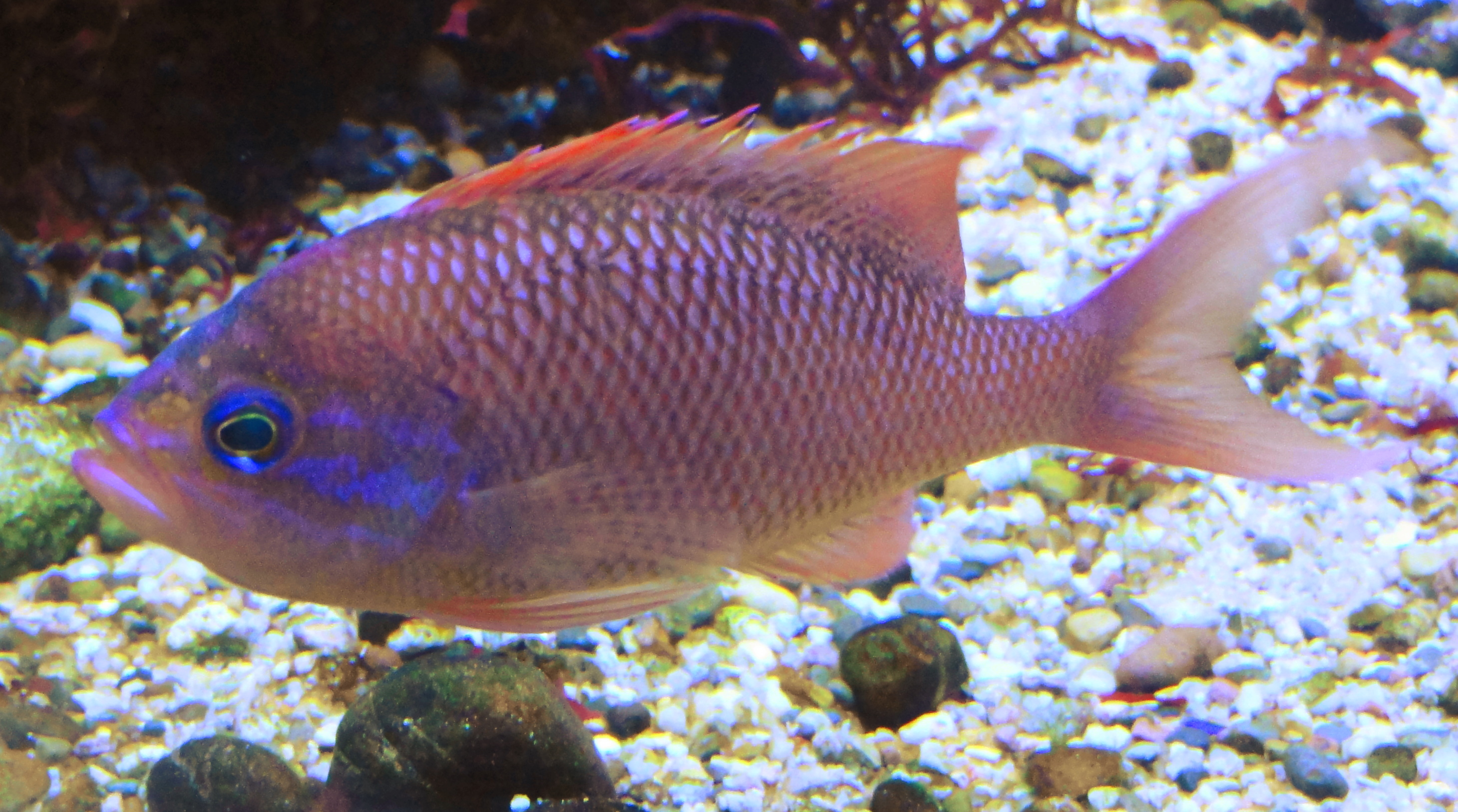
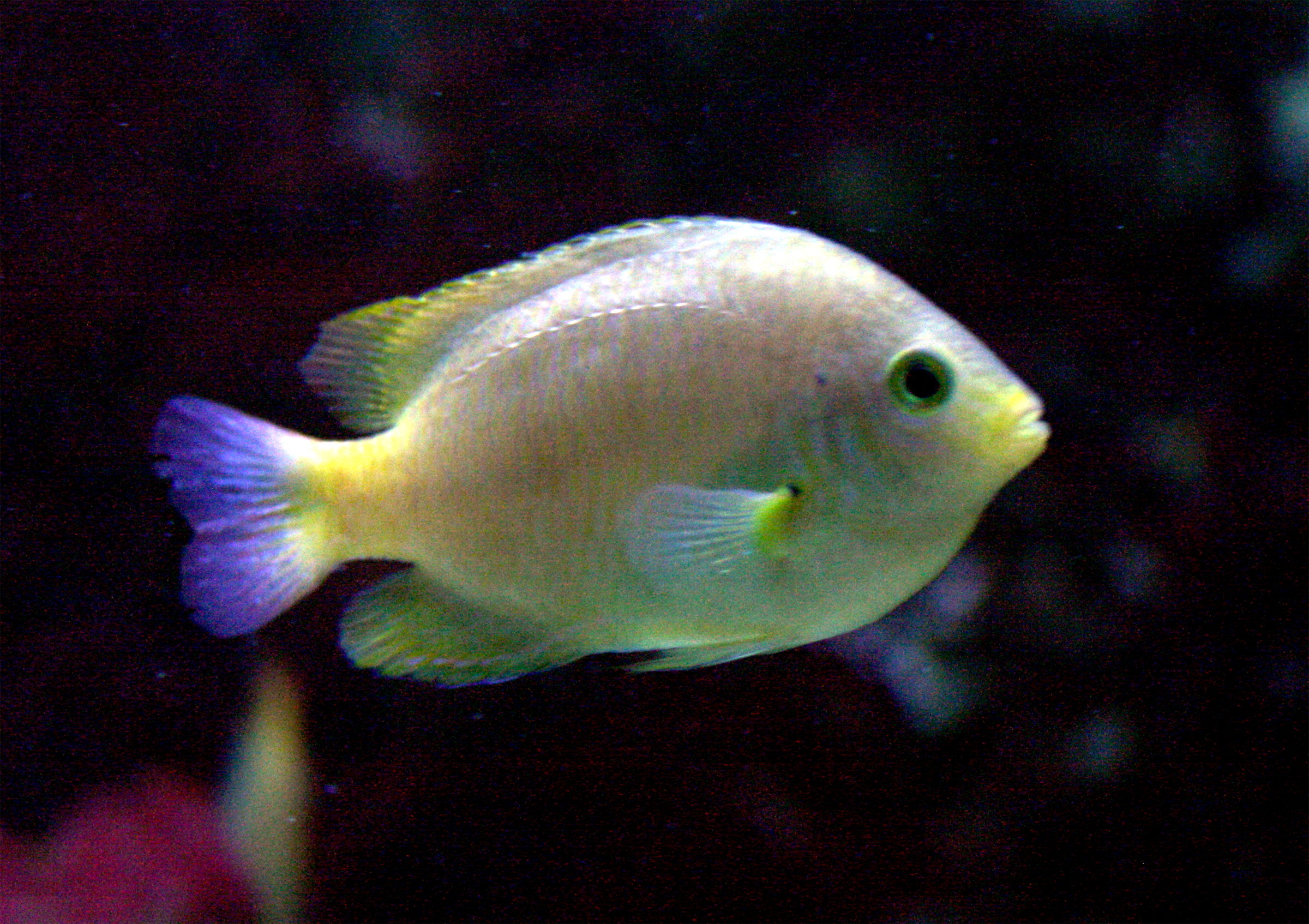
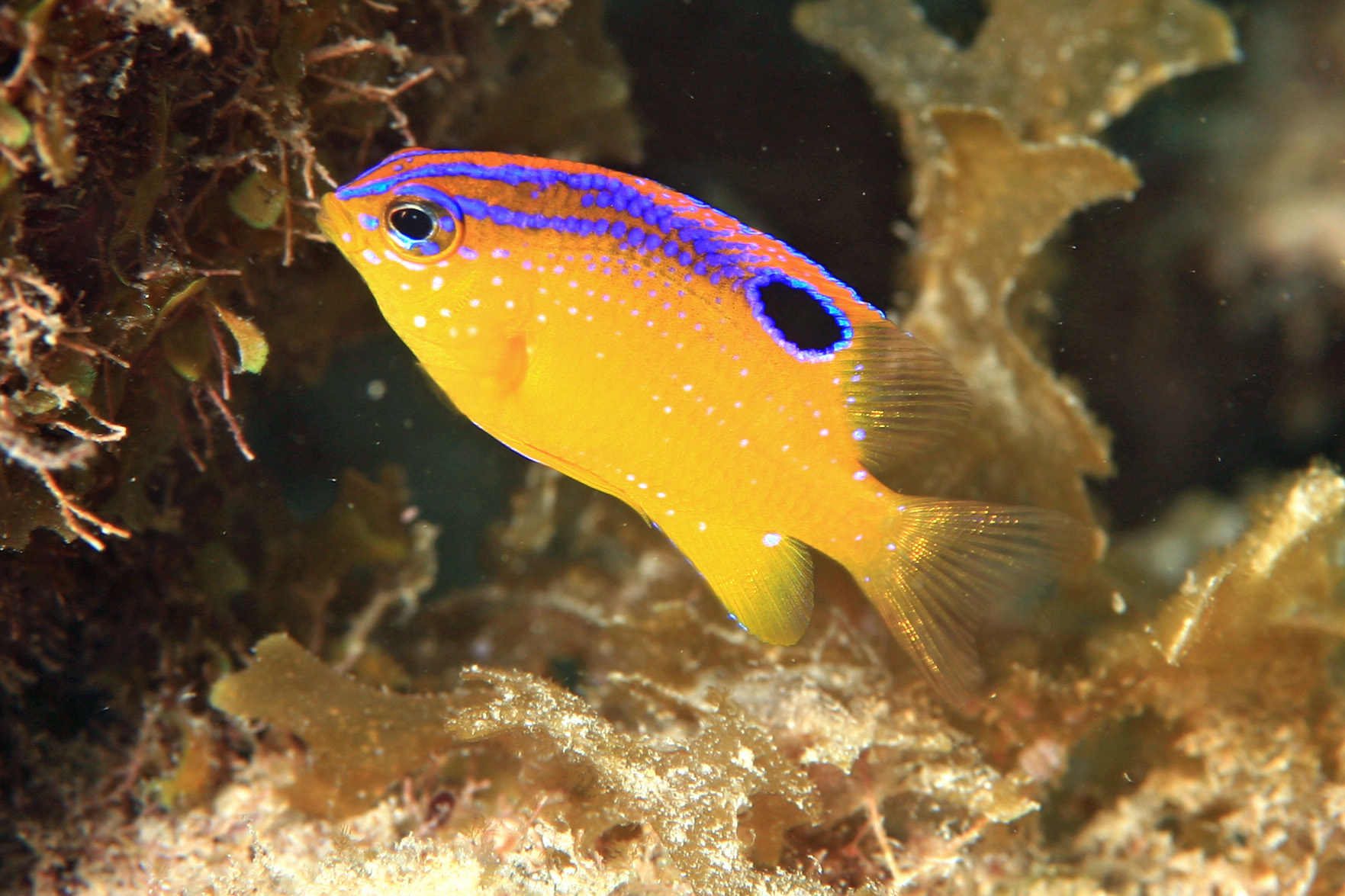
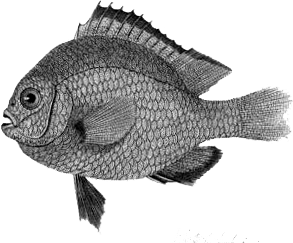
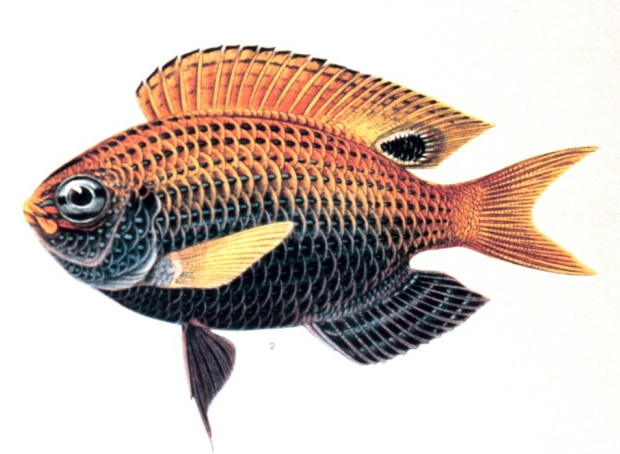
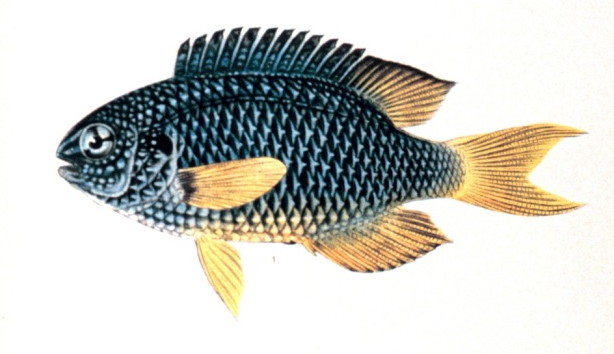
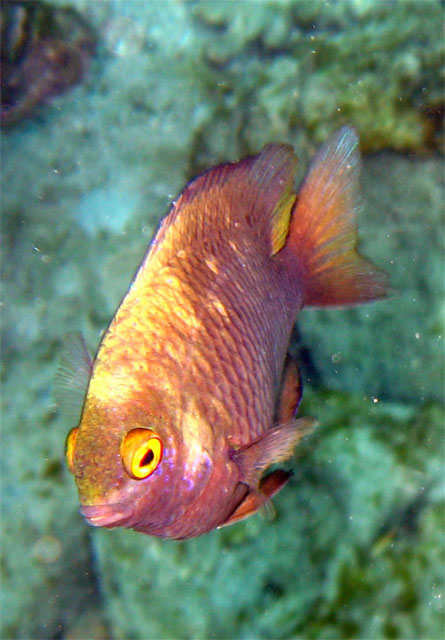
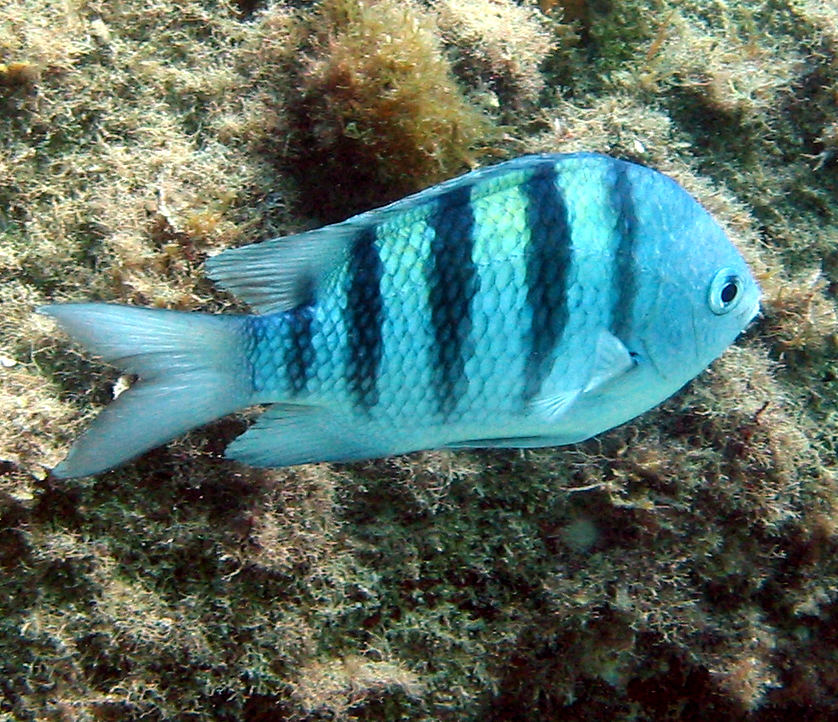
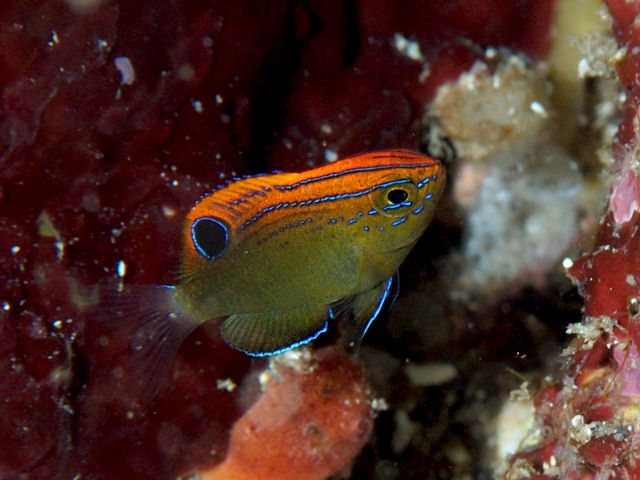
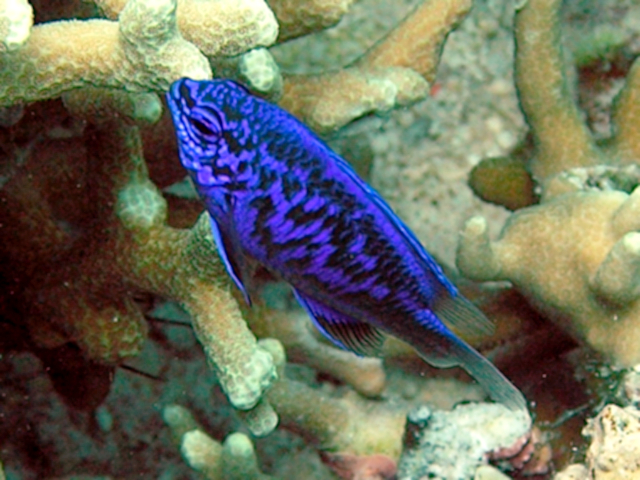
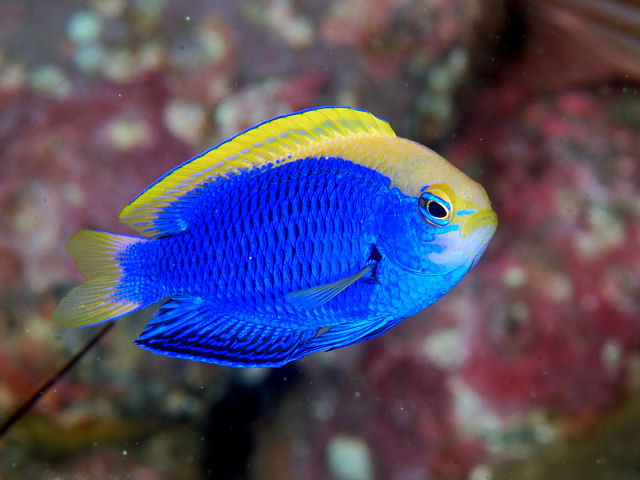
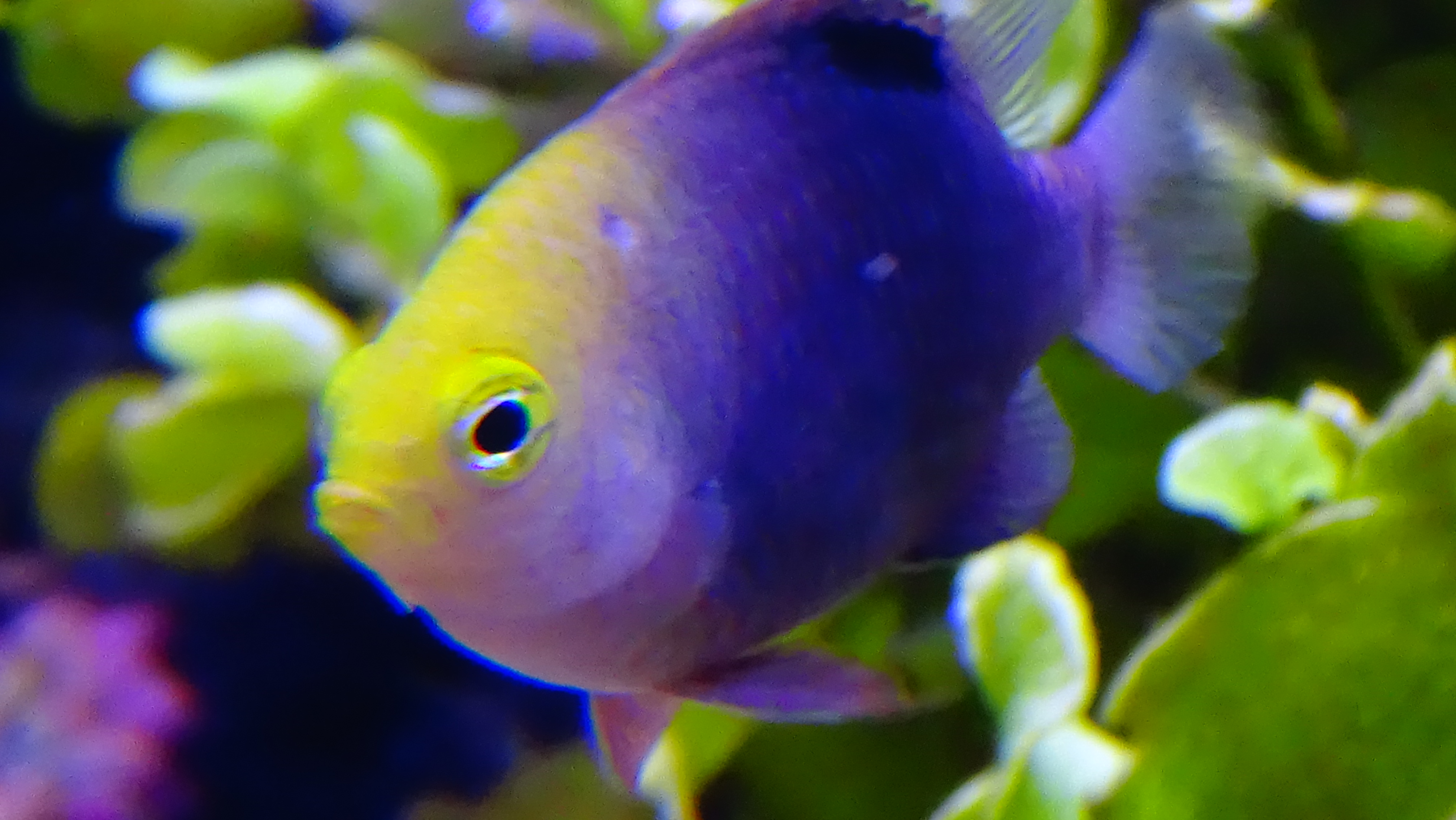
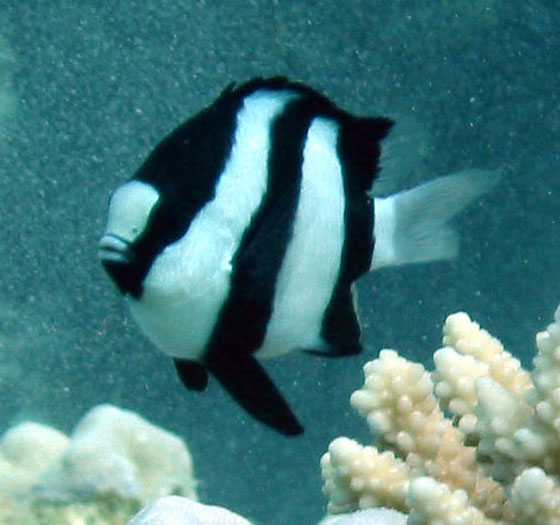
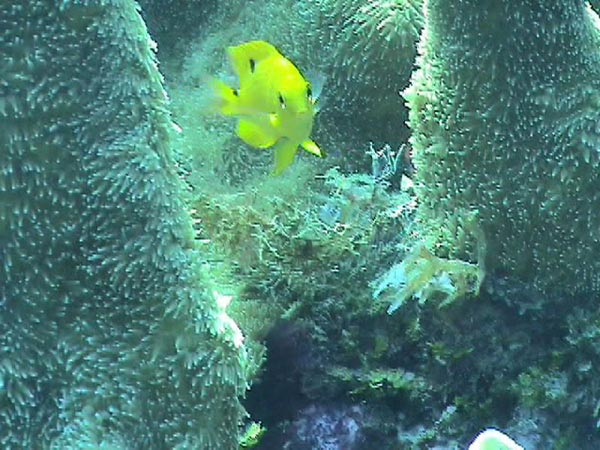
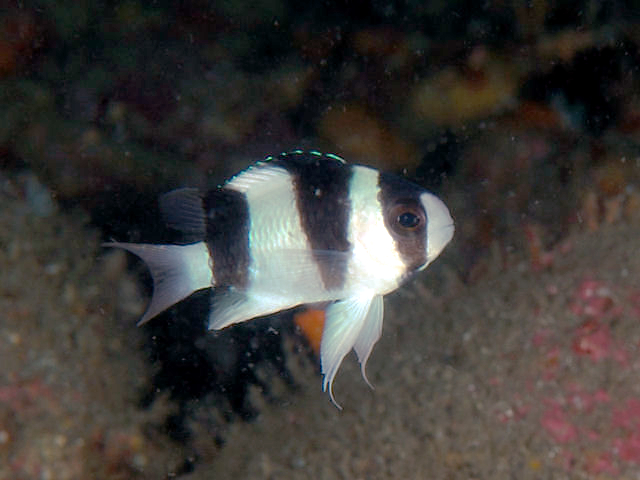
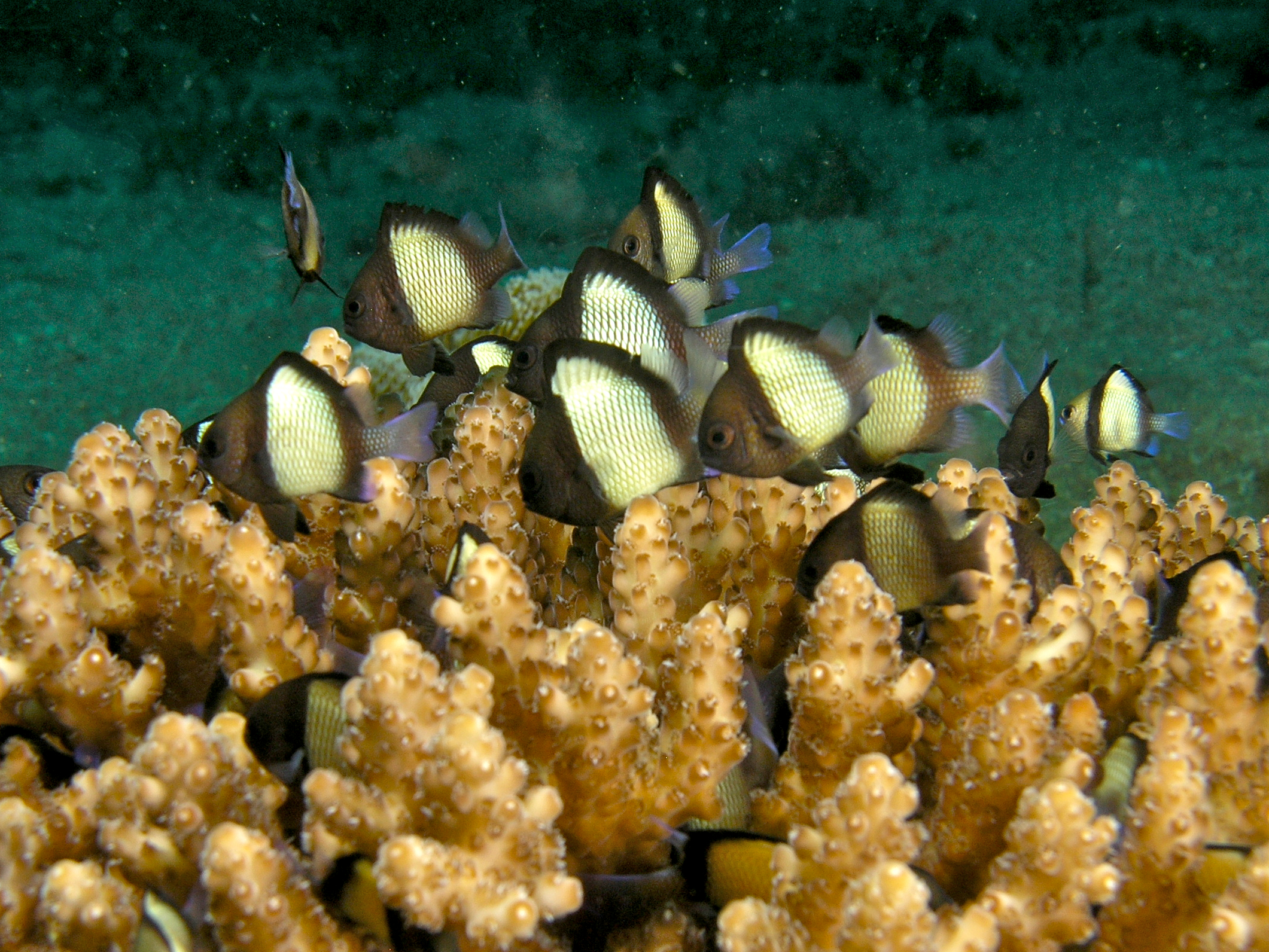
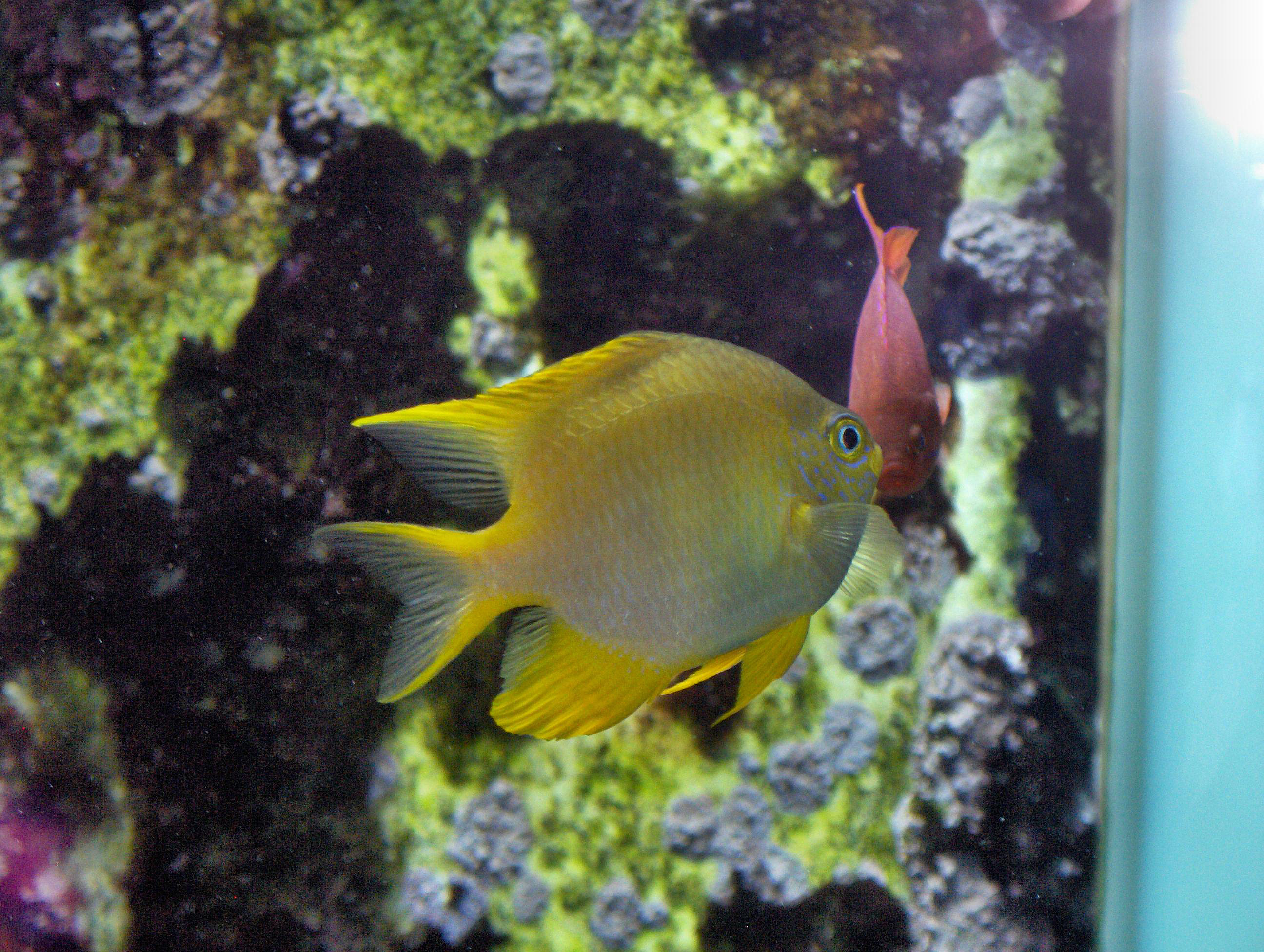
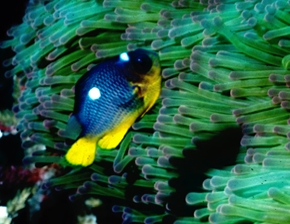
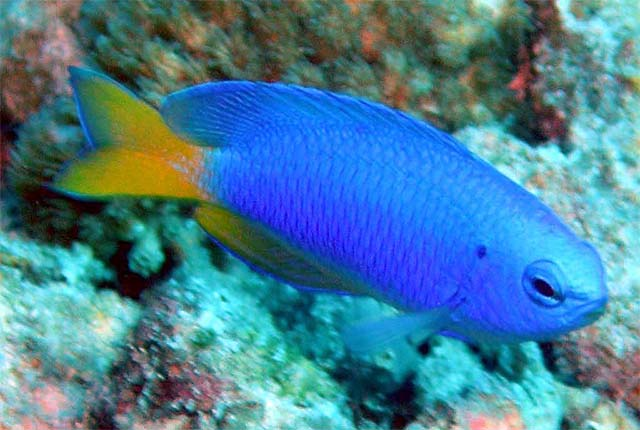
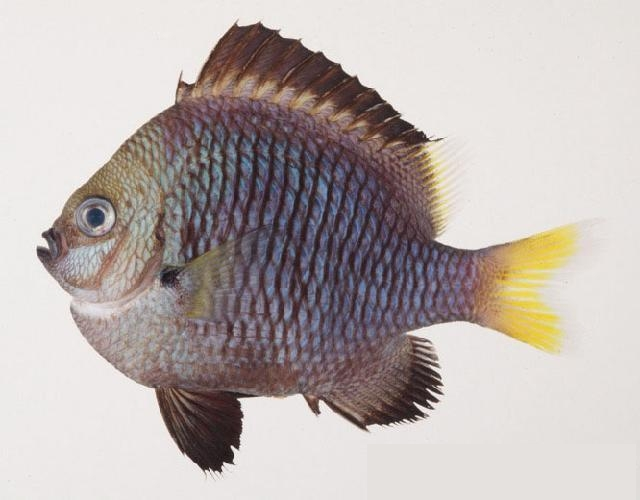
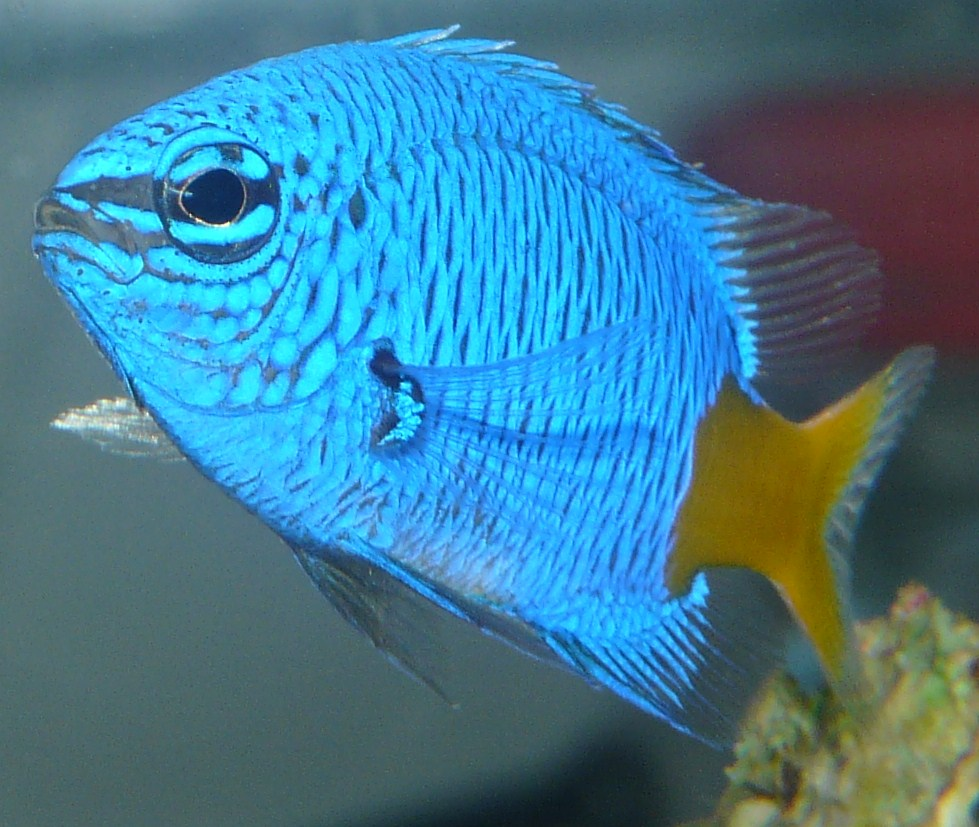
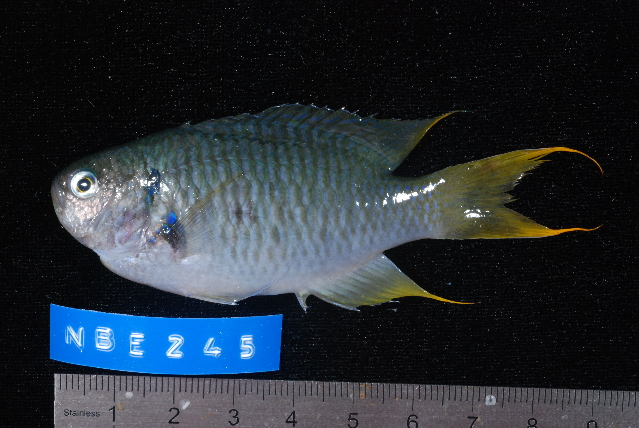
Common name	Image	Taxonomy	Reef safe	Description	Max size
Ambon damsel		Pomacentrus amboinensis	Yes		10 cm (3.9 in)
Azure damsel		Chrysiptera hemicyanea	Yes	A beautiful fish with neon blue on its body and a gold underside and caudal fin. Easy to care for and does best on a good diet. Fairly aggressive so choose tankmates carefully.	10 cm (3.9 in)
Black and gold damsel		Neoglyphidodon nigroris	Yes		13 cm (5.1 in)
Blackmargined damsel		Pomacentrus nigromarginatus	Yes		9 cm (3.5 in)
Blue damsel, Orangetail damsel		Chrysiptera cyanea	Yes	An orange tail indicates breeding success. The males have orange on their tails while the females do not. This fish is hardy and aggressive.	8.5 cm (3.3 in)
Blue and gold damsel		Pomacentrus coelestis	Yes		9 cm (3.5 in)
Blue velvet damsel		Paraglyphidodon oxyodon	Yes		15 cm (5.9 in)
Blueback damsel		Pomacentrus simsiang	Yes		9 cm (3.5 in)
Blueline demoiselle, Yellowfin demoiselle		Chrysiptera caeruleolineata	Yes		6 cm (2.4 in)
Bluefin damsel		Neoglyphidodon melas	Yes		18 cm (7.1 in)
Caerulean damsel		Pomacentrus caeruleus	Yes		8 cm (3.1 in)
Canary deep water damsel		Chrysiptera galba	Yes		9 cm (3.5 in)
Cloudy damsel		Dascyllus carneus	Yes		7 cm (2.8 in)
Cross' damsel		Neoglyphidodon crossi	Yes		13 cm (5.1 in)
Domino damsel		Dascyllus trimaculatus	Yes	also known as the three spot damsel, this fish is easy to care for, but is also very aggressive. The fish is black except for three distinct white spots that fade as the fish ages.	14 cm (5.5 in)
Fiji blue devil damsel		Chrysiptera taupou	Yes	This striking blue damsel is one of the most popular beginner fish. Like other damsels, it is very hardy, and very aggressive when mature.	8 cm (3.1 in)
Four stripe damsel		Dascyllus melanurus	Yes	The four stripe damsel is a perfect beginner marine fish as it is very hardy. This fish is highly territorial and is best suited for a semi-aggressive to aggressive tank.	10 cm (3.9 in)
Garibaldi damsel		Hypsypops rubicunda	Yes	These are temperate fish and require cooler water. They are much larger than most other damsels.	30 cm (11.8 in)
Honey head damsel		Dischistodus prosopotaenia	Yes		17 cm (6.7 in)
Hawaiian Dascyllus		Dascyllus albisella	Yes		12.5 cm (4.9 in)
Jewel damsel		Microspathodon chrysurus	Yes	Among the largest and most aggressive Damsels	20 cm (7.9 in)
King demoiselle		Chrysiptera rex	Yes		7 cm (2.8 in)
Lemon damsel		Pomacentrus moluccensis	Yes		9 cm (3.5 in)
Longfin gregory		Stegastes diencaeus	Caution	Turns brown, and becomes highly territorial as it ages	12.5 cm (4.9 in)
Marginated damsel		Dascyllus marginatus	Yes	The marginated damsel is noted for blue fins as well as the yellow head and white body. This fish is hardy like most damsels and is also highly aggressive when mature.	6 cm (2.4 in)
Neon damsel		Pomacentrus alleni	Yes		6 cm (2.4 in)
Ocellate damsel		Pomacentrus vaiuli	Yes		9 cm (3.5 in)
Pavo damsel		Pomacentrus pavo	Yes		11 cm (4.3 in)
Pink Smith damsel		Pomacentrus smithi	Yes		7 cm (2.8 in)
Rolland's demoiselle		Chrysiptera rollandi	Yes		6 cm (2.4 in)
Sergeant major damsel		Abudefduf saxatilis	Yes		15 cm (5.9 in)
Speckled damsel		Pomacentrus bankanensis	Yes		9 cm (3.5 in)
Springer's damsel		Chrysiptera springeri	Yes		5.5 cm (2.2 in)
Stark's damsel		Chrysiptera starcki	Yes		7 cm (2.8 in)
Talbots damsel		Chrysiptera talboti	Yes	This damselfish is somewhat a little more delicate than other. It does best in small groups in large tanks with good water quality and an SG of 1.026. Feed on a good diet for best results. Fairly peaceful.	8 cm (3.1 in)
Three stripe damsel		Dascyllus aruanus	Yes	Highly aggressive and territorial. Will harass fish many times its size. Best kept in an aggressive/semi-aggressive tank.	10 cm (3.9 in)
Three Spot damsel		Stegastes planifrons	Yes		13 cm (5.1 in)
Tuxedo damsel		Chrysiptera tricincta	Yes		6 cm (2.4 in)
Two stripe damsel		Dascyllus reticulatus	Yes	the two stripe damsel is a very hardy fish. This fish is perfect for the beginner marine aquarist, as it can tolerate substandard water quality. This fish is highly aggressive, and requires many hiding places.	10 cm (3.9 in)
Yellow damsel		Amblyglyphidodon aureus	Yes		13 cm (5.1 in)
Yellow threespot Dascyllus		Dascyllus auripinnis	Yes		14.5 cm (5.7 in)
Yellowbelly damsel		Pomacentrus auriventris	Yes		5.5 cm (2.2 in)
Yellowtail Dascyllus		Dascyllus flavicaudus	Yes		12 cm (4.7 in)
Yellowtail damsel		Chrysiptera parasema	Yes	The yellowtail damsel possess an all blue body with a striking yellow tail. This damsel is a good beginner fish as it is very hardy and can tolerate substandard water quality. This damsel is also less aggressive than some other damsel species.	8 cm (3.1 in)
Yellowtail demoiselle		Neopomacentrus azysron	Yes		7.5 cm (3.0 in)

== Dartfish ==
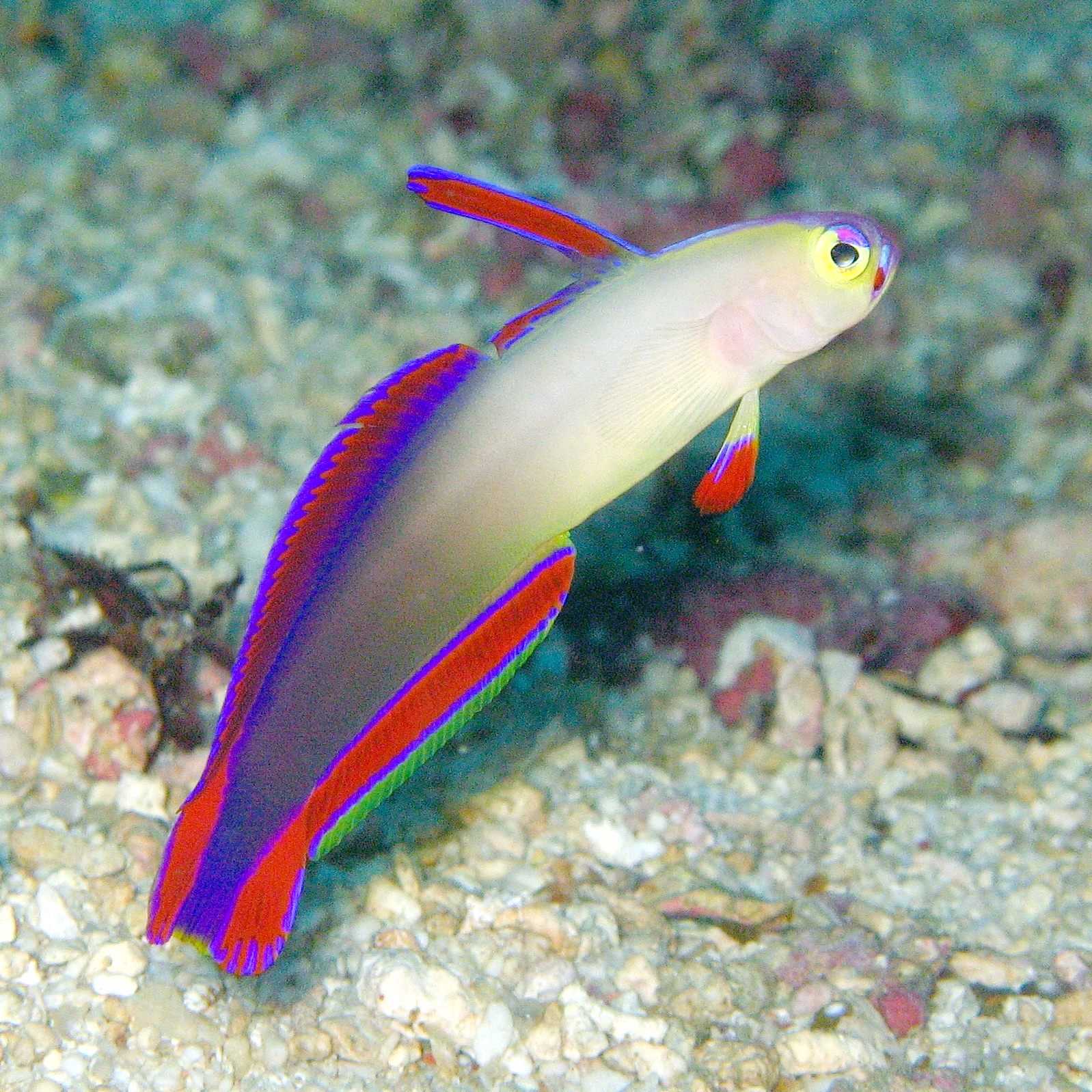
Purple firefish

Most should be kept as pairs or small groups where all individuals are added at once.

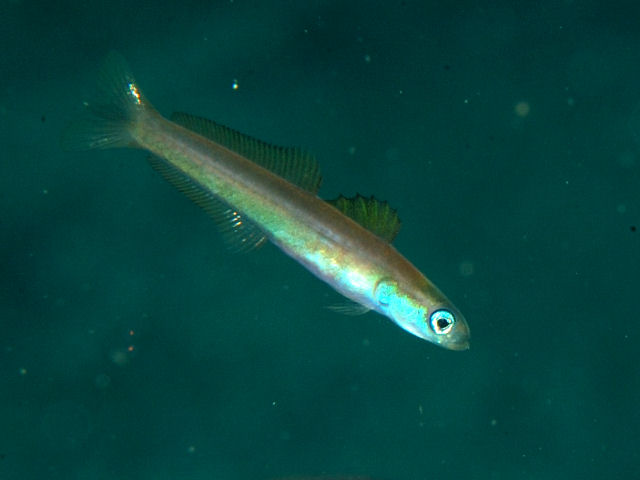
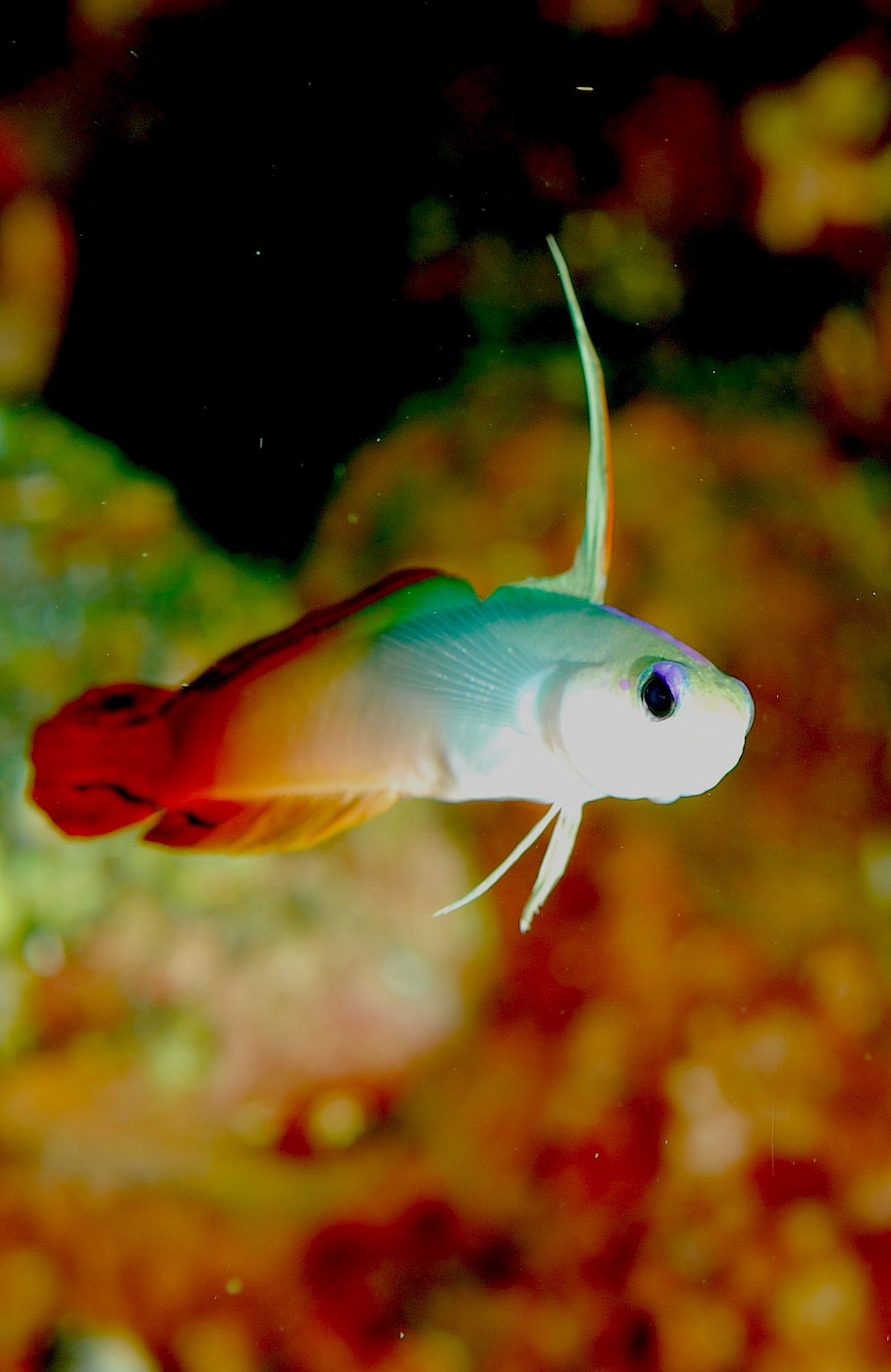
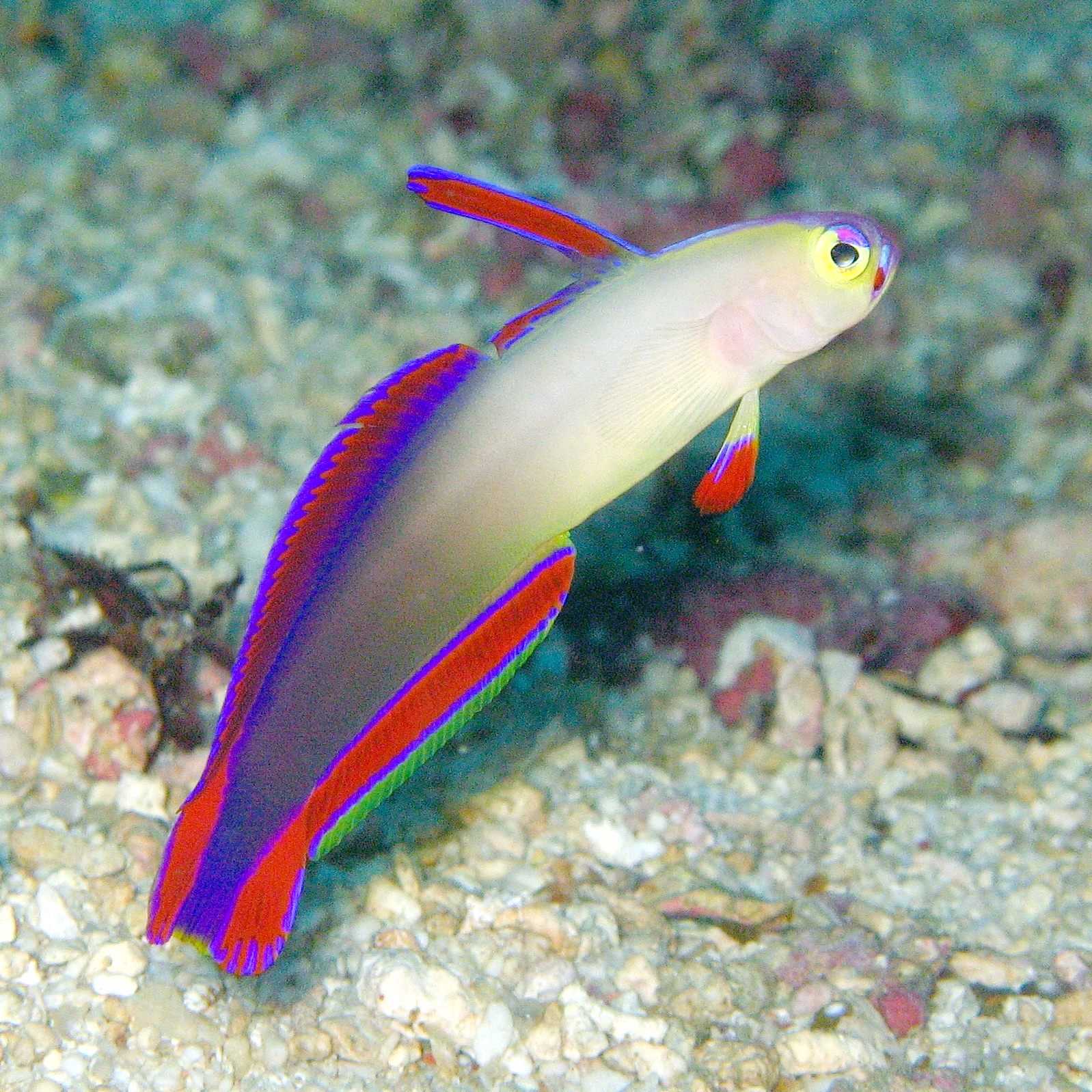
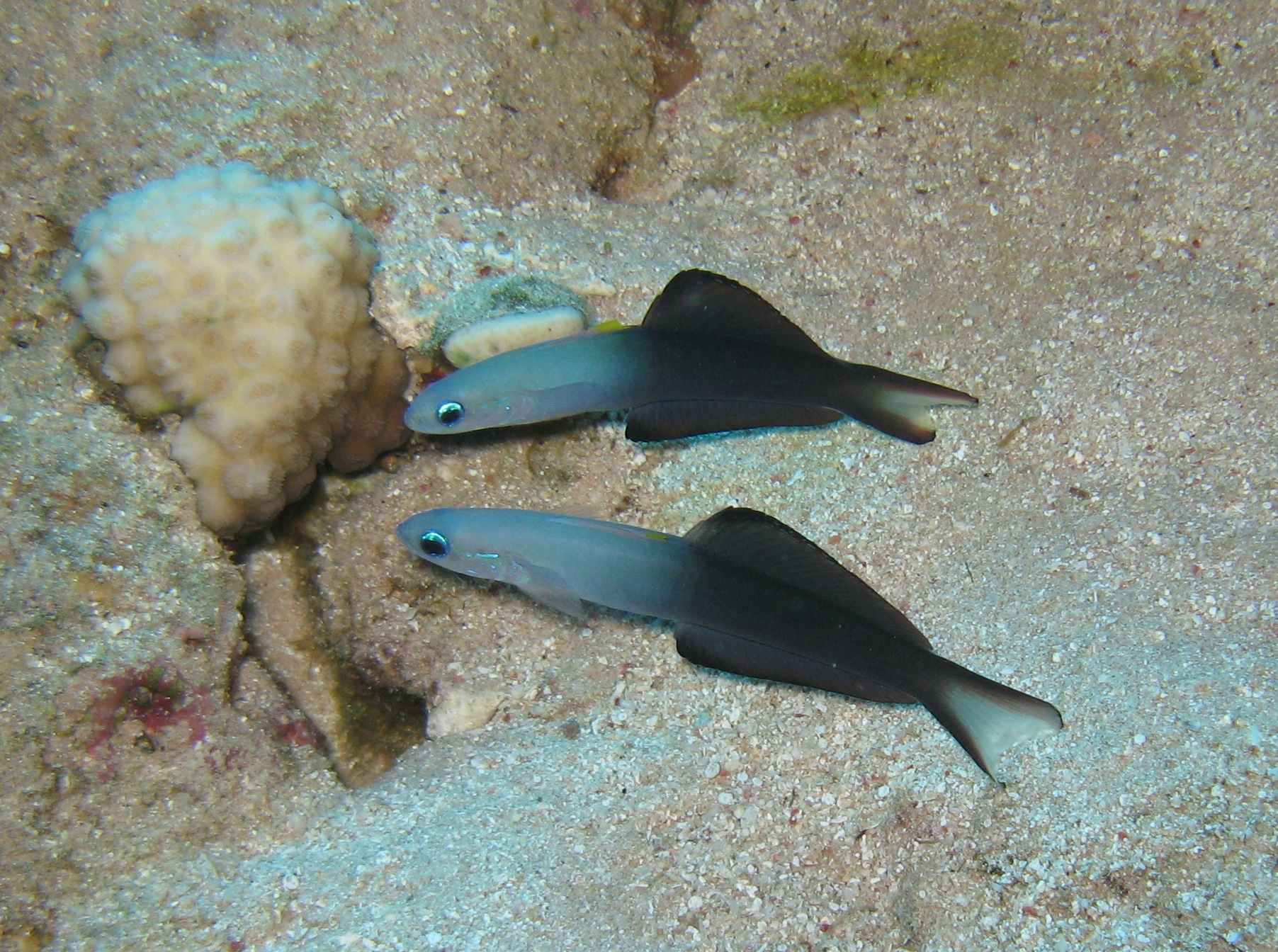
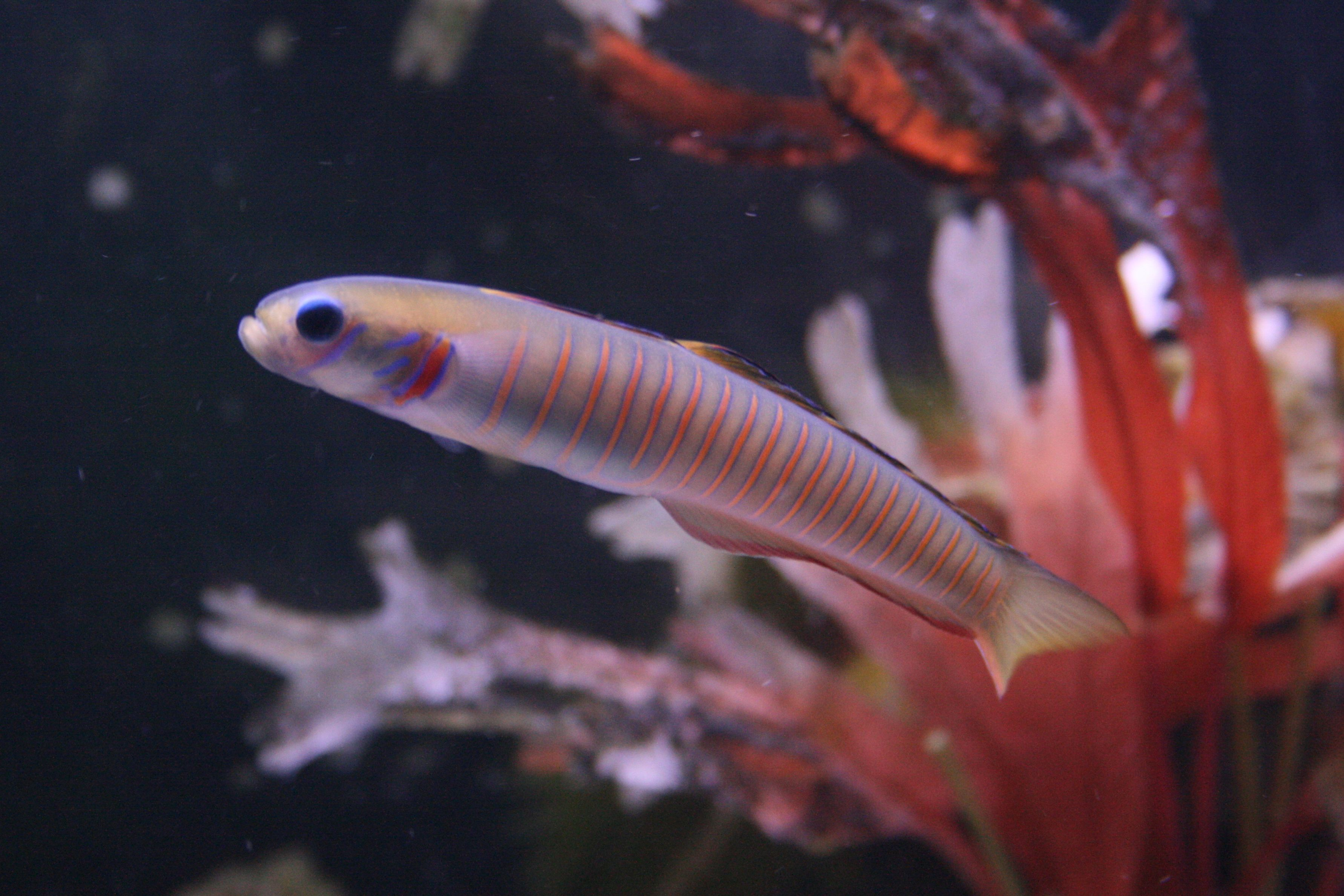
Common name	Image	Taxonomy	Reef safe	Description	Max size
Blue gudgeon dartfish		Ptereleotris hanae	Yes		13 cm (5.1 in)
Fire fish		Nemateleotris magnifica	Yes		9 cm (3.5 in)
Purple fire fish		Nemateleotris decora	Yes		9 cm (3.5 in)
Scissortail dartfish		Ptereleotris evides	Yes		14 cm (5.5 in)
Zebra barred dartfish		Ptereleotris zebra	Yes		10 cm (3.9 in)

== Dragonets ==
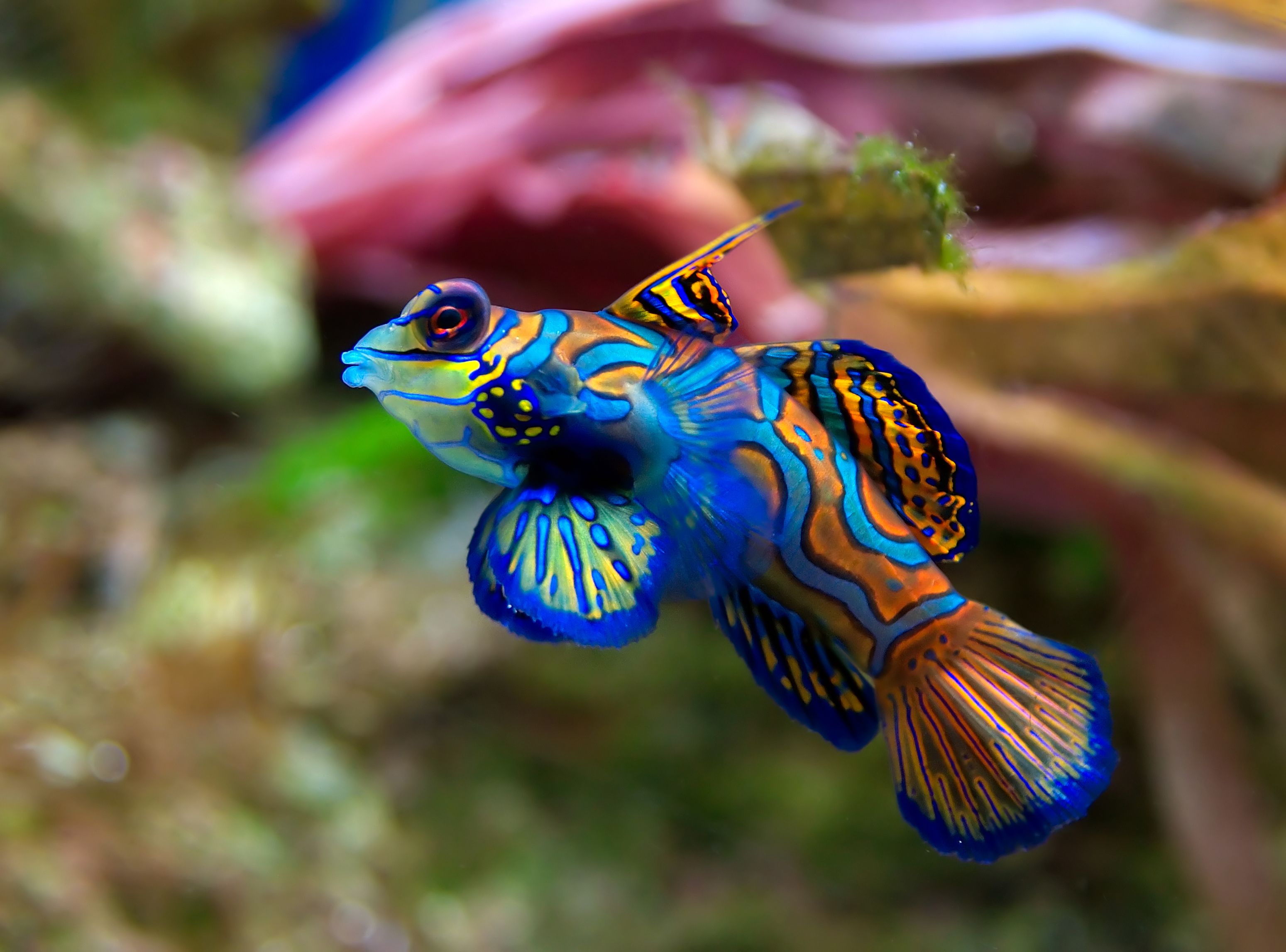
Mandarinfish (Synchiropus splendidus)

Dragonets are often misclassified as gobies or blennies by fish sellers. They are bottom-dwelling fish that constantly hunt tiny invertebrates for food. Most starve to death in a marine aquarium unless a place, such as a refugium, is available for the invertebrates to reproduce safely without any fish being able to reach them.

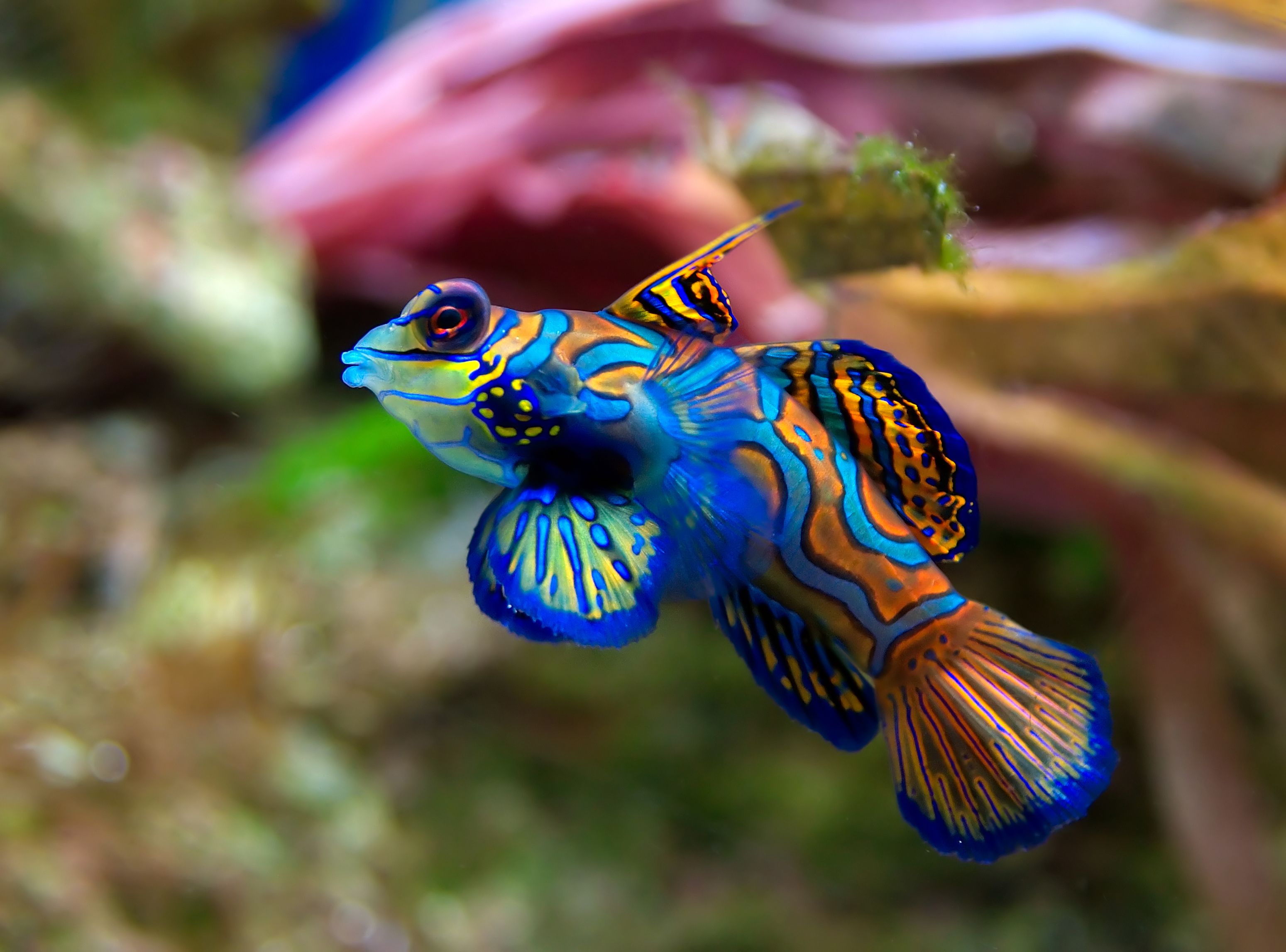
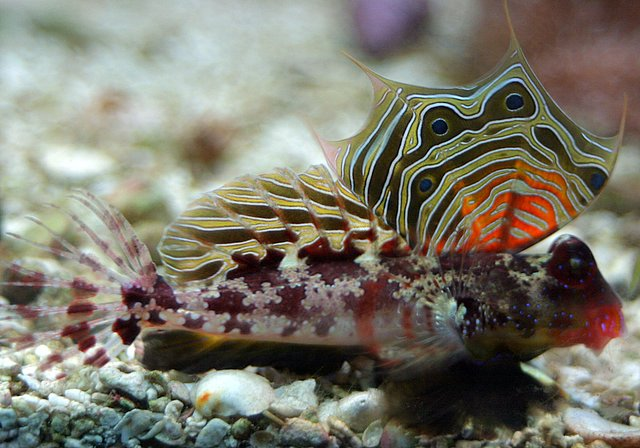
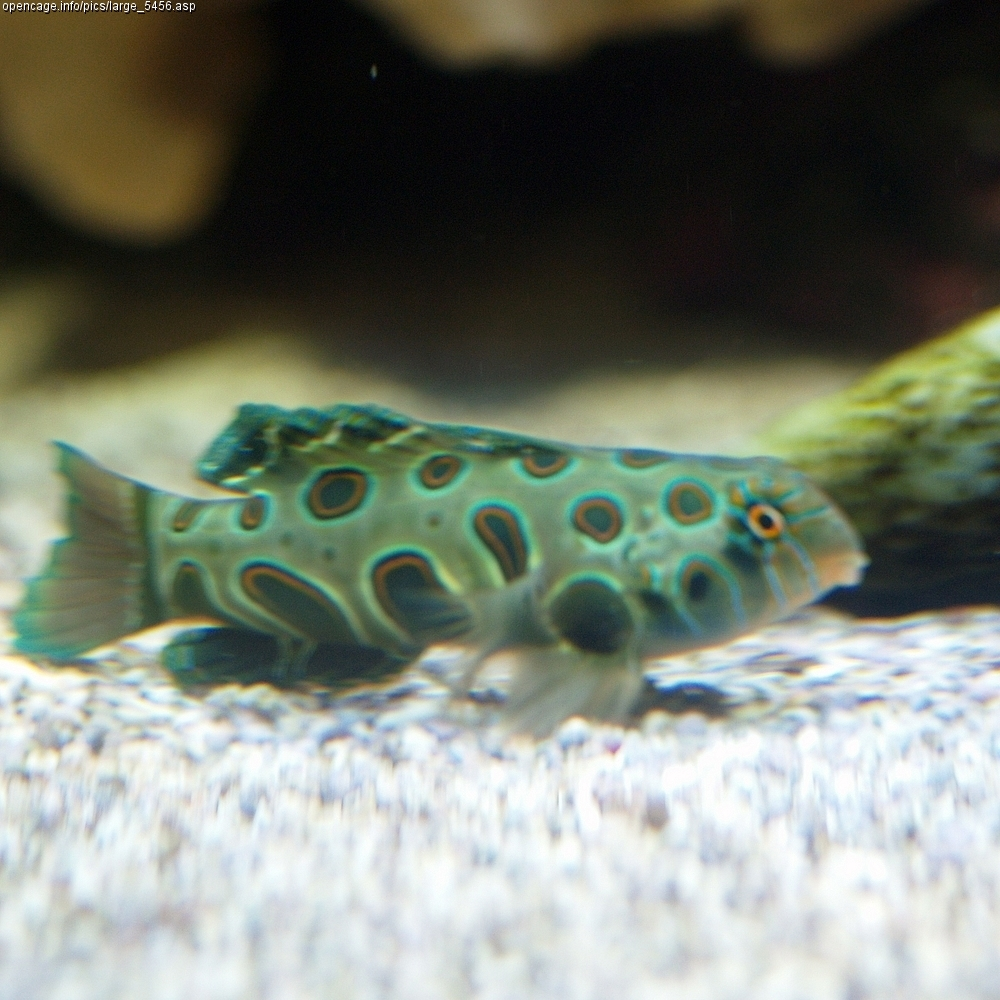
Common name	Image	Taxonomy	Reef safe	Description	Max size
Mandarinfish		Synchiropus splendidus	Yes	A brightly colored member of the dragonet family. Eats only copepods and will die in captivity without an adequate supply, which can only be had in very large, well established reef tanks	6 cm (2.4 in)
Starry dragonet		Synchiropus stellatus	Yes	Also known as red scooter blenny though not a true blenny. Will often only eat live copepods and amphipods.	12 cm (4.7 in)
Ocellated dragonet		Synchiropus ocellatus	Yes	Also known as scooter blenny though not a true blenny. Will often only eat live copepods and amphipods.	8 cm (3.1 in)
Spotted mandarin		Synchiropus picturatus	Yes	Often only eats live copepods and amphipods.	10 cm (3.9 in)

== Eels ==
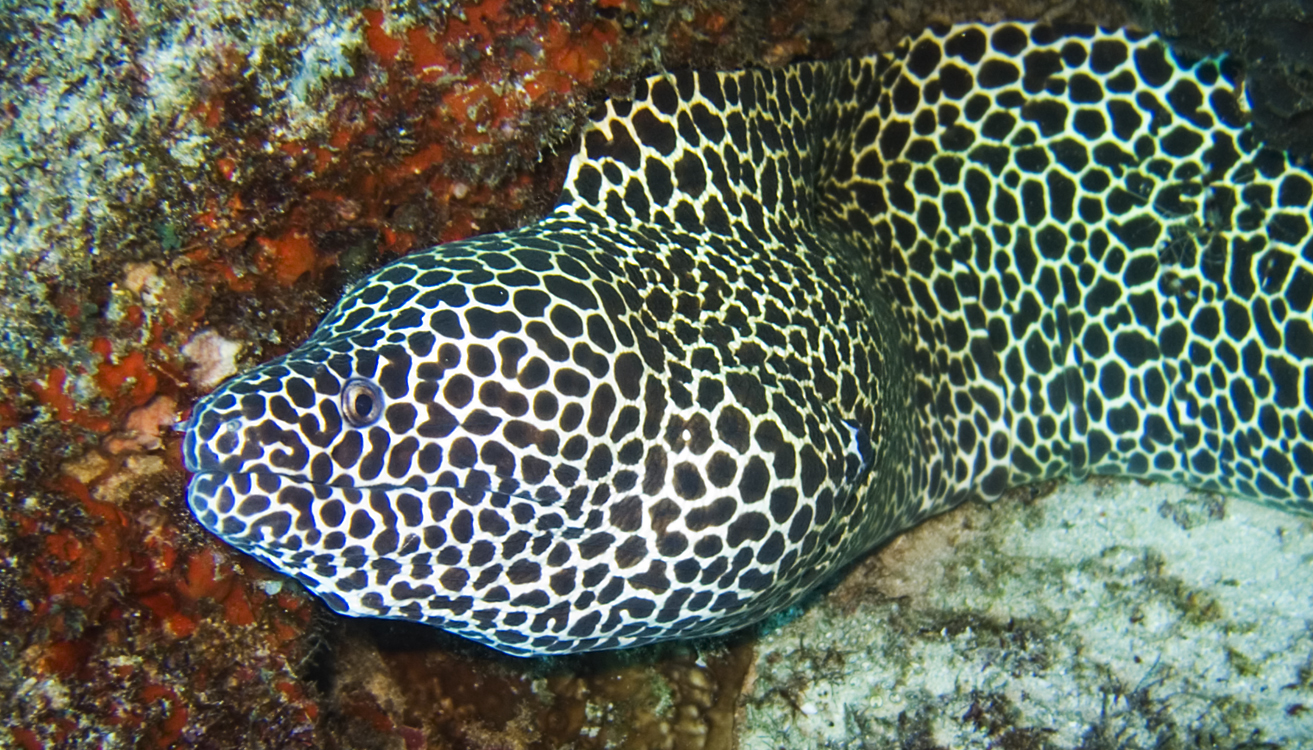
Laced moray

Most eels are easily kept in a large aquarium, although several species such as the blue ribbon eel should usually be avoided. With any moray eel care must be taken to secure the lid as one of the most common causes of death is escaping from the tank, and onto the floor.

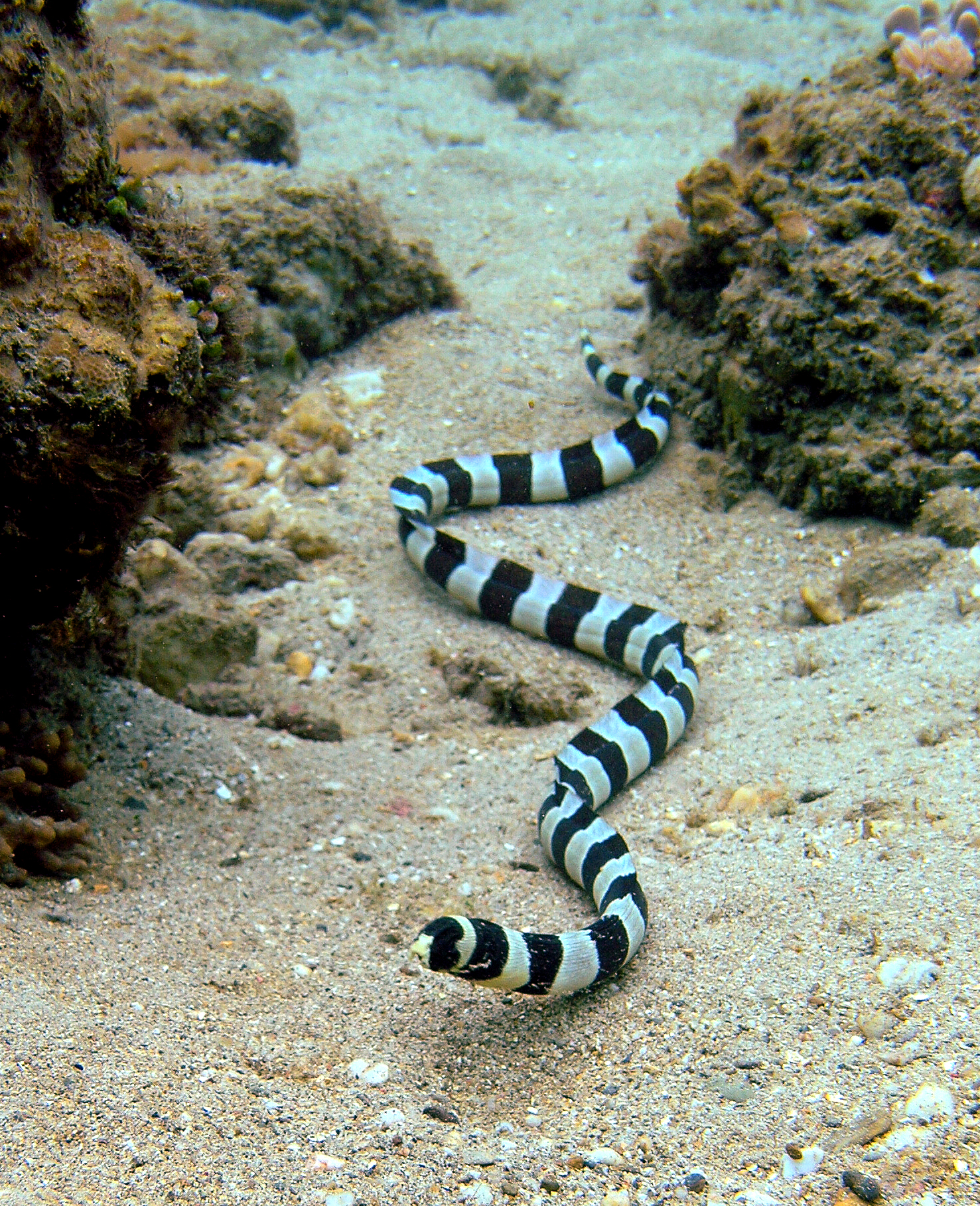
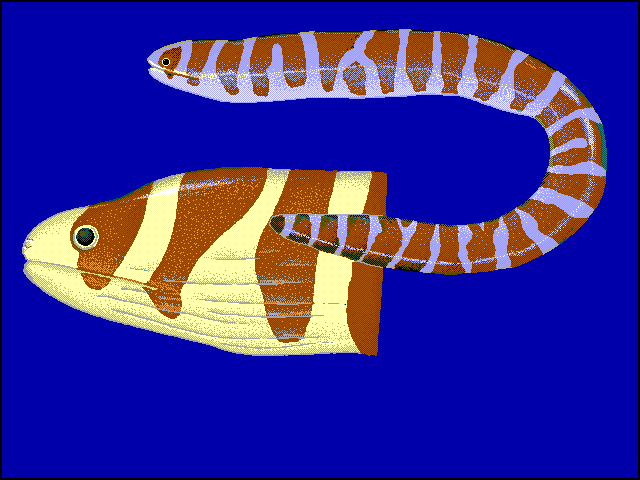
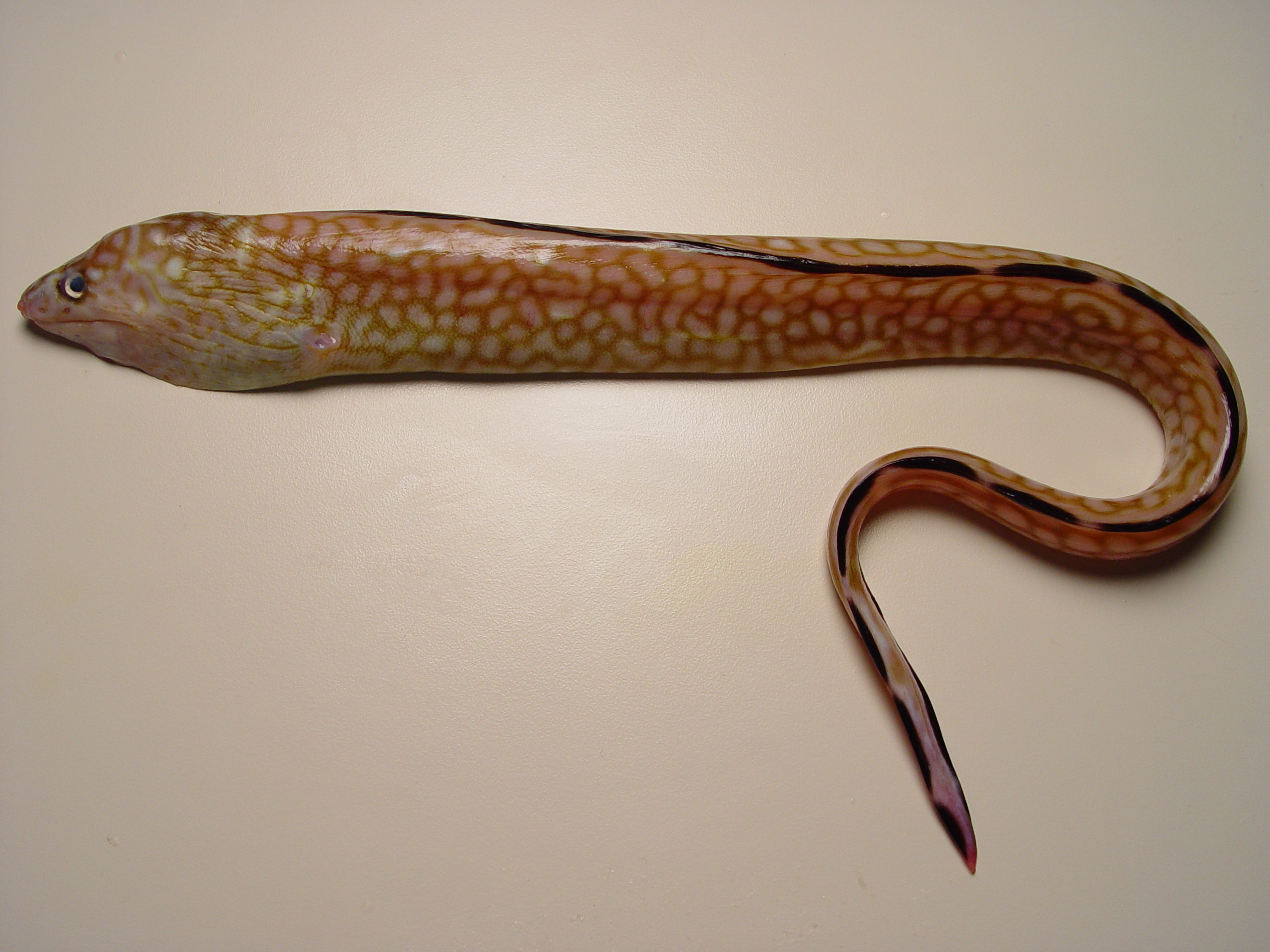
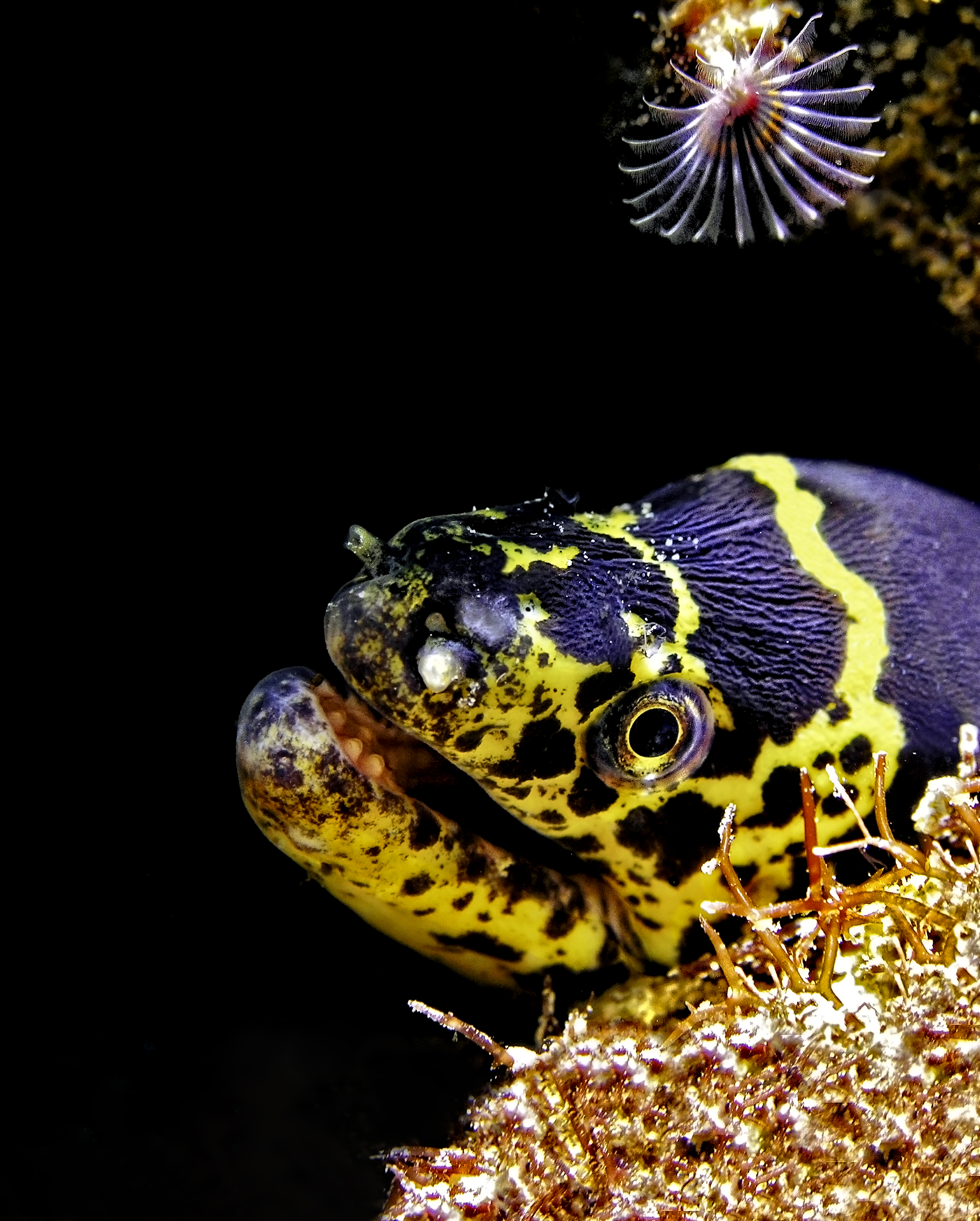
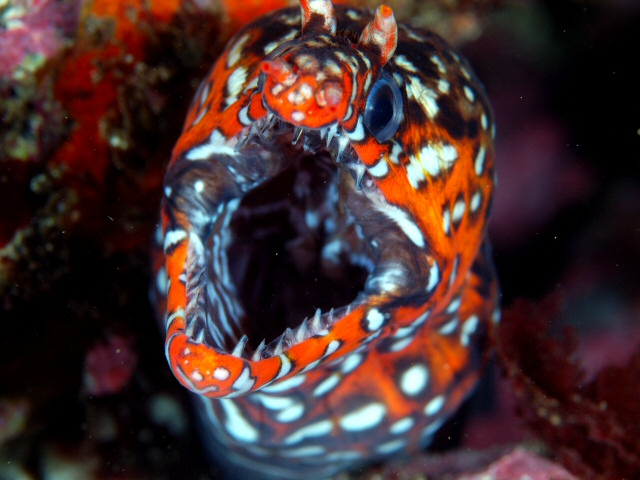
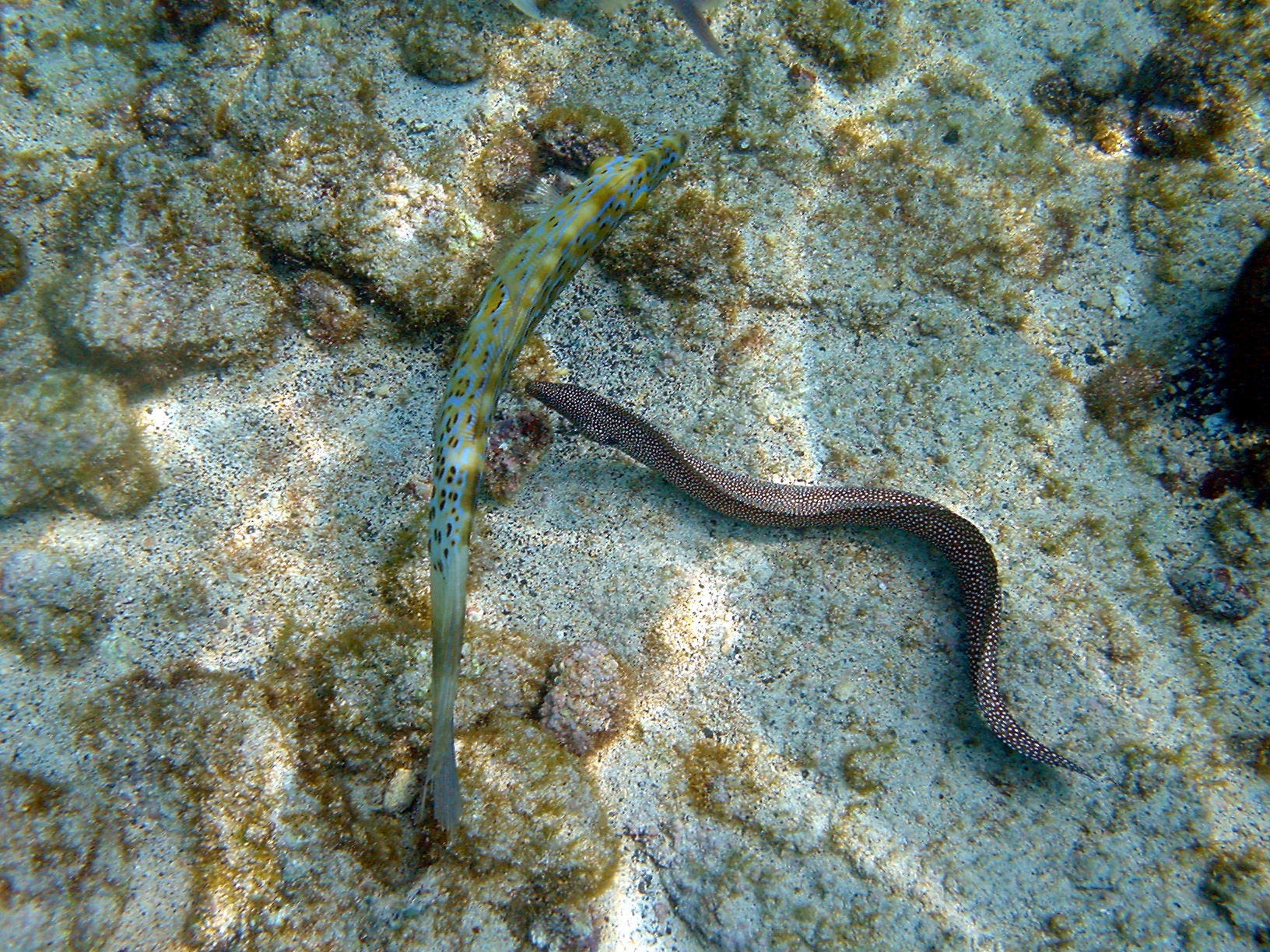
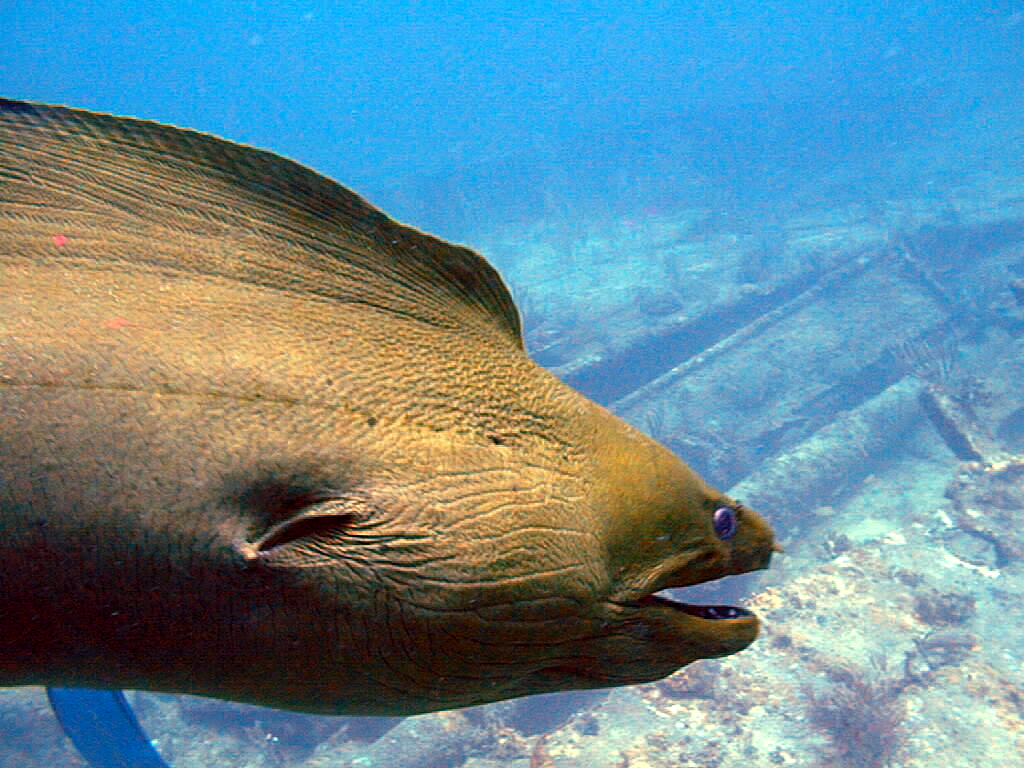
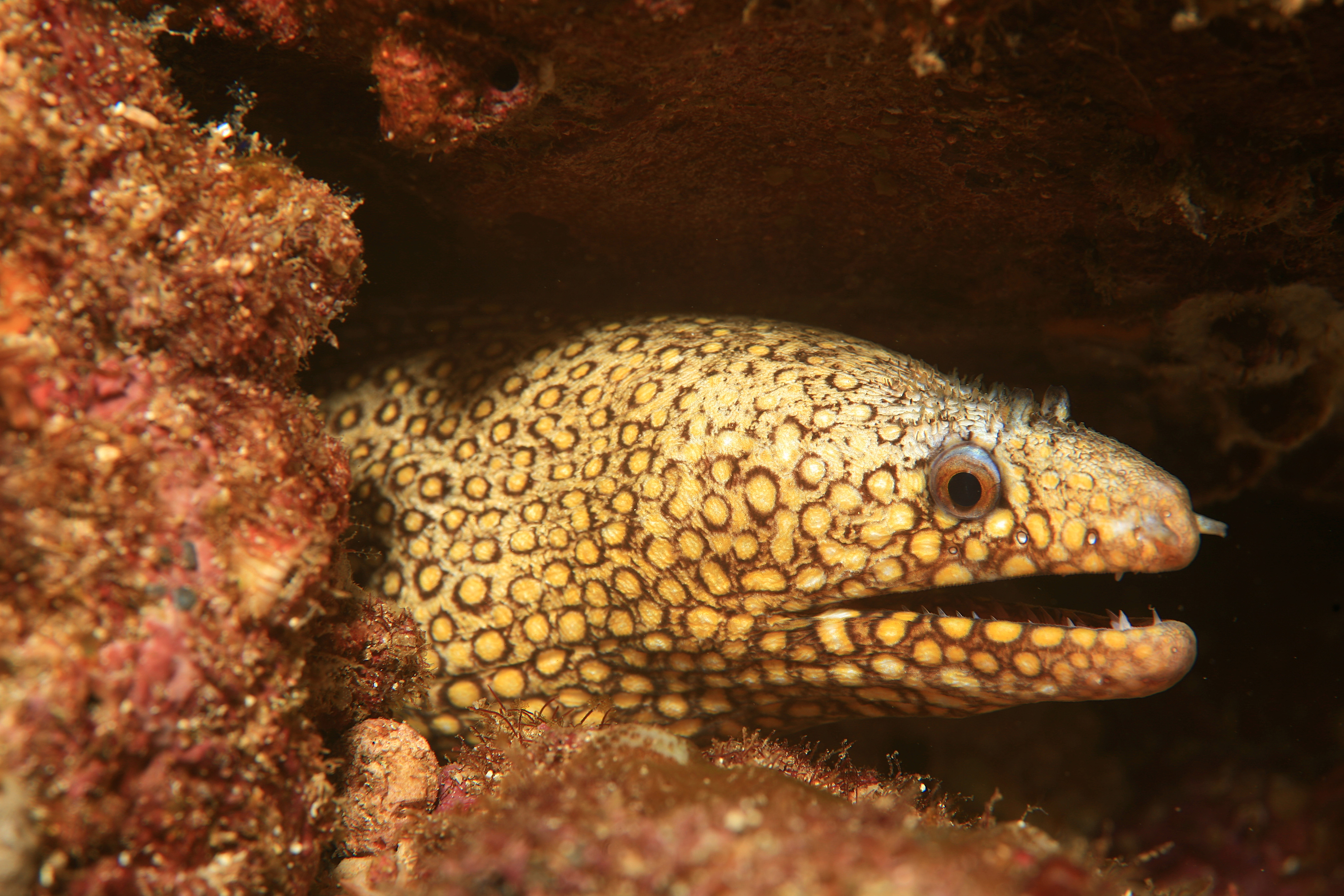
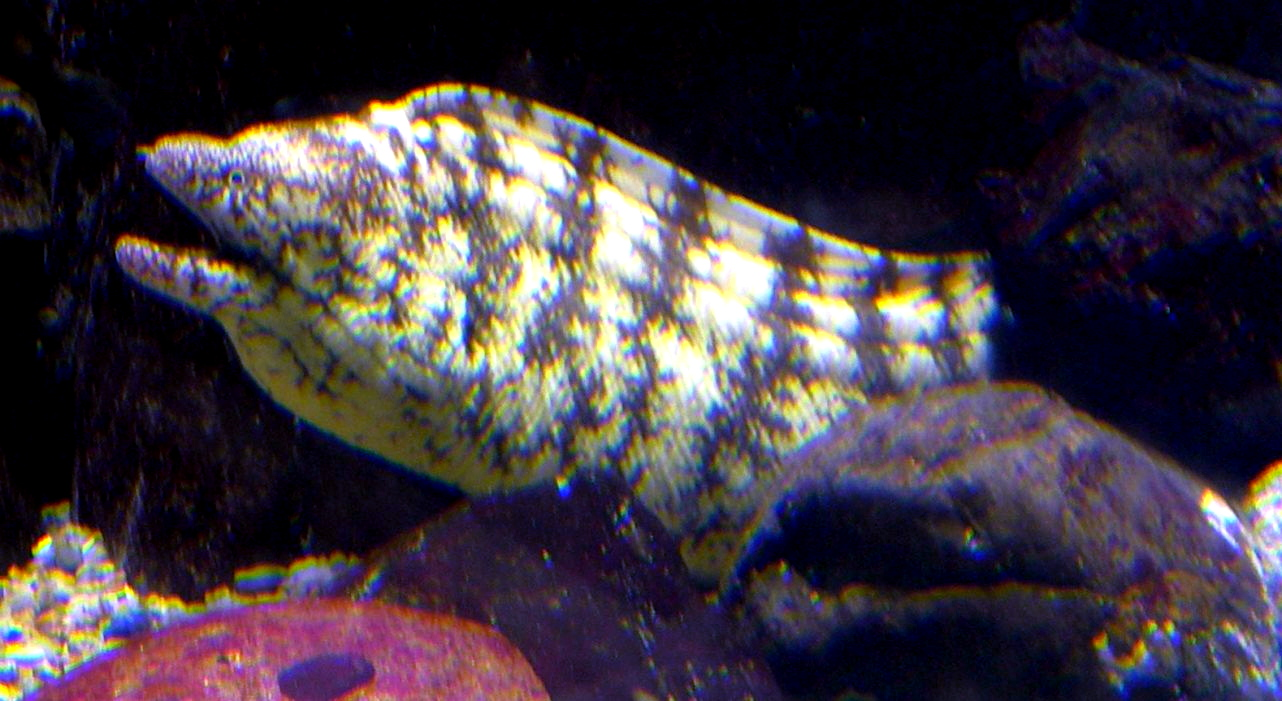
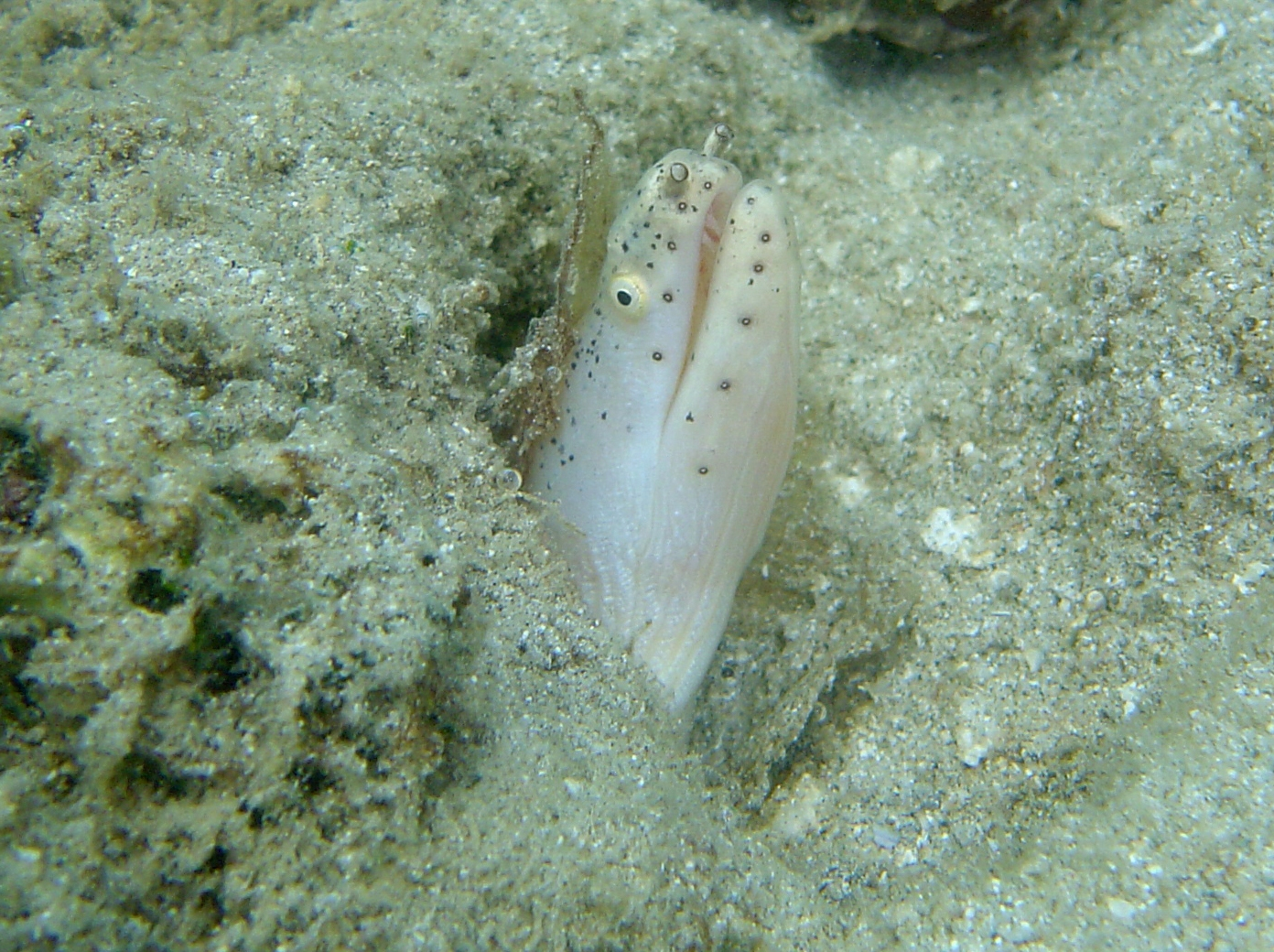
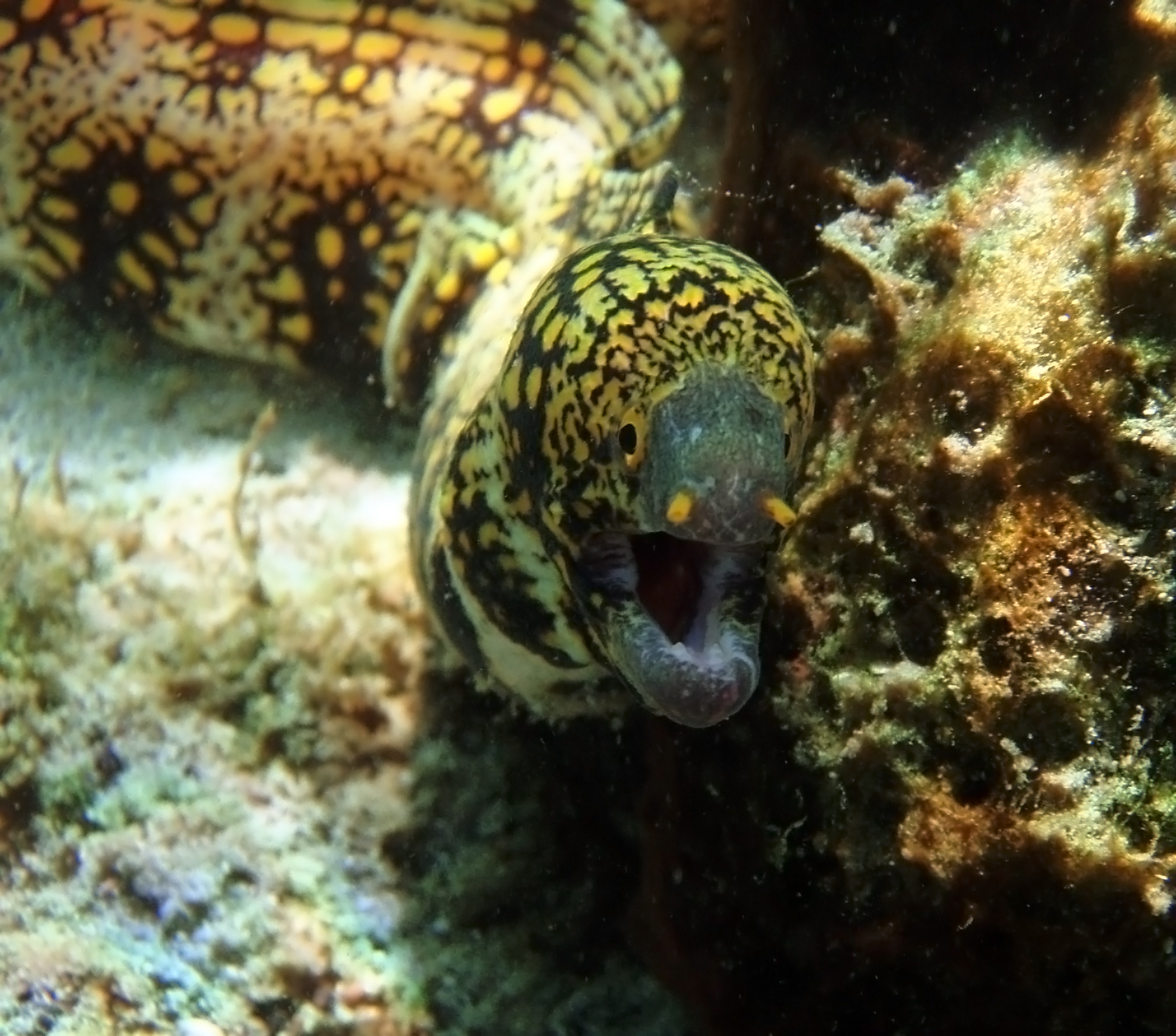
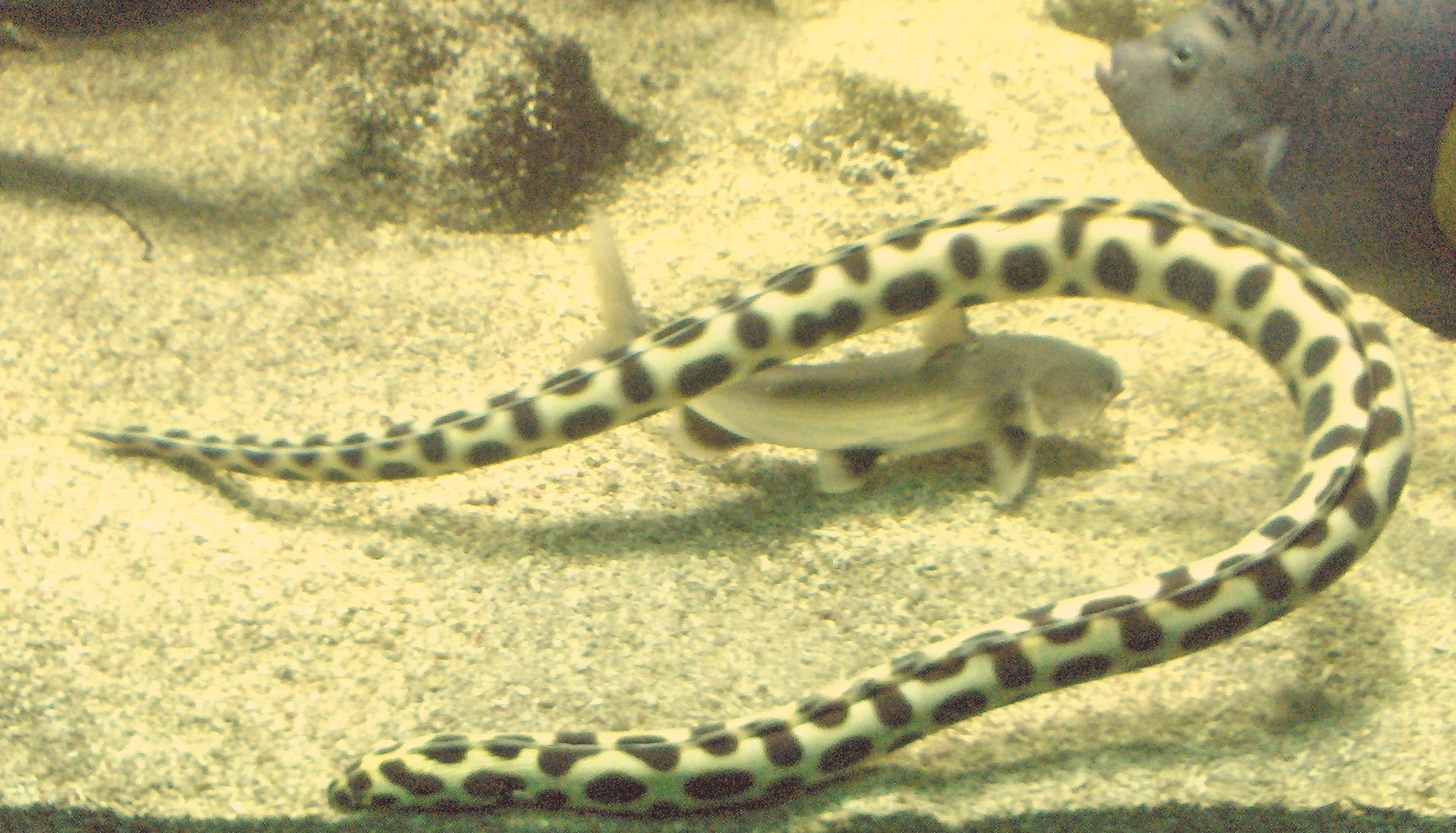
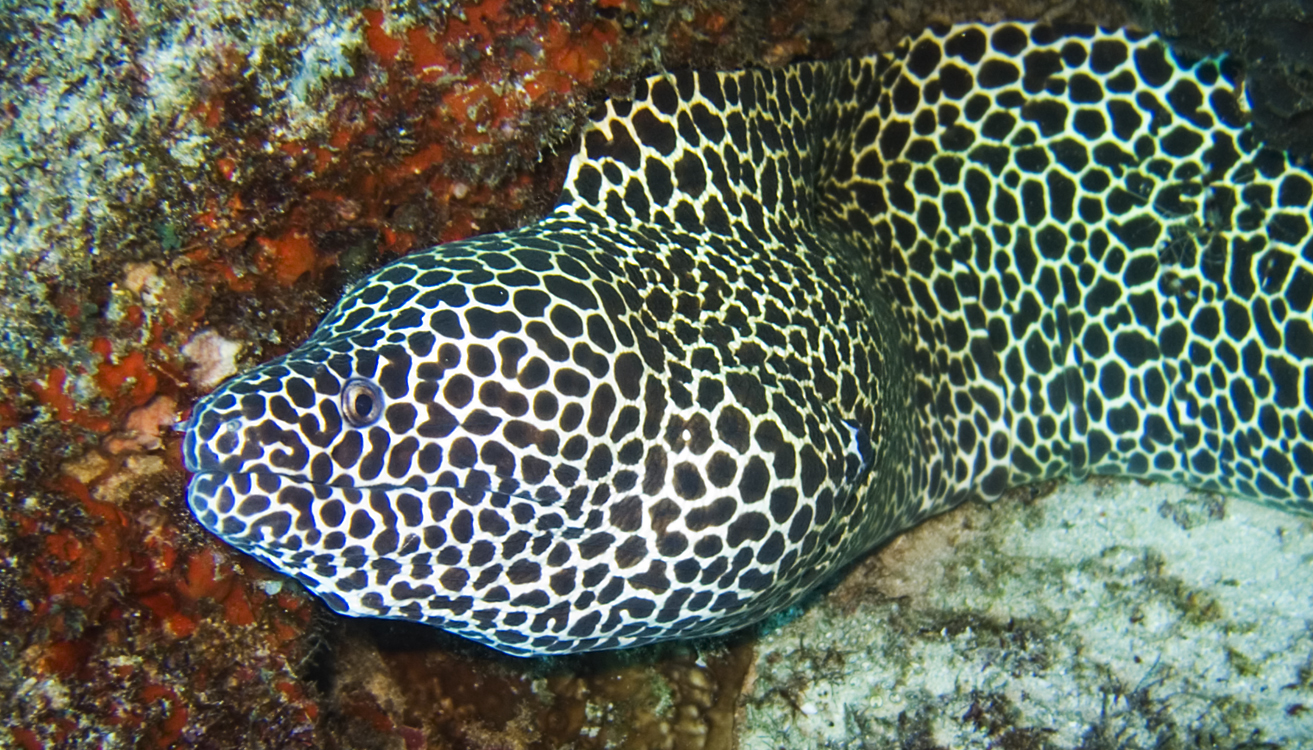
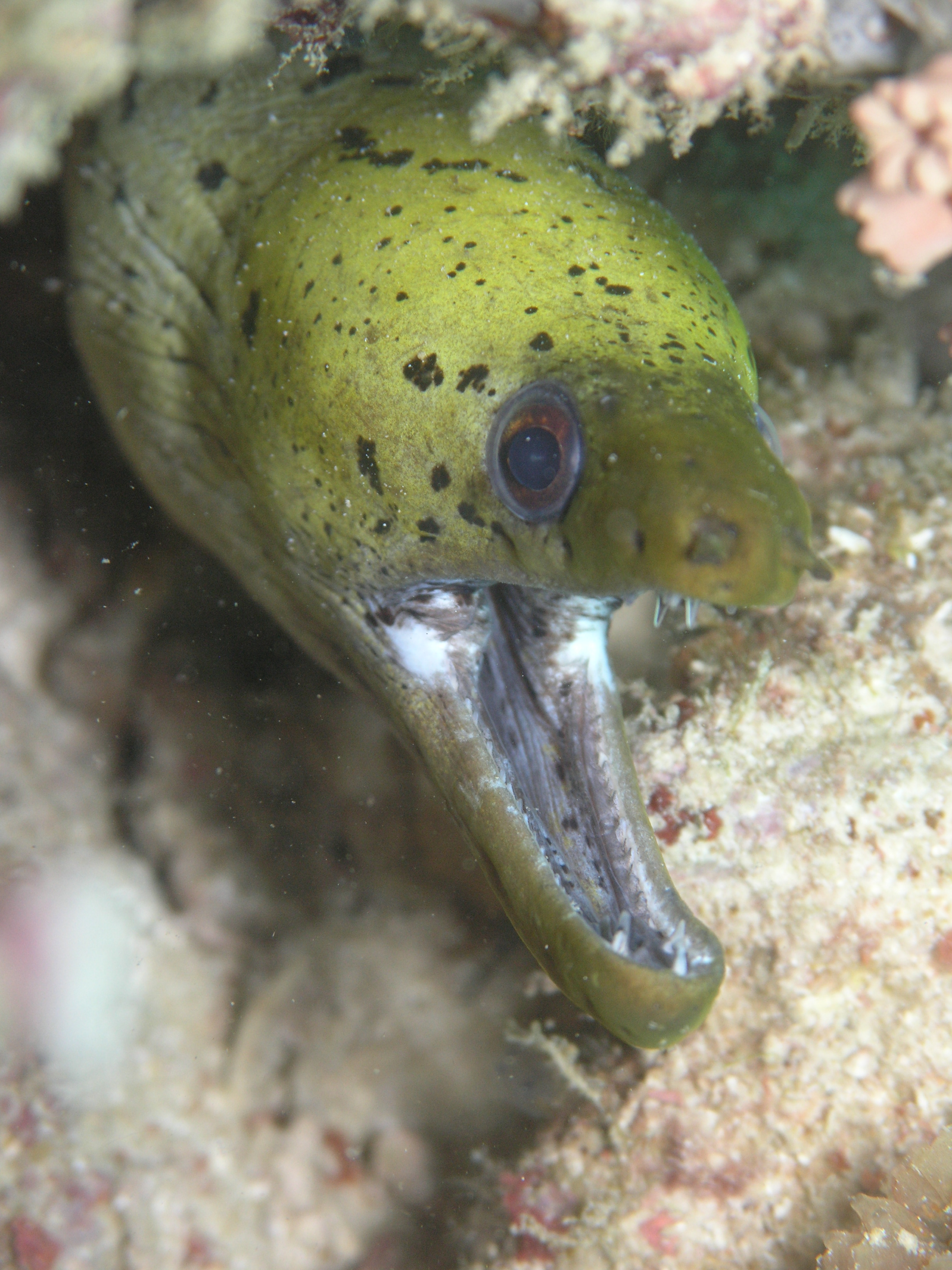
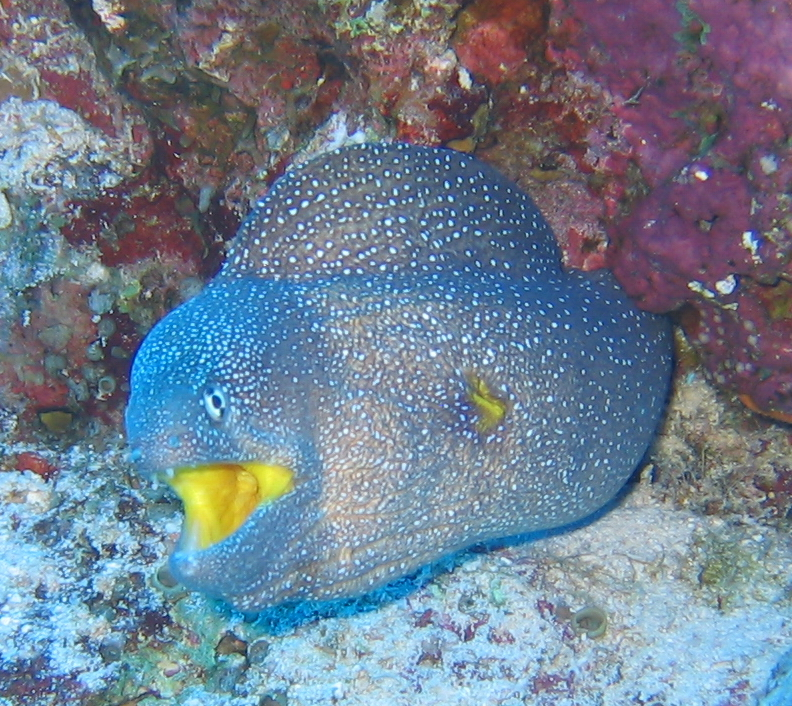
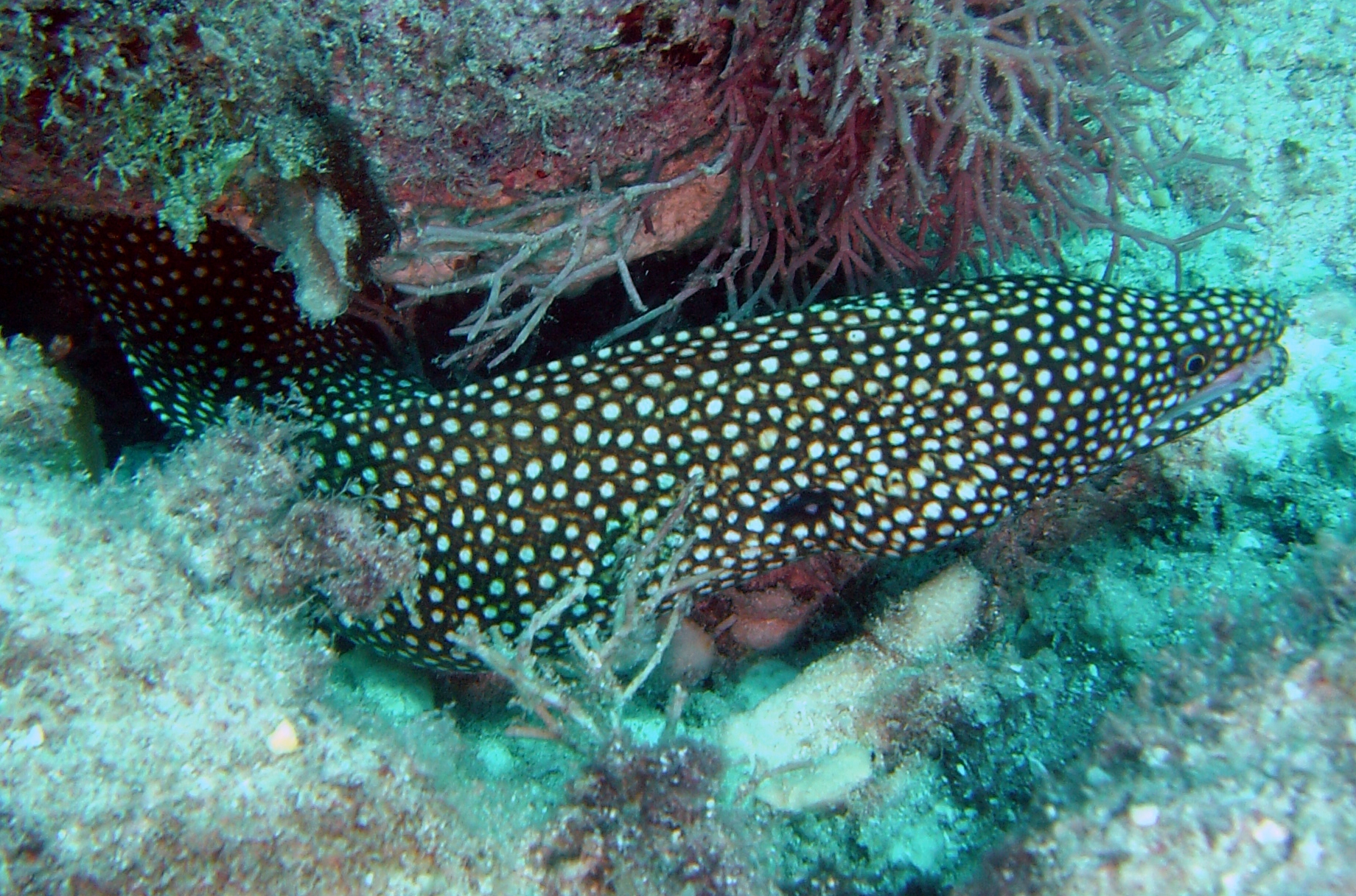
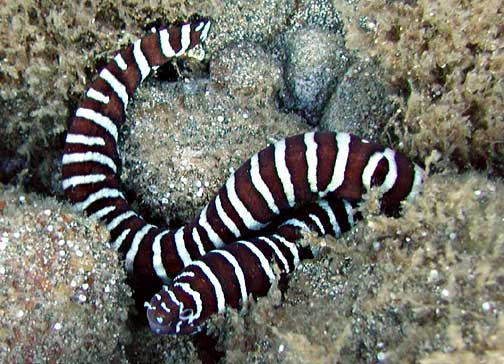
Common name	Image	Taxonomy	Reef safe	Description	Max size
Banded snake eel		Myrichthys colubrinus	No		97 cm (38.2 in)
Banded eel		Echidna polyzona	No		69 cm (27.2 in)
Black edge moray eel		Gymnothorax saxicola	No		60 cm (23.6 in)
Blue ribbon eel, black ribbon eel		Rhinomuraena quaesita	No		130 cm (51.2 in)
Chainlink moray eel		Echidna catenata	No	Can be kept with fish too small to swallow	165 cm (65.0 in)
Dragon moray eel		Enchelycore pardalis	No	A fish eater that will eat anything it can fit in its mouth. When available is typically quite expensive	92 cm (36.2 in)
Golden dwarf eel		Gymnothorax melatremus	Yes	Rarely available, among the smallest of the moray eels	26 cm (10.2 in)
Golden moray eel		Gymnothorax miliaris	May eat fish and shrimp	These fish should only be kept in fish-only tanks as any small invertebrates will be looked on as food. Keep with fish large enough not to be eaten. Feed on a diet of whitefish, cockles, cod roe, haddock and frozen foods.	70.0 cm (27.6 in)
Green moray eel		Gymnothorax funebris	No	Requires a 180-gallon tank with tight fitting lid. Compatible with rays, sharks, and other large fish.	250 cm (98.4 in)
Jeweled moray eel		Muraena lentiginosa	No		61 cm (24.0 in)
Kidako moray eel		Gymnothorax kidako	No		91 cm (35.8 in)
Peppered moray		Gymnothorax picta	No		135 cm (53.1 in)
Snowflake eel		Echidna nebulosa	May eat shrimp if underfed	A pebble-tooth moray that generally eats crustaceans and similar. Safer in reef aquariums than other species but be prepared to remove it in case it starts to eat desired invertebrates.	100 cm (39.4 in)
Spotted garden-eel		Heteroconger hassi	With Caution	NEEDS a very deep substrate (8 inches) and only eats plankton, when housing multiple make sure that there is enough space for each eels to be far enough away from each other	40 cm (15.7 in)
Spotted Snake eel		Myrichthys maculosus	No	Requires at least six in of substrate	100 cm (39.4 in)
Tessalata eel, or laced moray		Gymnothorax favagineus	No		300 cm (118.1 in)
Yellowhead moray eel		Gymnothorax fimbriatus	No		80 cm (31.5 in)
Yellow mouth moray eel		Gymnothorax nudivomer	No		178 cm (70.1 in)
Whitemouth moray eel		Gymnothorax meleagris	With Caution		120 cm (47.2 in)
Zebra moray		Gymnomuraena zebra	No	One of the easier moray eels to keep, is usually safe with most fish but will eat most invertebrates.	150 cm (59.1 in)

== Filefish ==
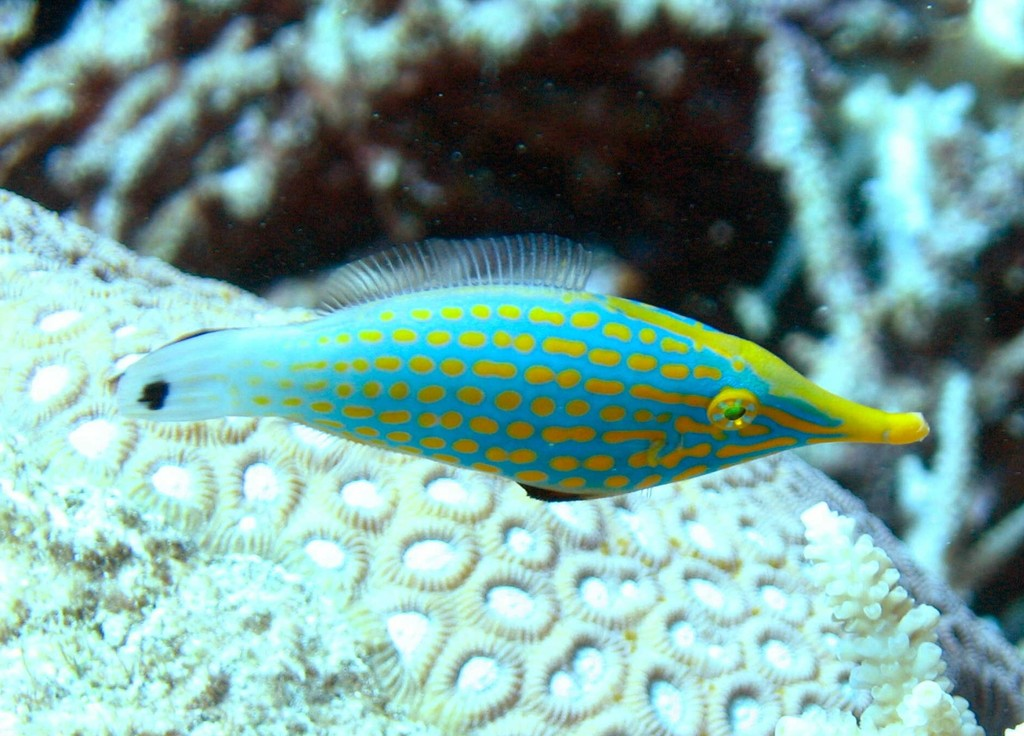
Orange spotted filefish

Less often kept than their relatives the triggerfish and puffers, there are many filefish that make good aquarium residents, and a few that require specialized diets, making it hard to sustain them in an aquarium.

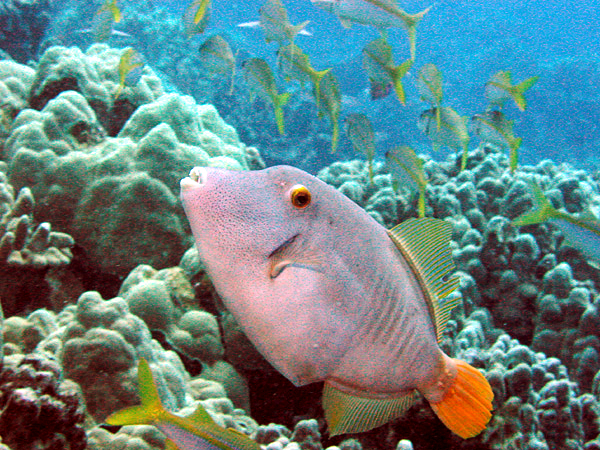
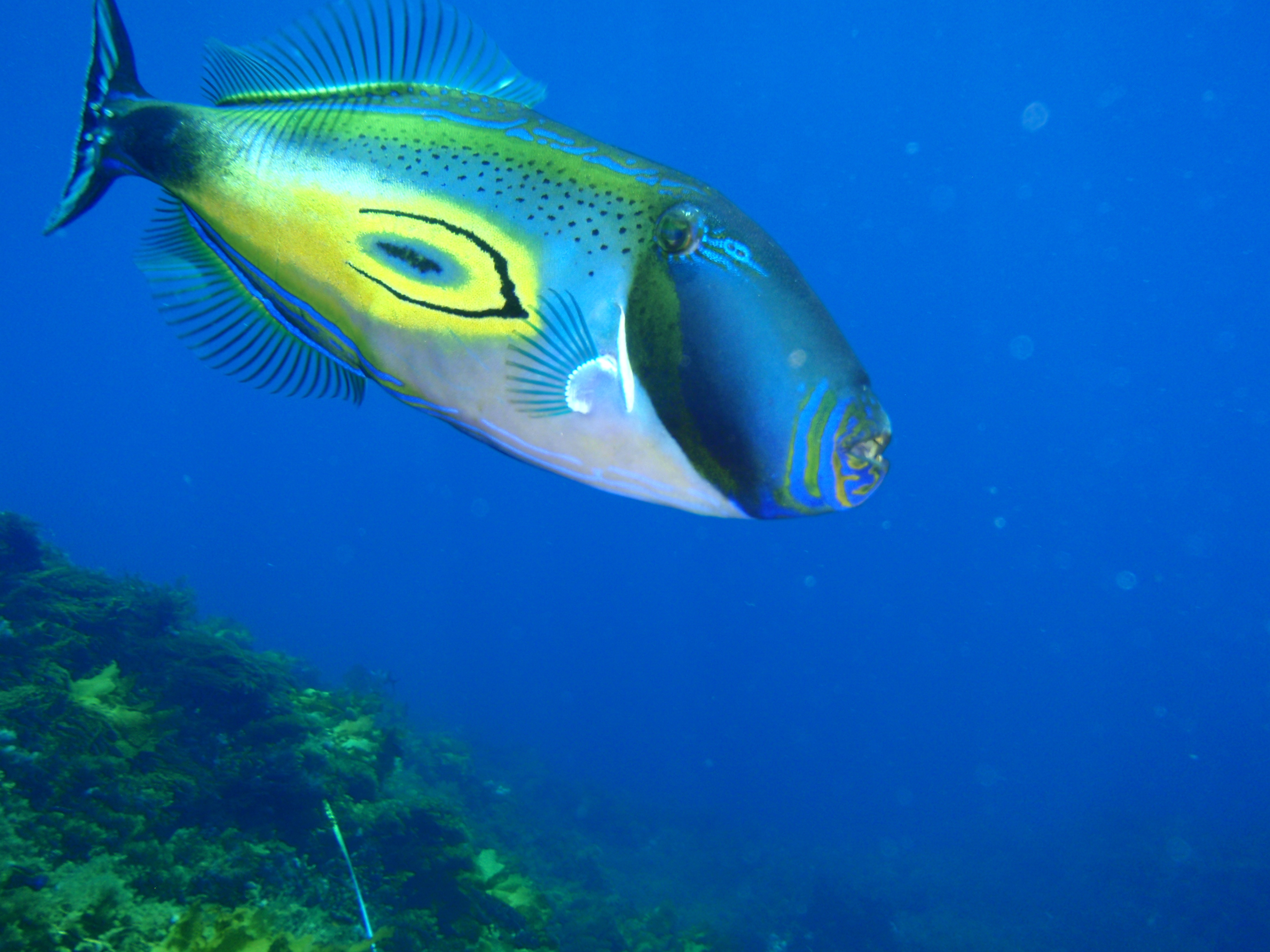
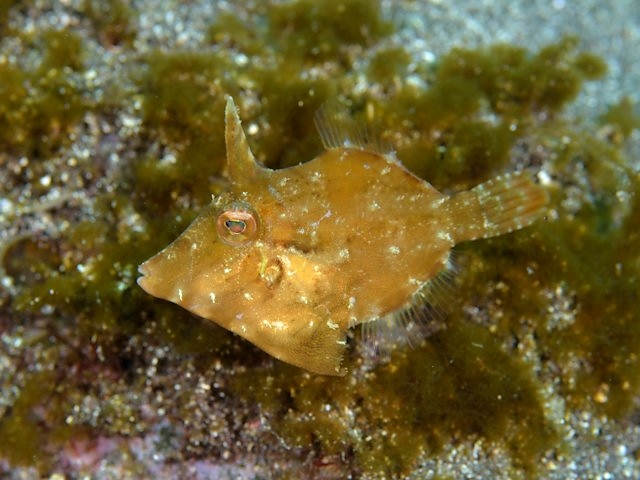
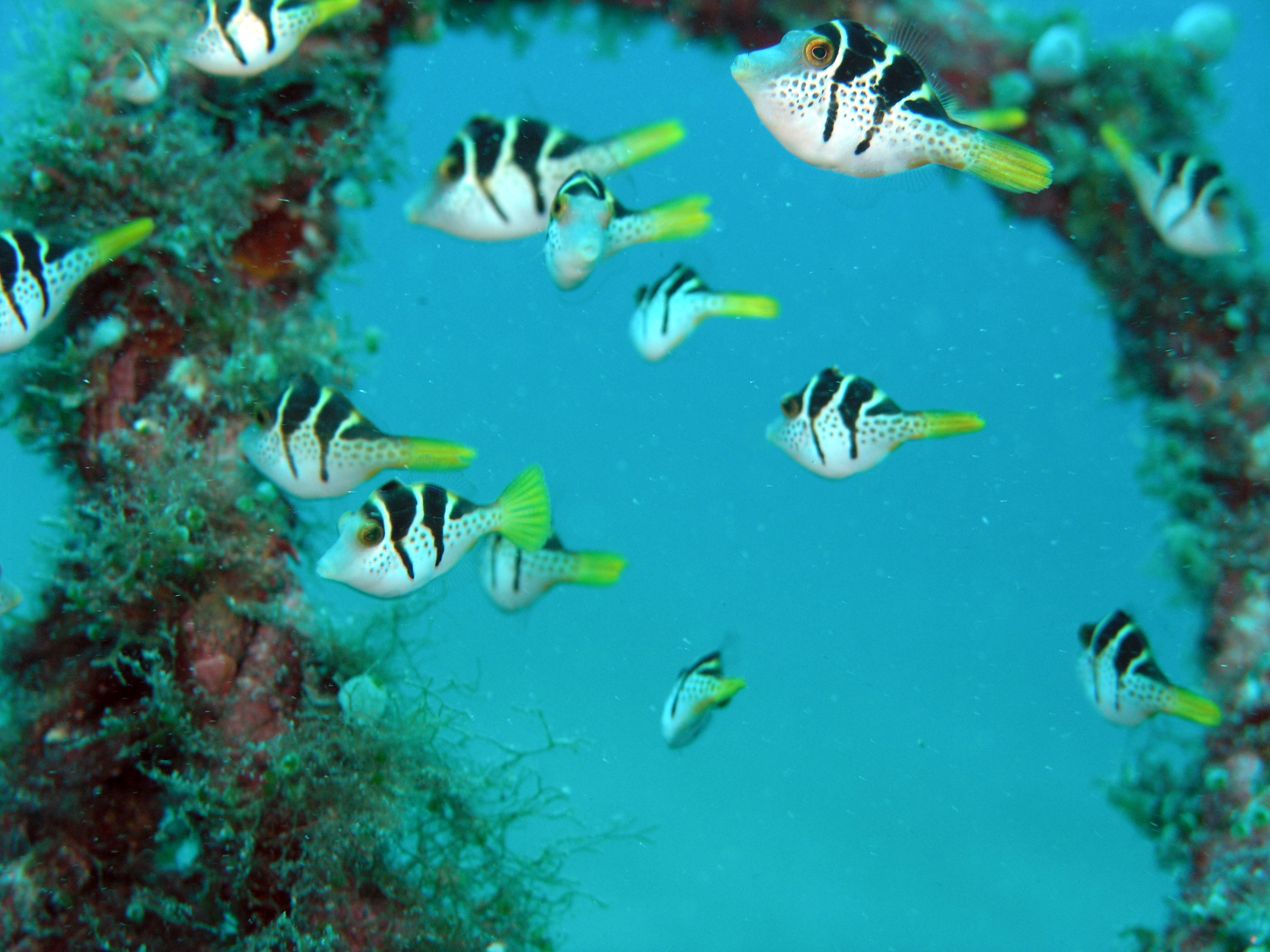
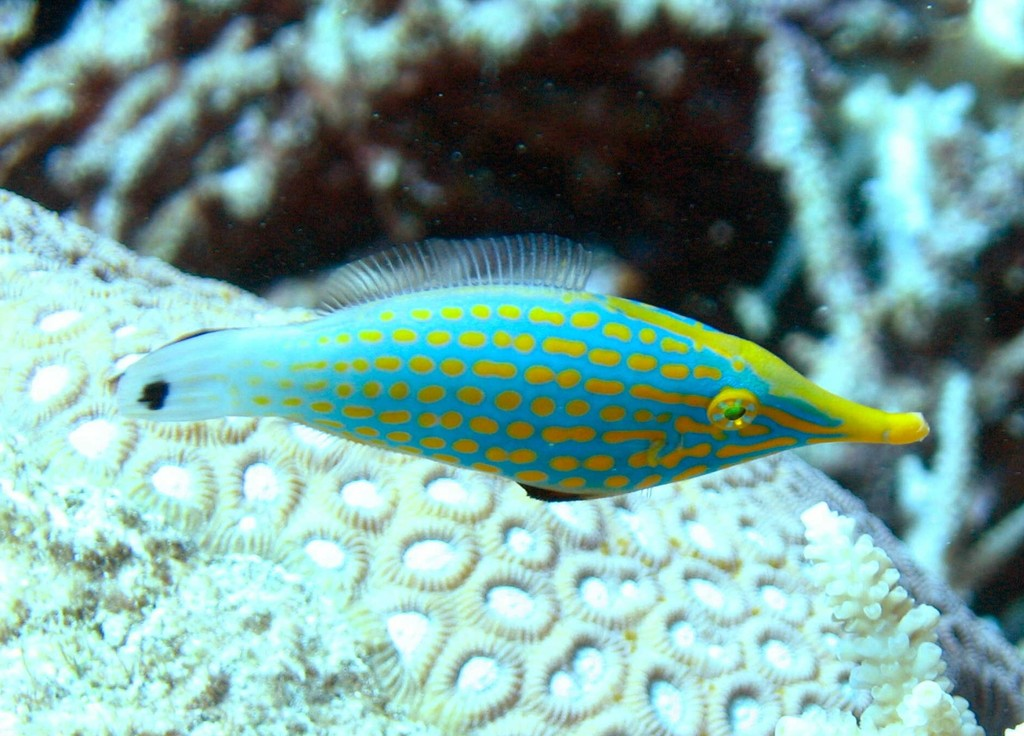
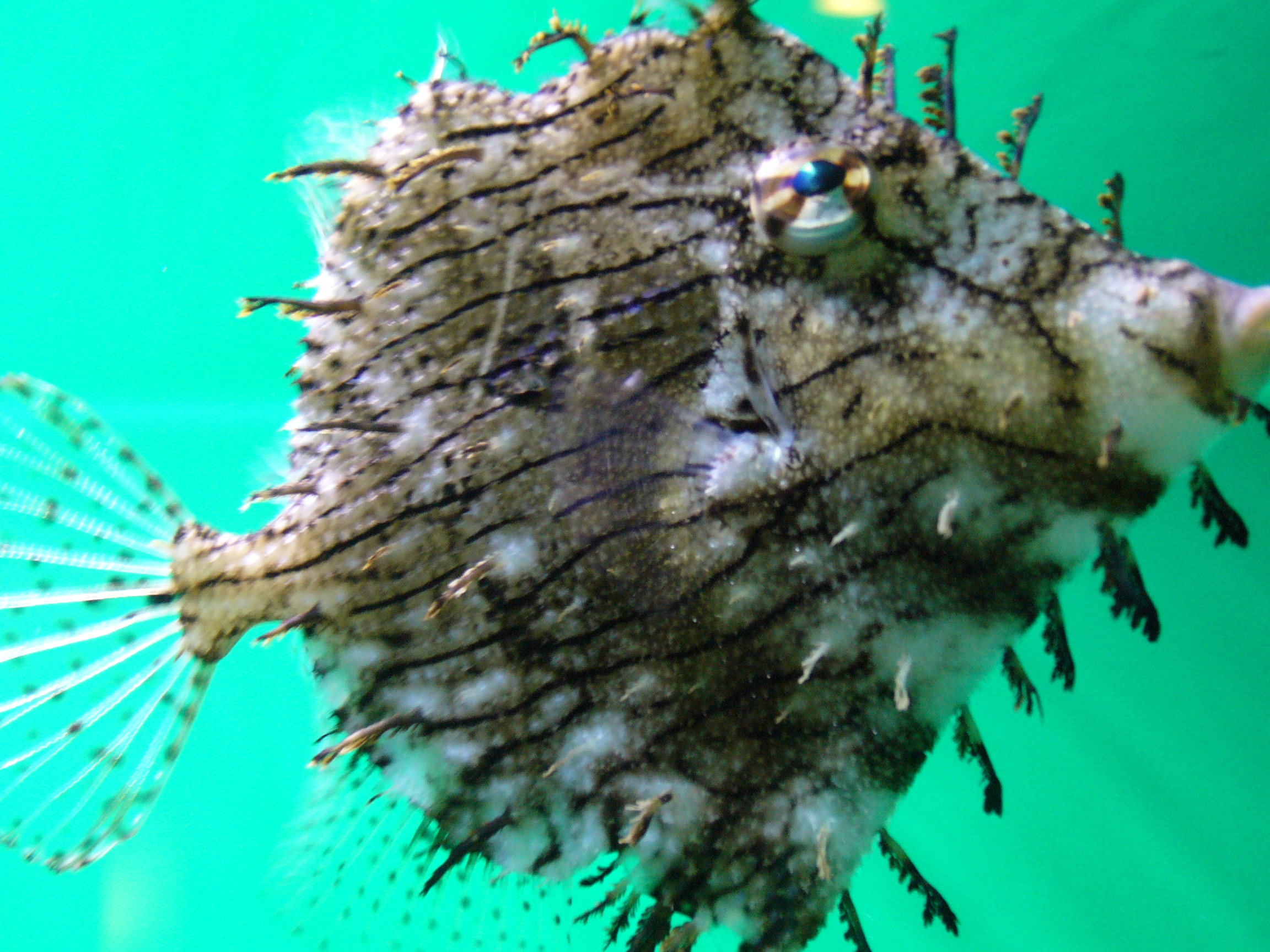
Common name	Image	Taxonomy	Reef safe	Description	Max size
Clown filefish		Cantherhines dumerili	Caution		38 cm (15.0 in)
Colored filefish		Pervagor melanocephalus	Caution		15 cm (5.9 in)
Fantail orange filefish		Pervagor spilosoma	No		18 cm (7.1 in)
Horseshoe filefish		Meuschenia hippocrepis	No		51 cm (20.1 in)
Japanese filefish		Paramonacanthus japonicus	No		13 cm (5.1 in)
Mimic filefish		Paraluteres prionurus	No		11 cm (4.3 in)
Orange spotted filefish		Oxymonacanthus longirostris	No		13 cm (5.1 in)
Tassle filefish		Chaetodermis penicilligerus	Caution		30 cm (11.8 in)

== Flatfish ==
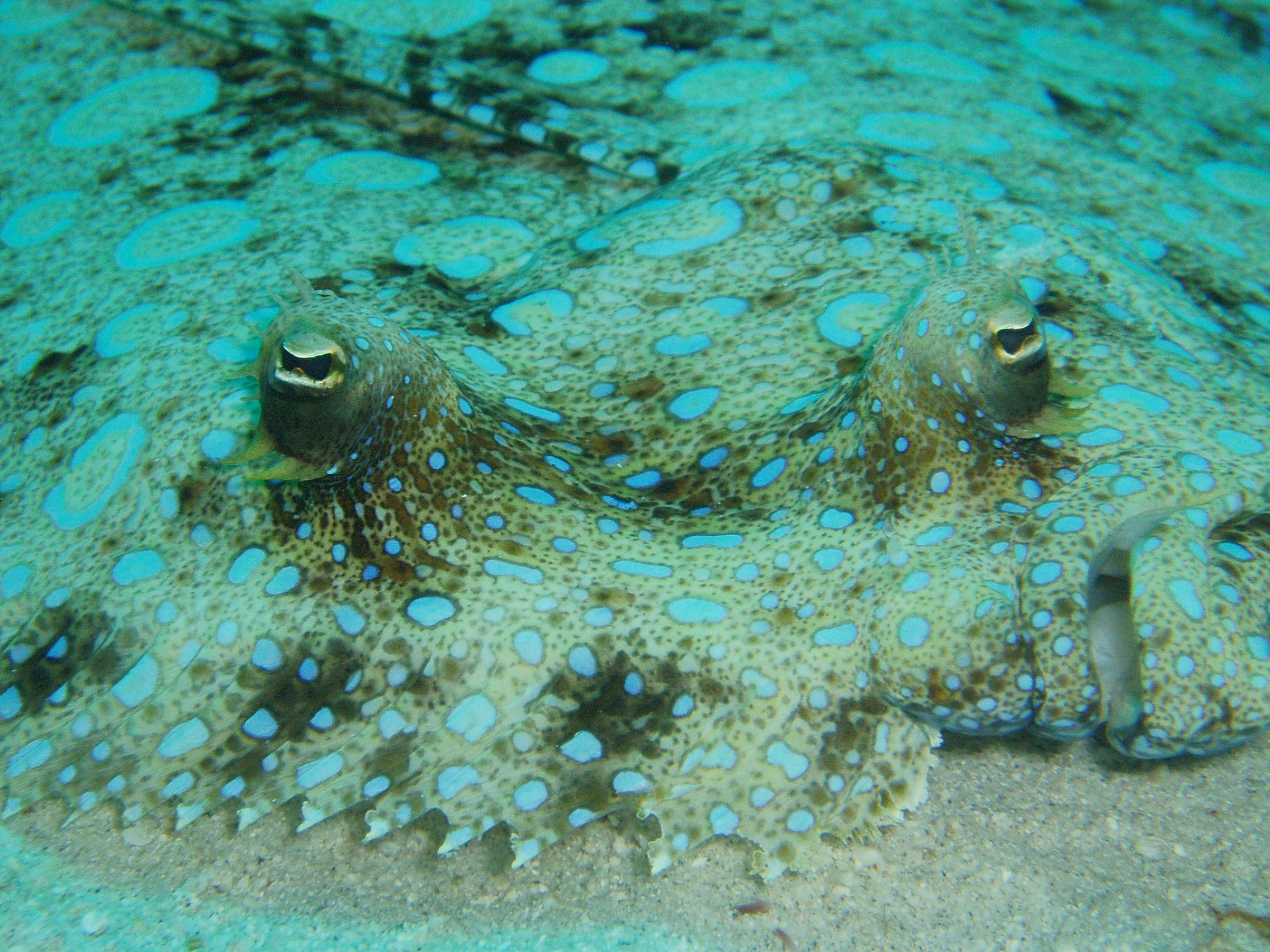
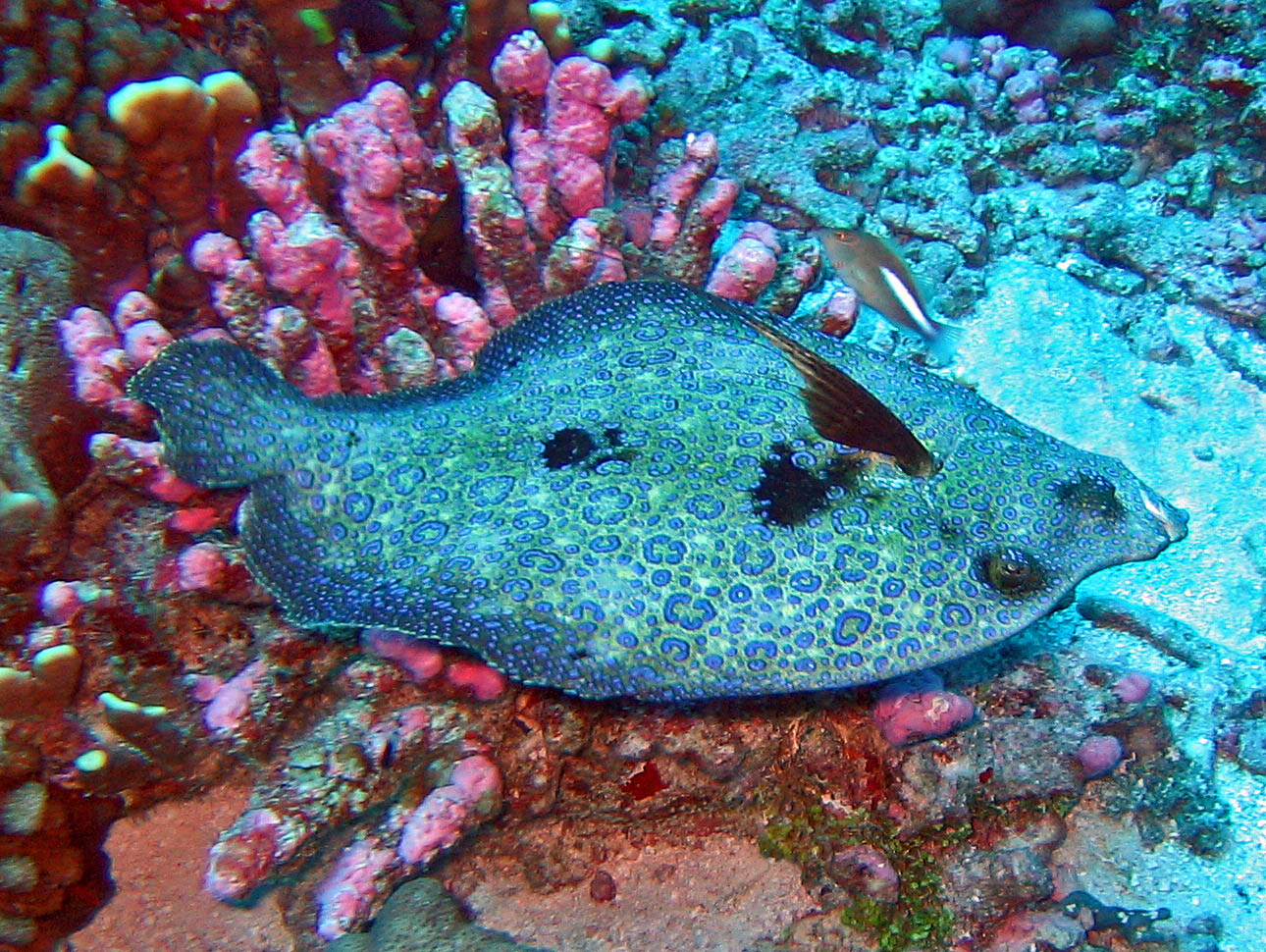
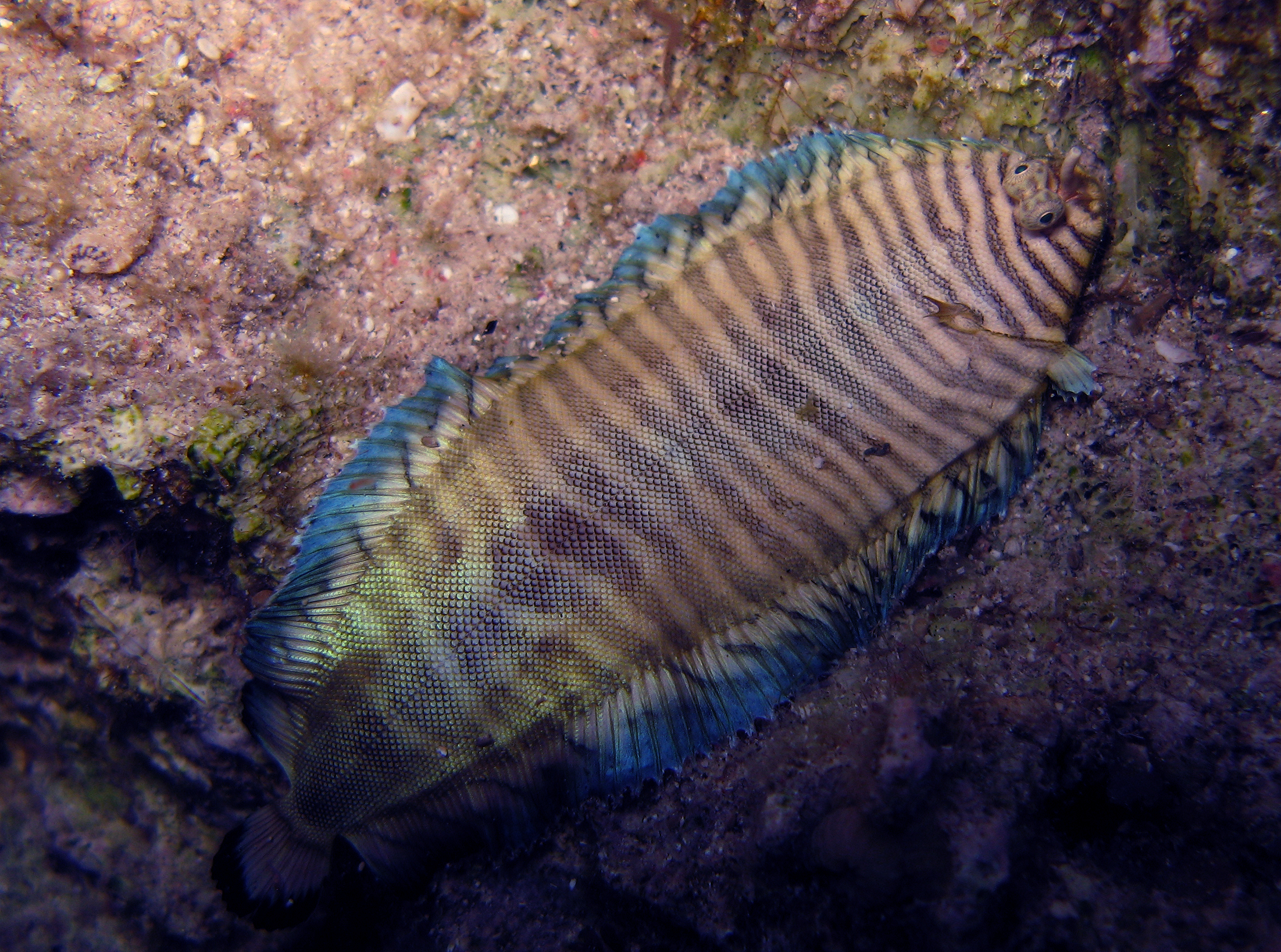
Common name	Image	Taxonomy	Reef safe	Care Level	Description	Max size
Peacock flounder		Bothus lunatus	No	Moderate		46 cm (18.1 in)
Flowery (Indo-Pacific peacock) flounder		Bothus mancus	with caution	Moderate		45 cm (17.7 in)
Banded sole		Soleichthys heterorhinos	Will eat shrimp and other invertebrates, will not harm coral	Moderate		18 cm (7.1 in)

== Frogfish ==
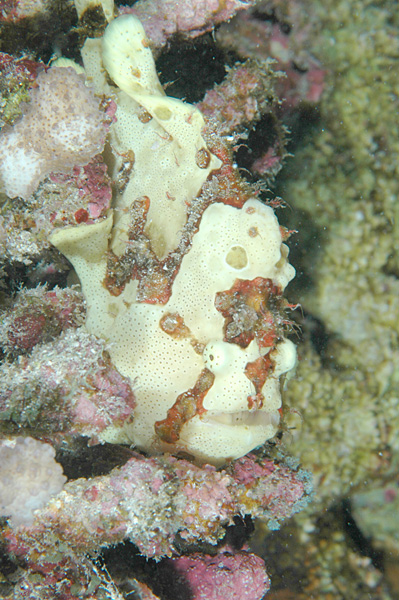
Giant frogfish

A type of Anglerfish, Frogfish are ambush predators with huge mouths. They are capable of eating fish up to twice their length so care should be taken in choosing tank mates.

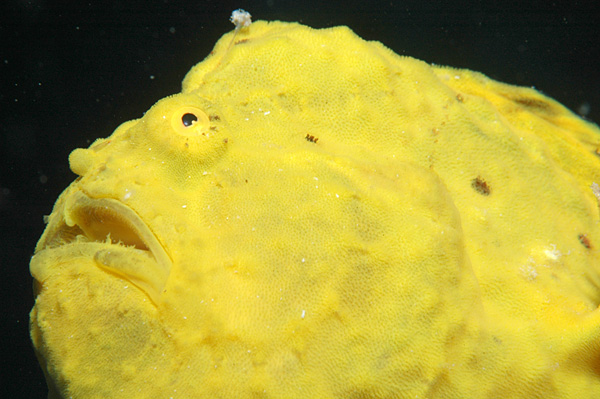
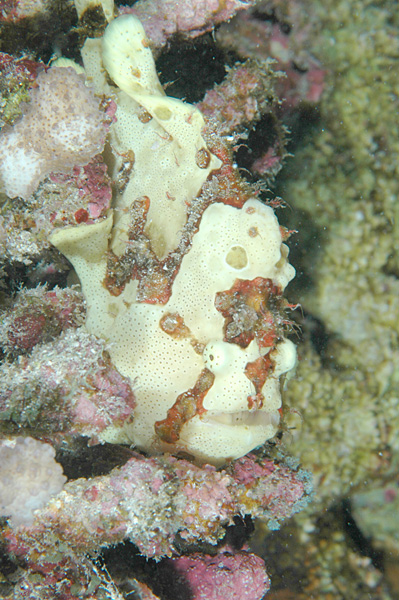
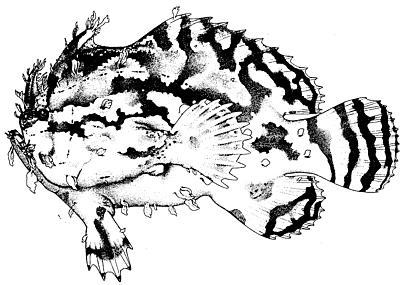
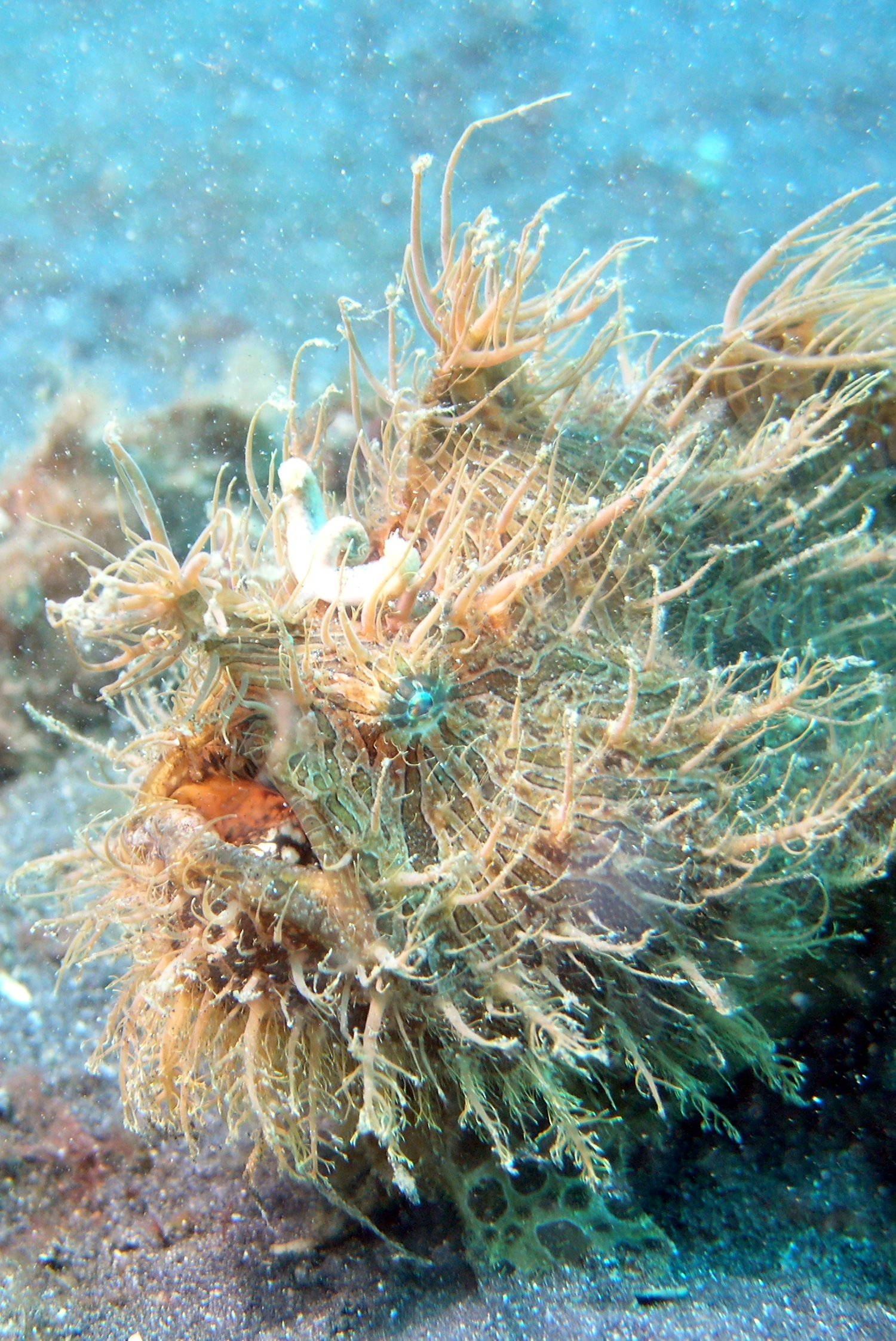
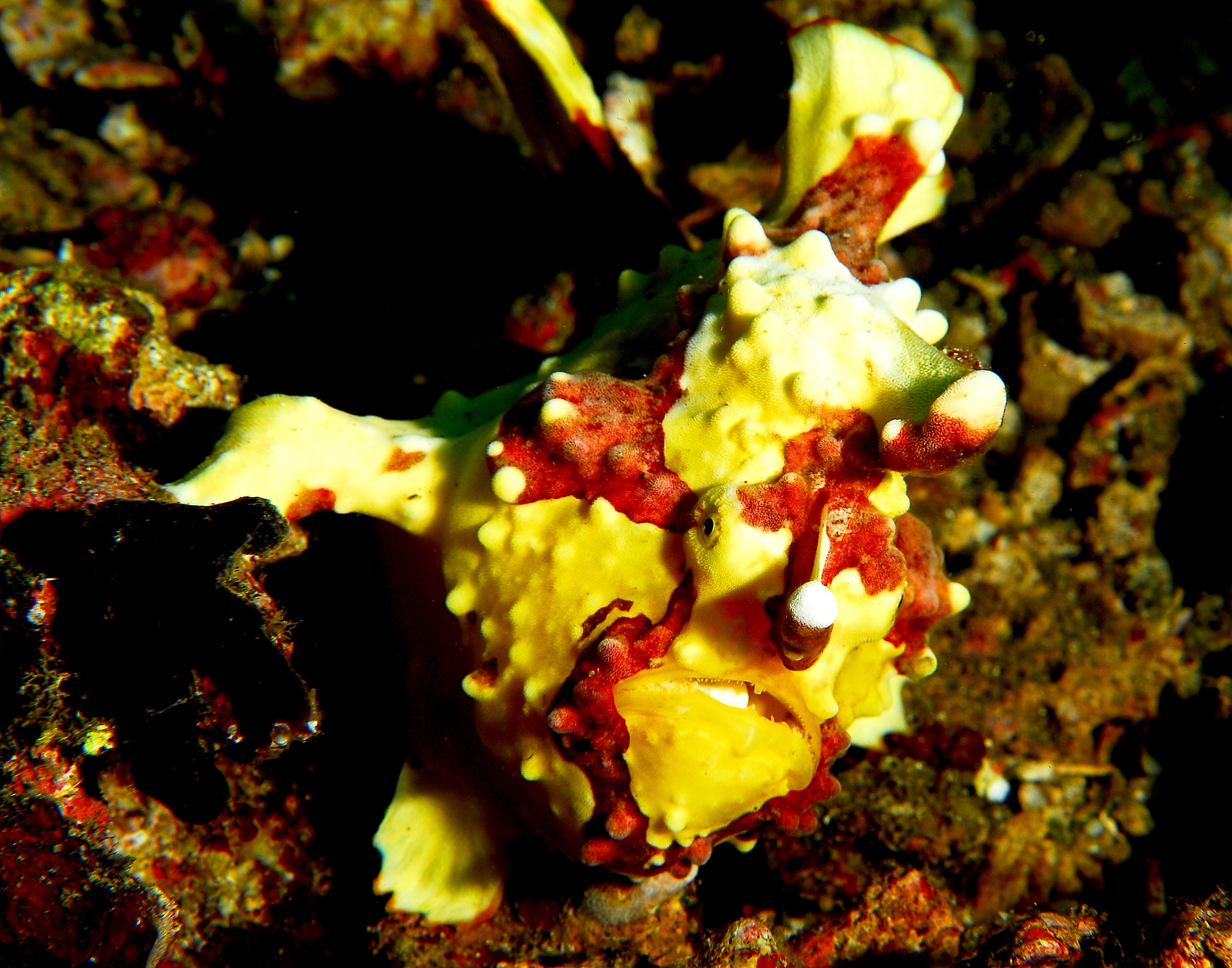
Common name	Image	Taxonomy	Reef safe	Description	Max size
Longlure frogfish		Antennarius multiocellatus	No		20 cm (7.9 in)
Giant anglerfish		Antennarius commerson	No		38 cm (15.0 in)
Sargassum frogfish		Histrio histrio	No		20 cm (7.9 in)
Striated frogfish		Antennarius striatus	No		15 cm (5.9 in)
Wartskin frogfish		Antennarius maculatus	No	Has the ability to change color to match its surrounding.	10 cm (3.9 in)

== Goatfish ==
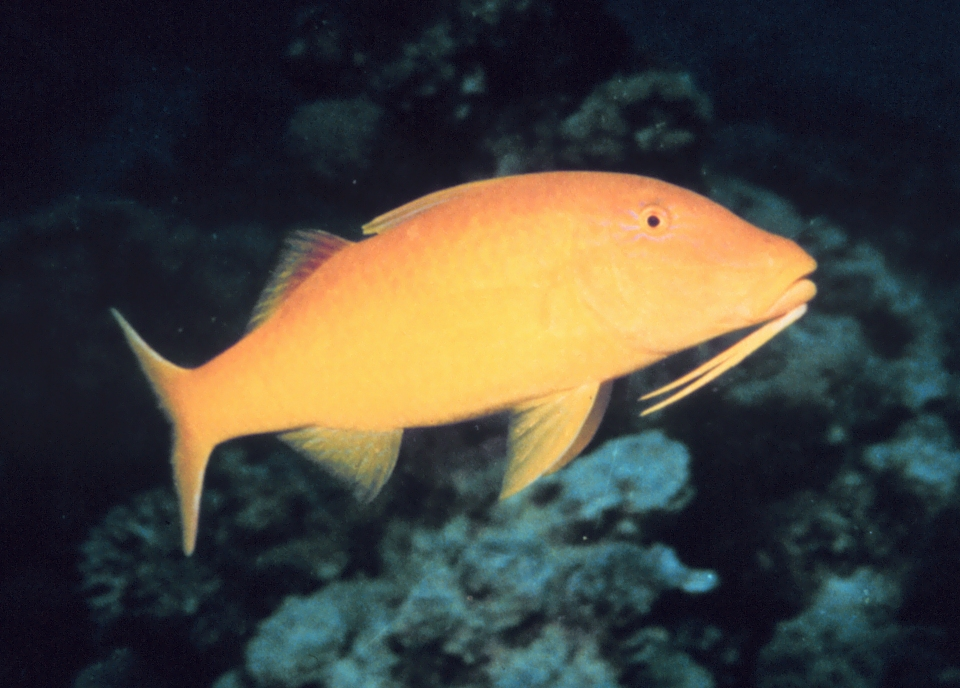
Yellow goatfish

While not as common a choice for aquariums as many other species, they are typically hardy and brightly colored

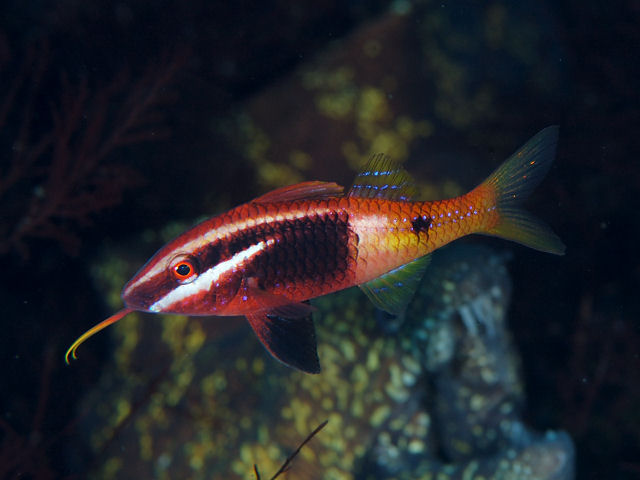
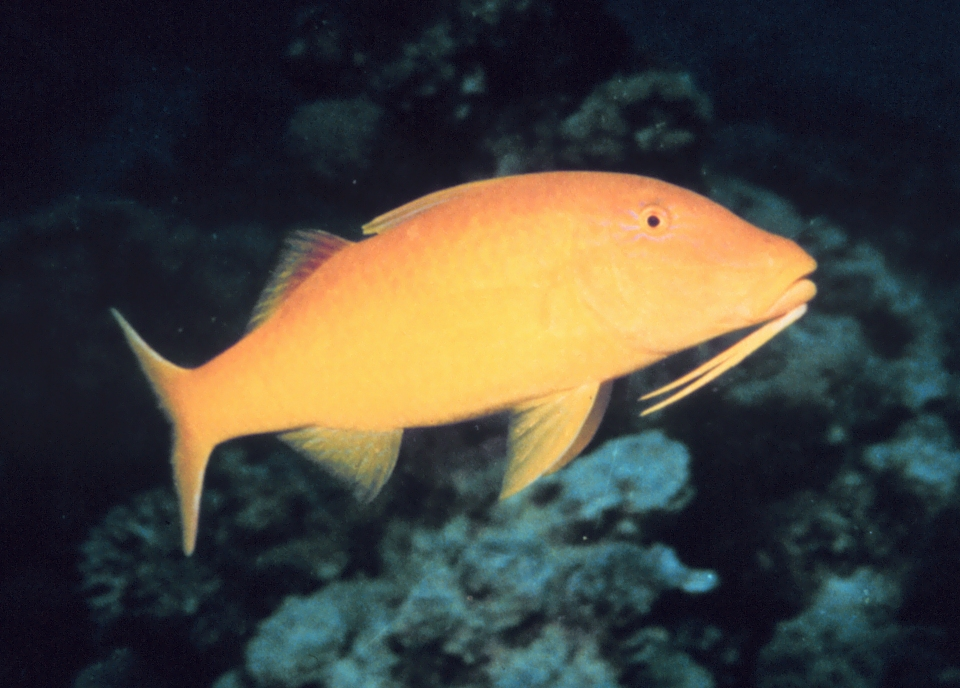
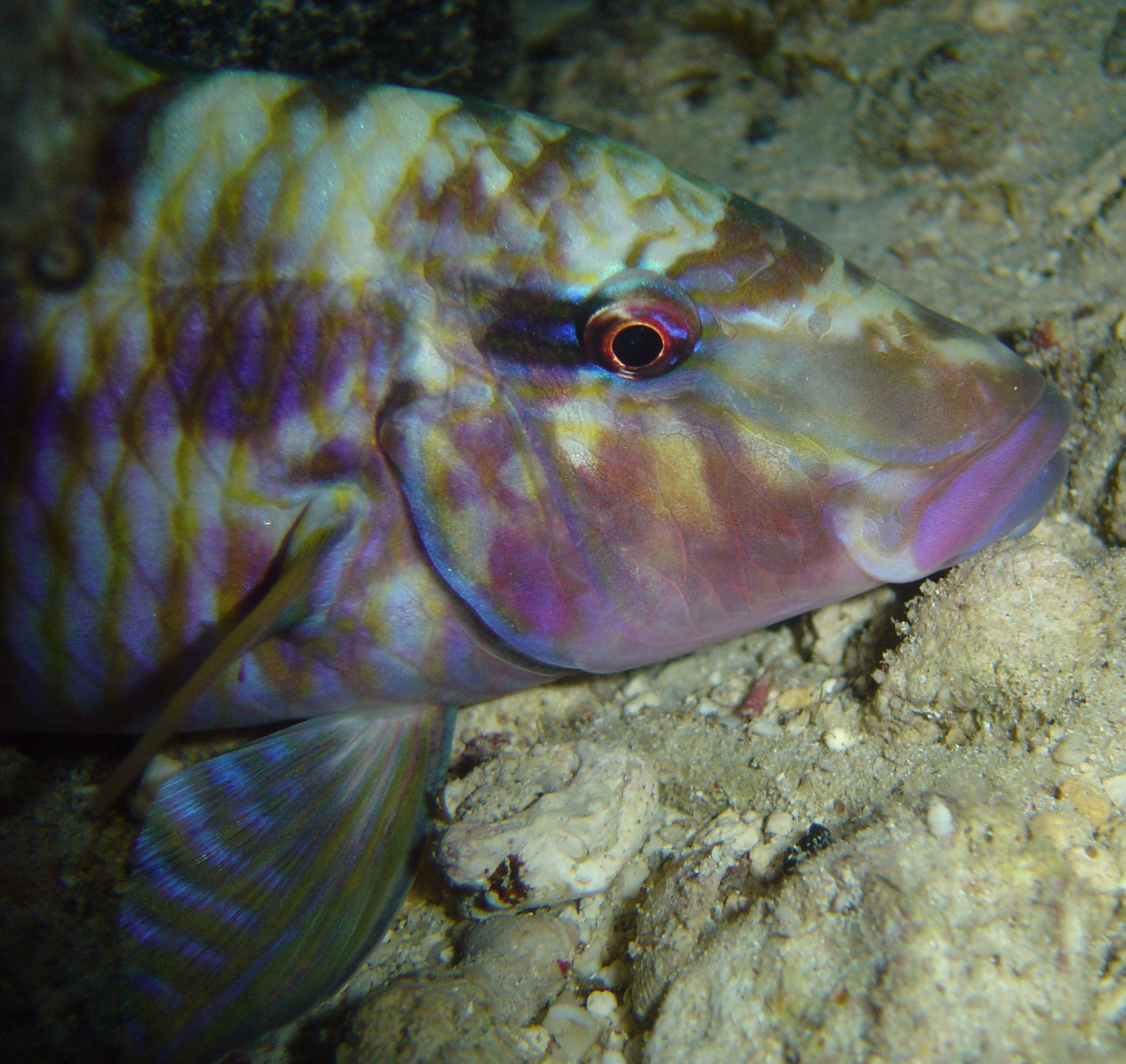
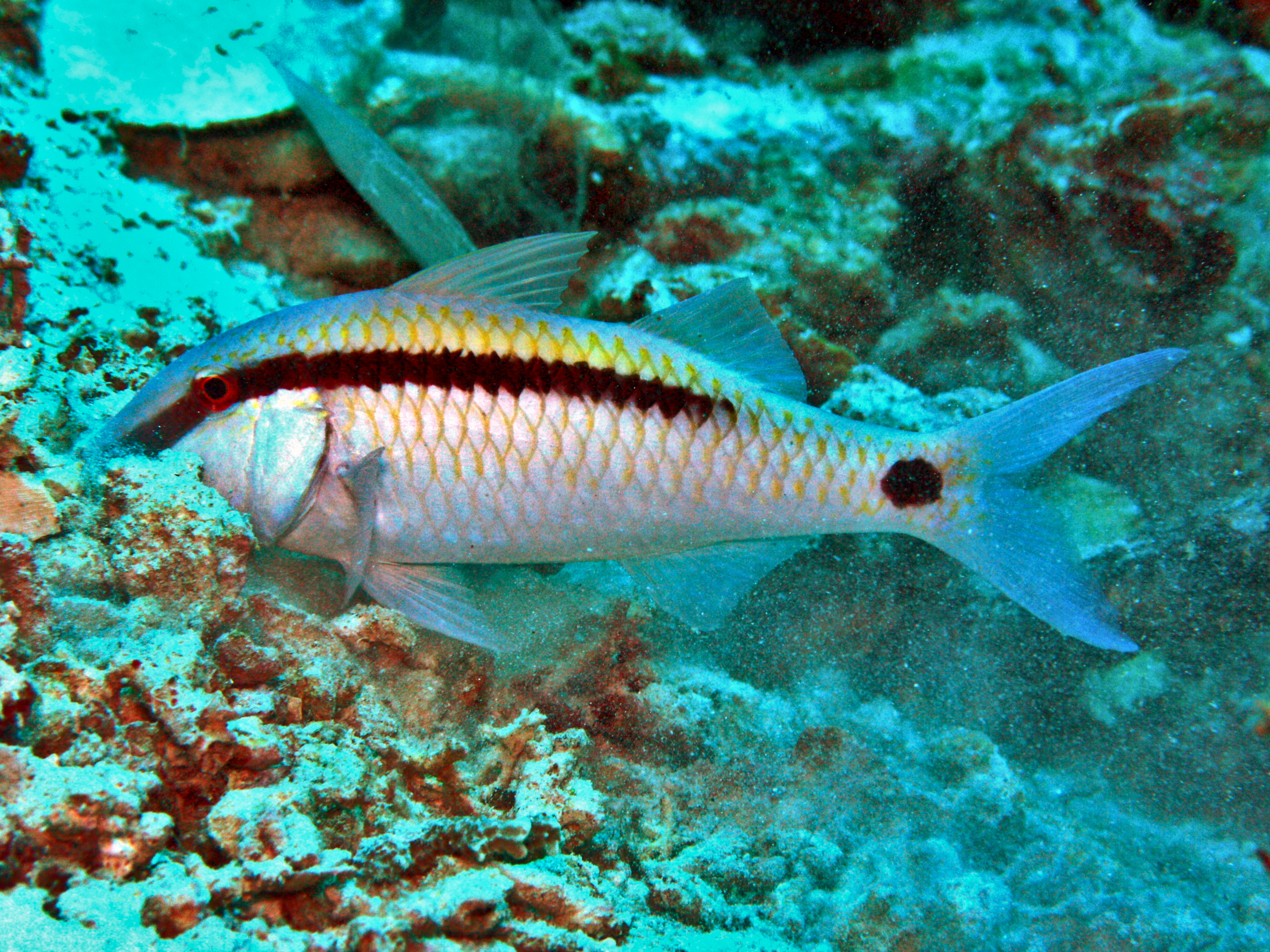
Common name	Image	Taxonomy	Reef safe	Description	Max size
Bicolor goatfish		Parupeneus barberinoides	With Caution		25 cm (9.8 in)
Goldsaddle goatfish		Parupeneus cyclostomus	With Caution		51 cm (20.1 in)
Manybar goatfish		Parupeneus multifasciatus	With Caution		30 cm (11.8 in)
Yellow back goatfish		Parupeneus barberinus	With Caution		41 cm (16.1 in)

== Gobies and clingfishes ==
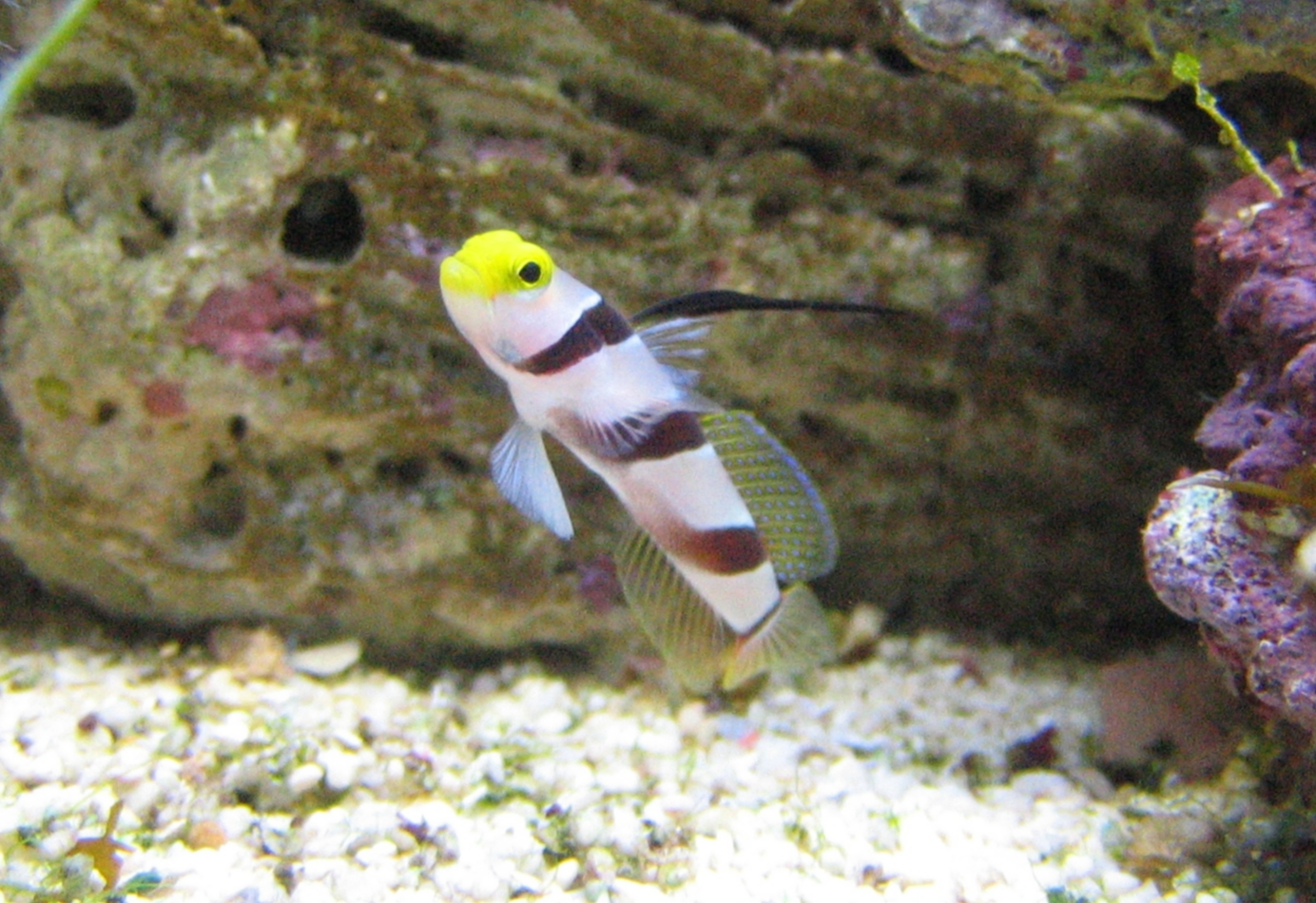
Black-ray goby

Are typically hardy and do not harm invertebrates which makes them a good choice of fish for a reef tank.

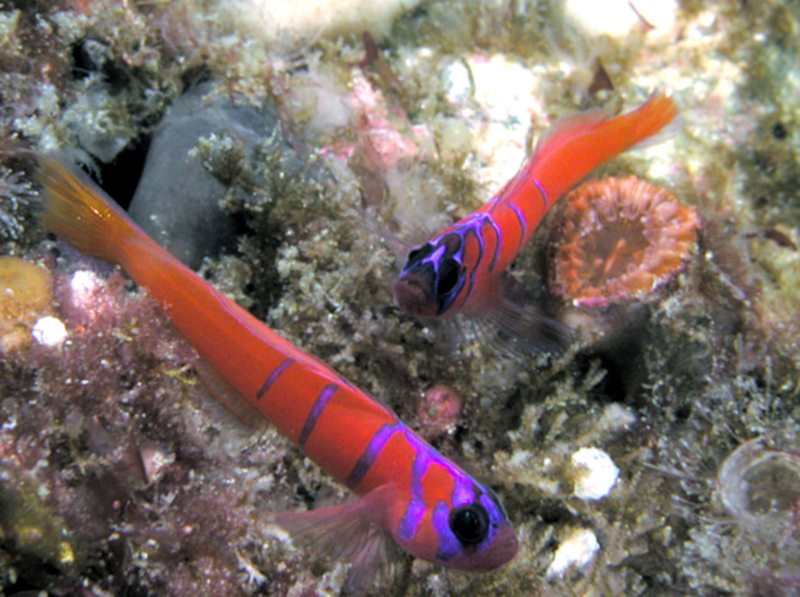
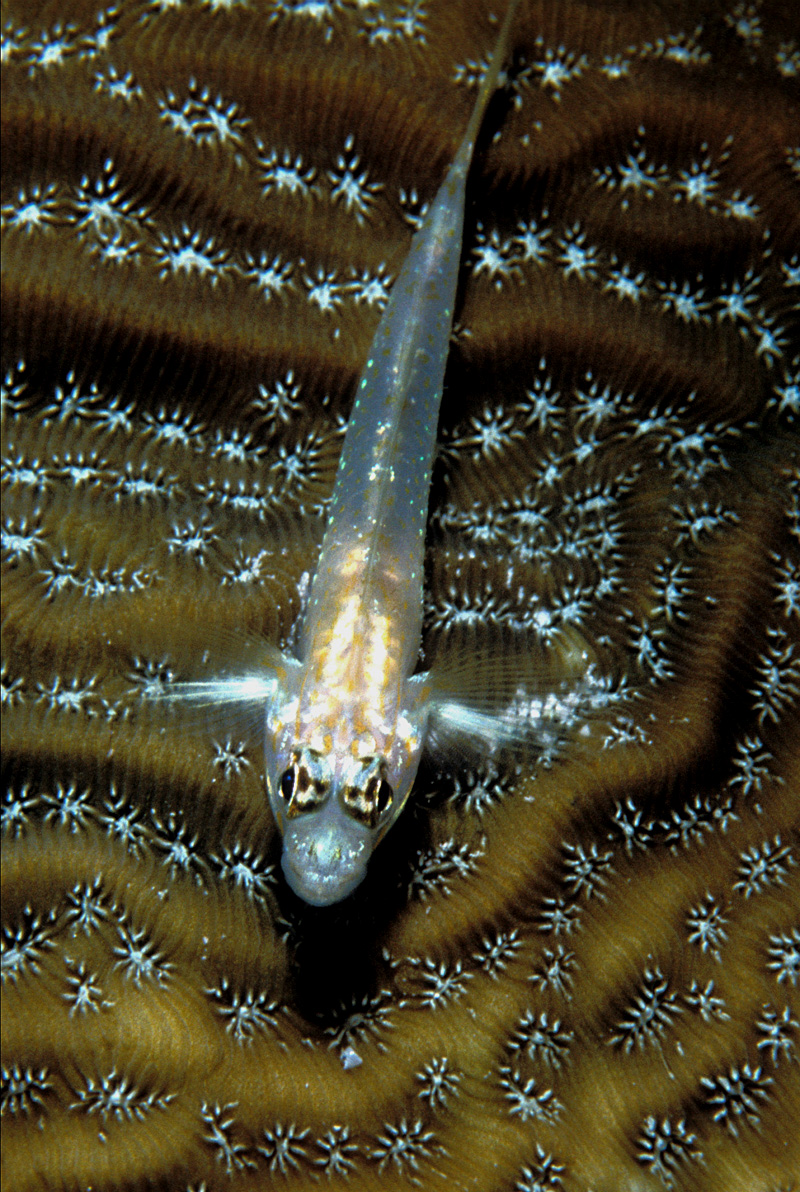
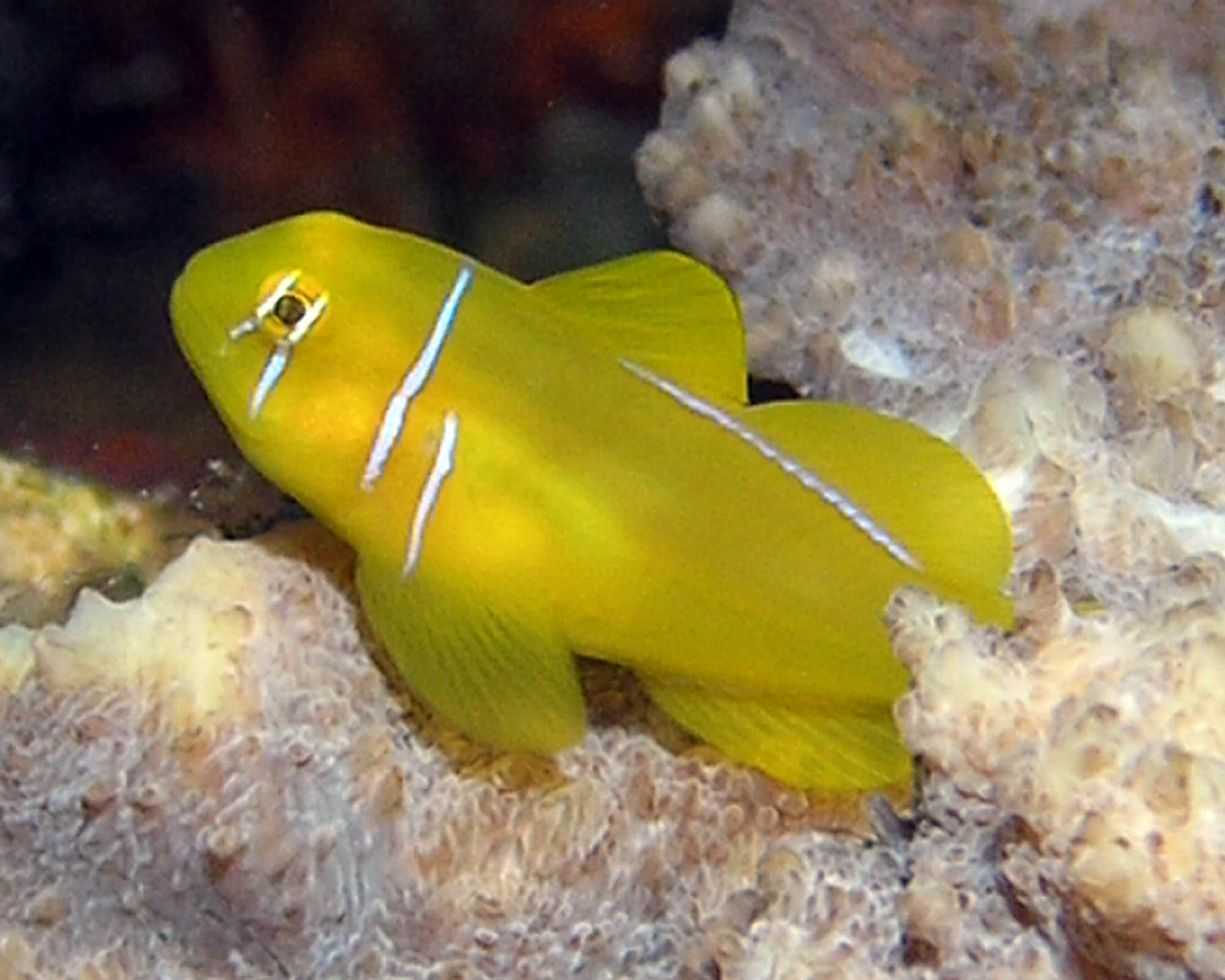
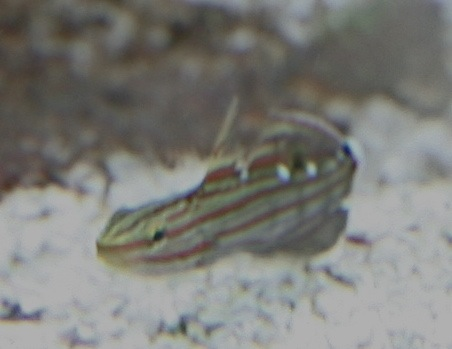
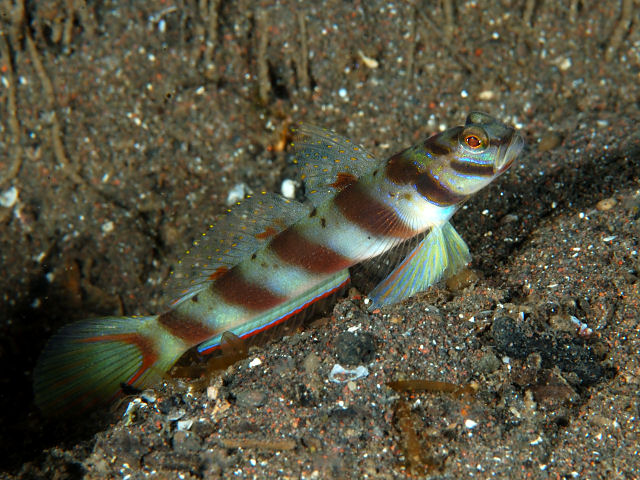
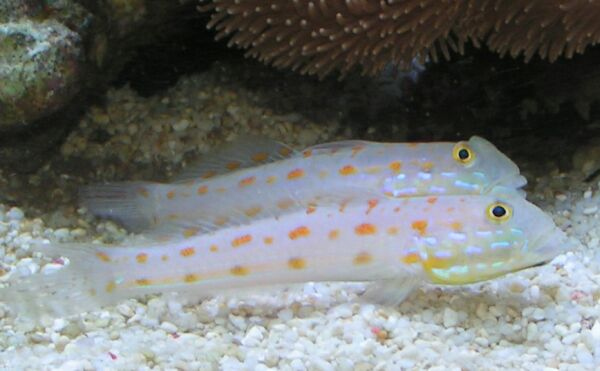
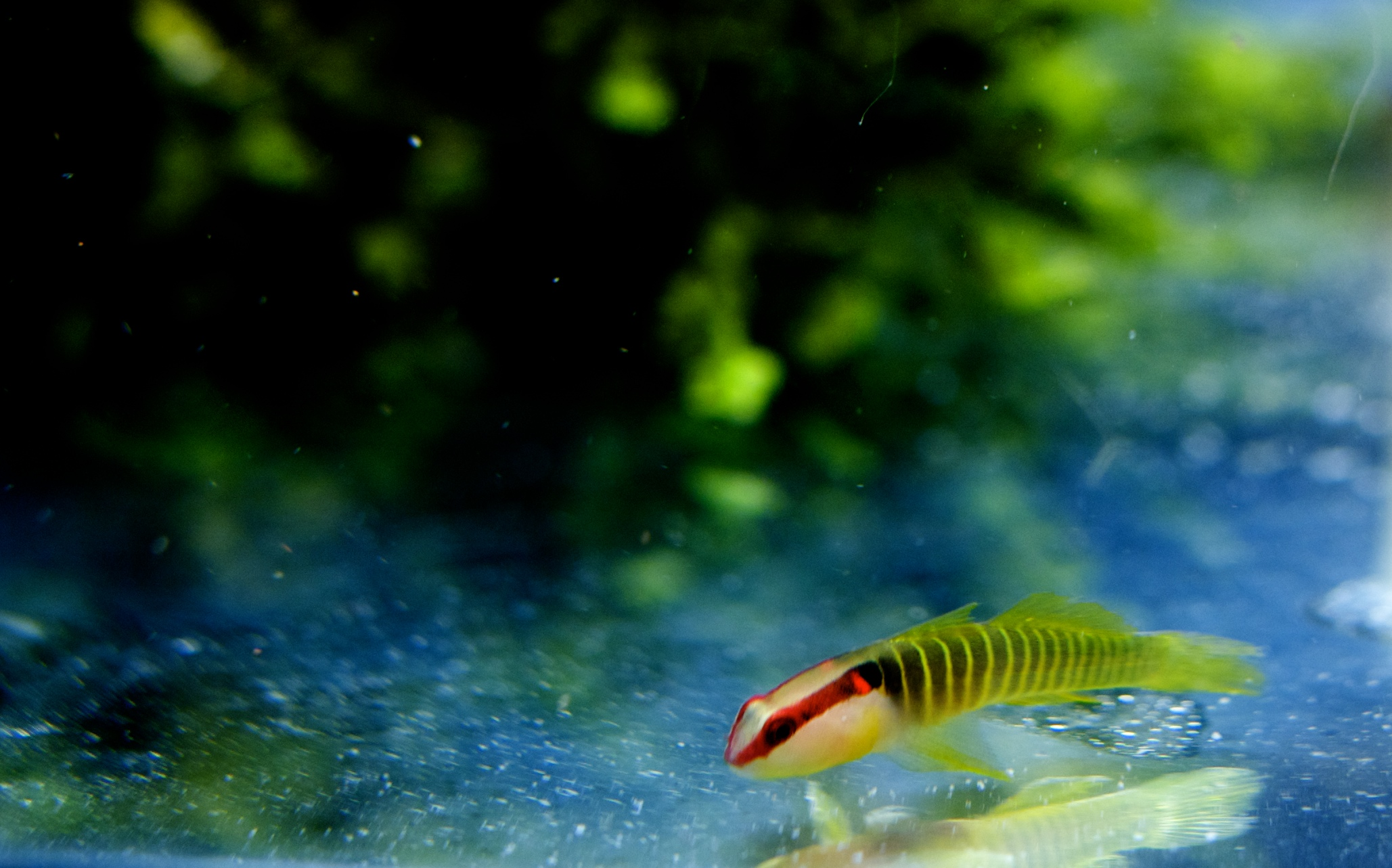
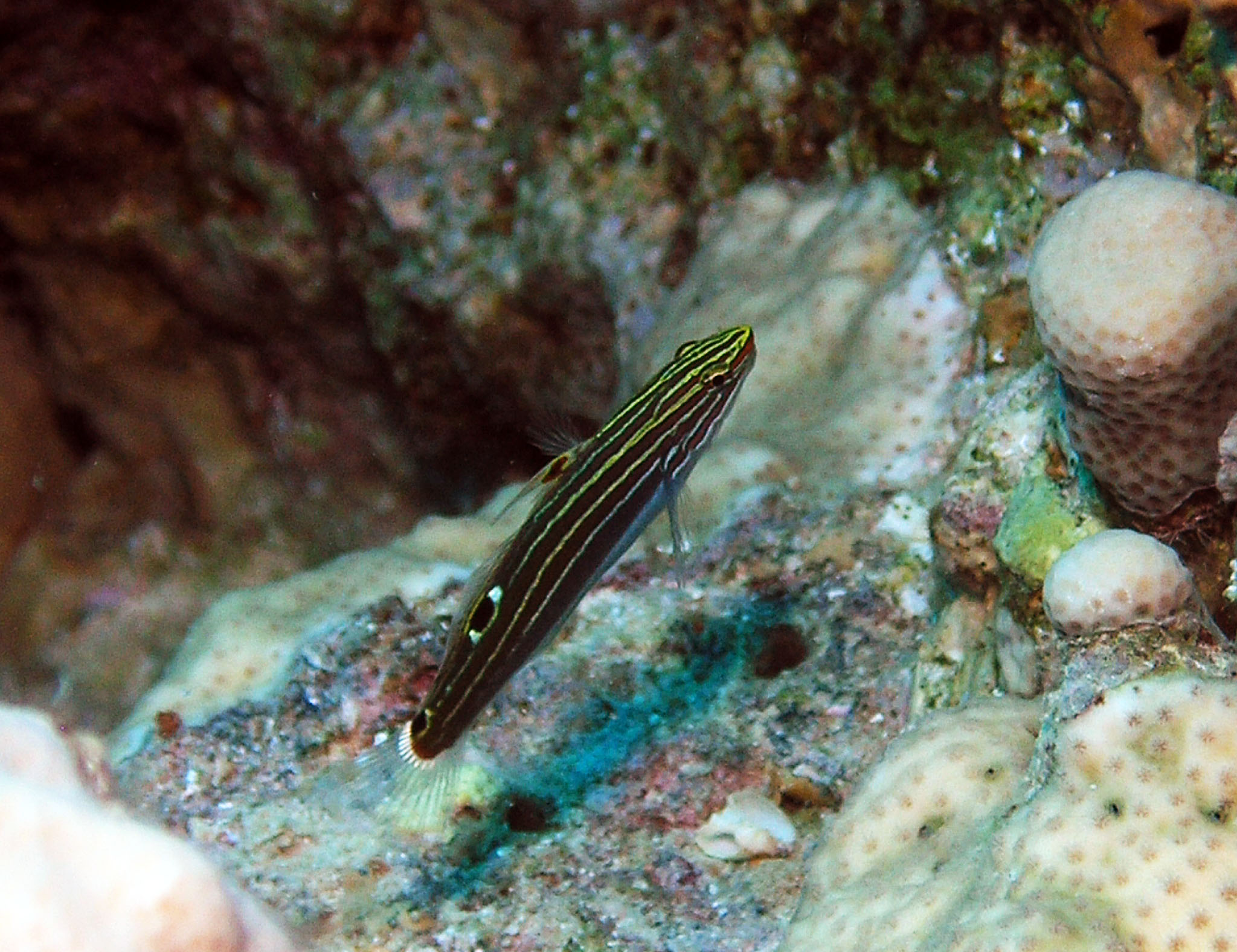
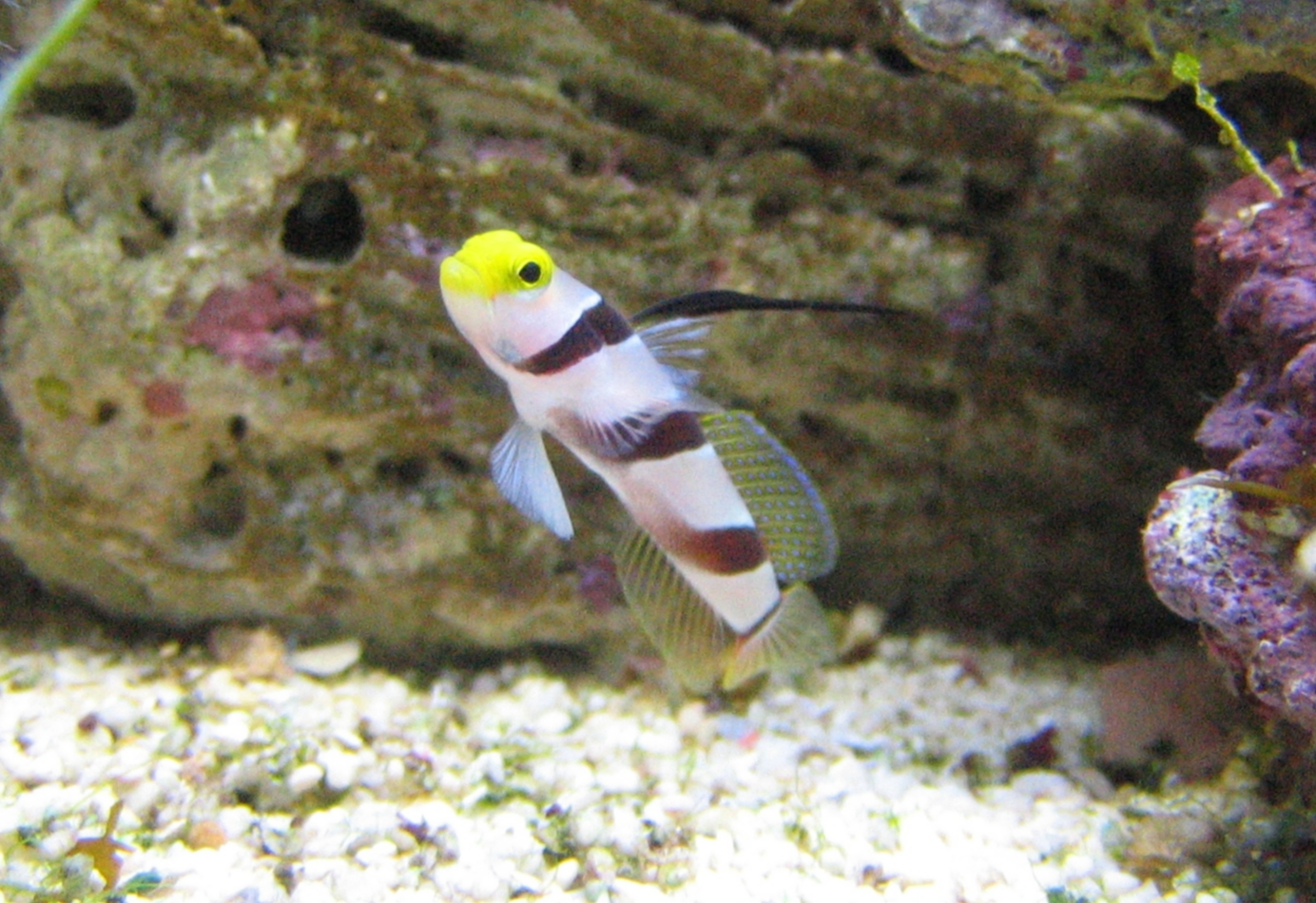
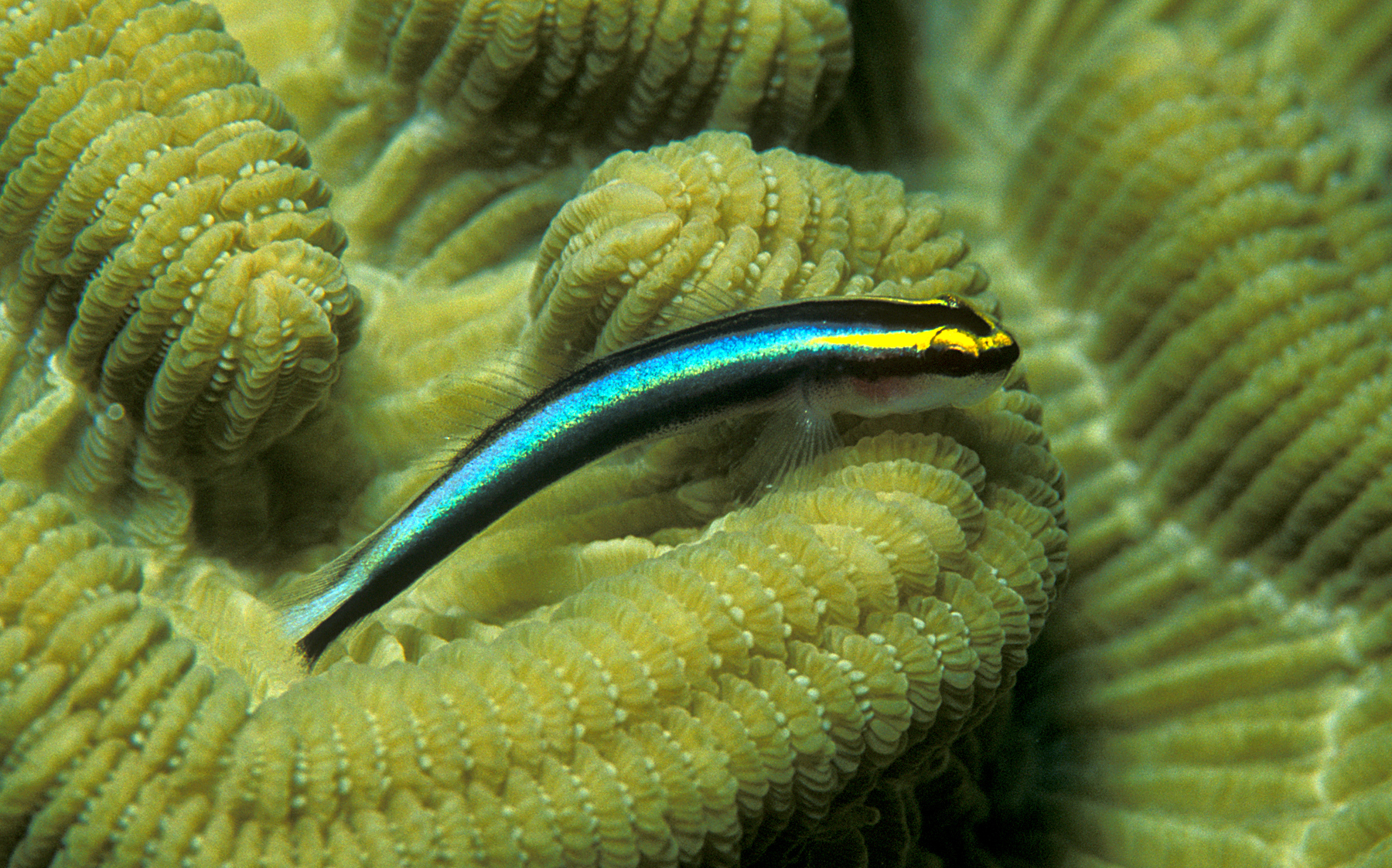
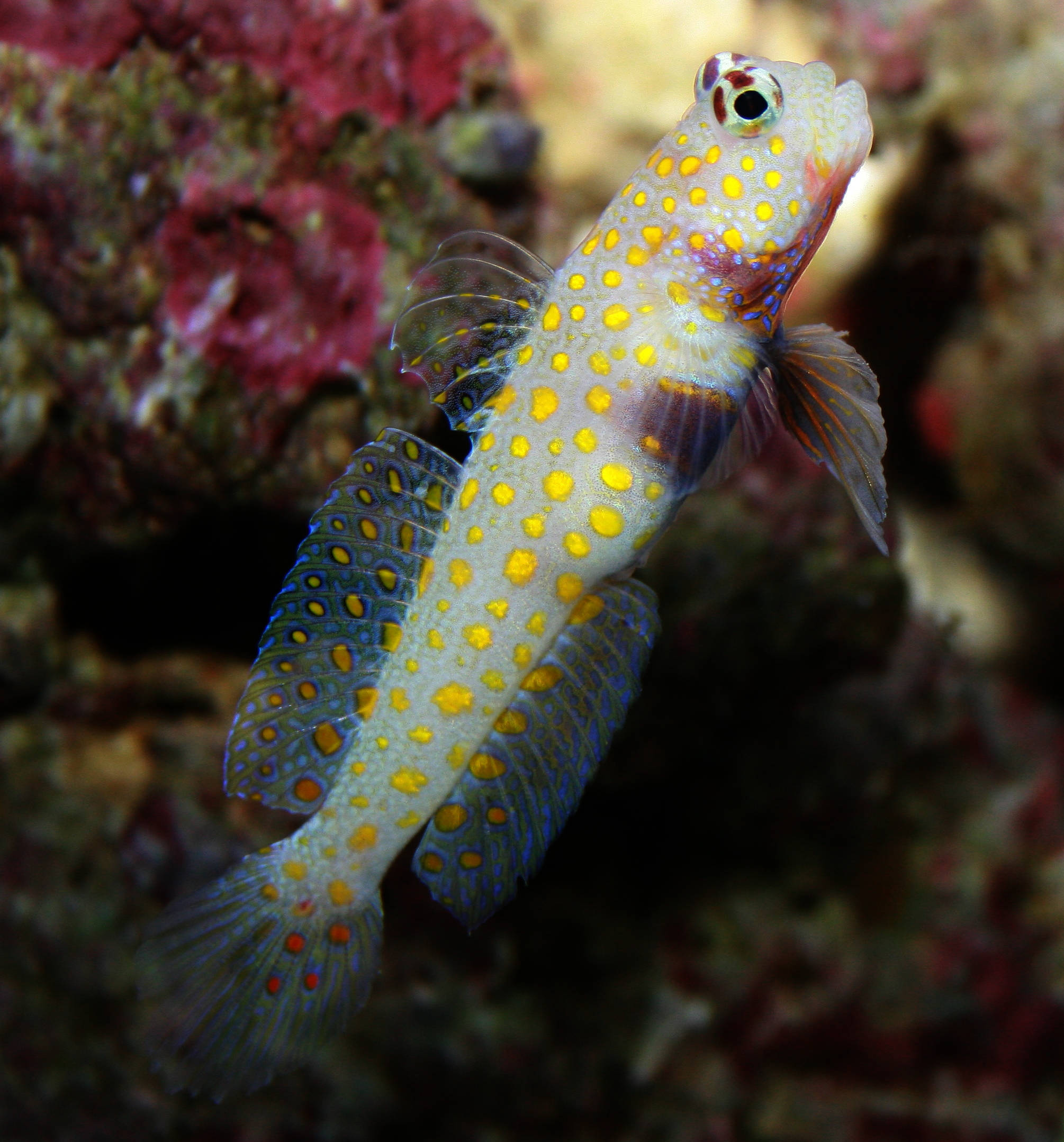
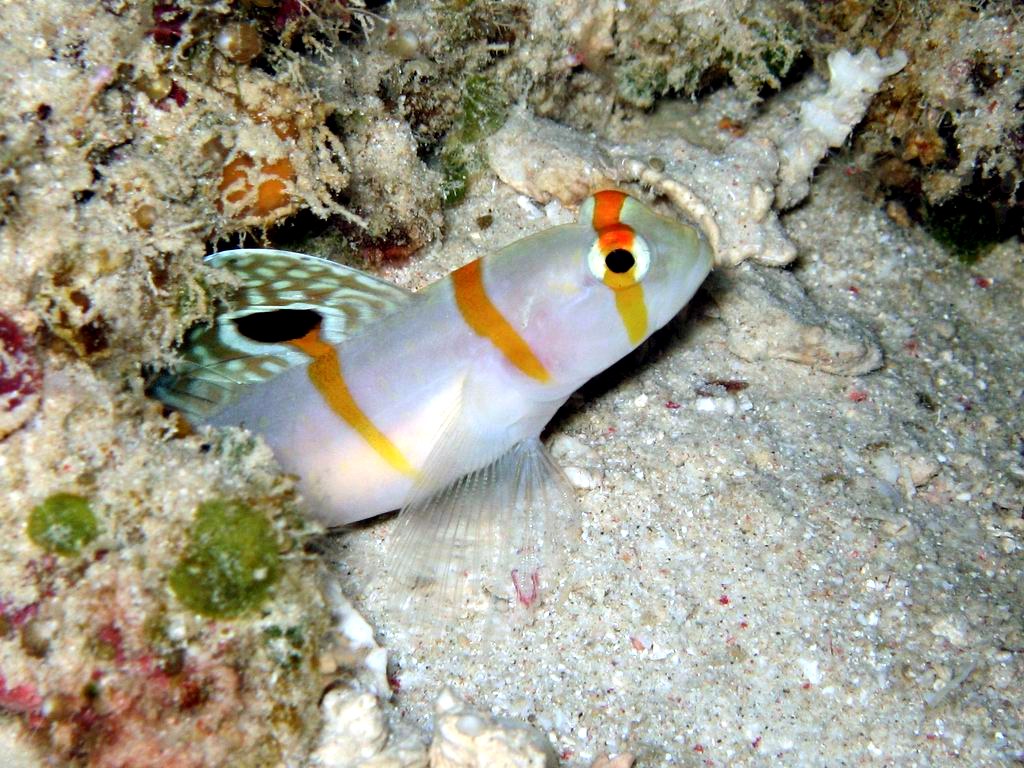
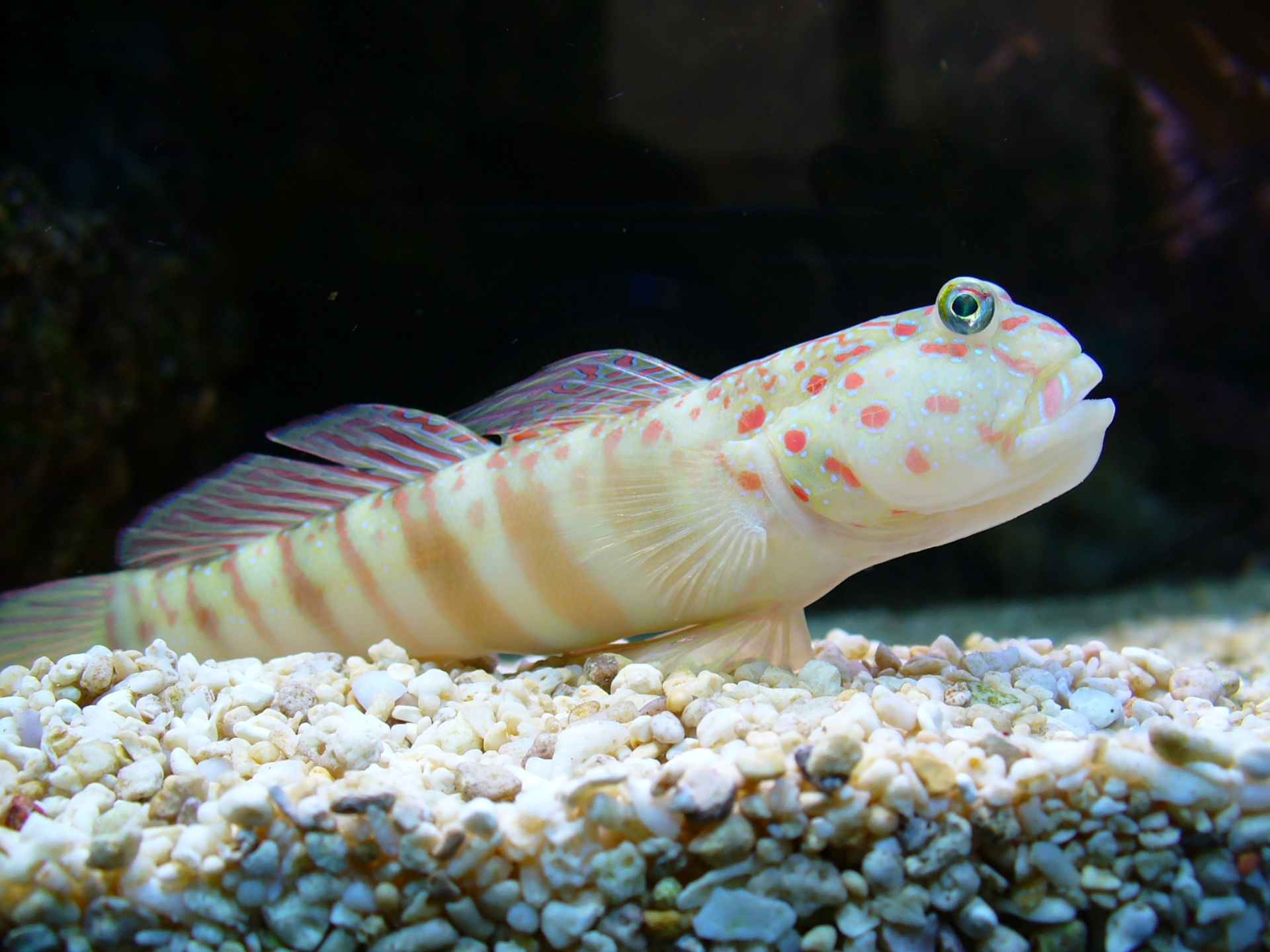
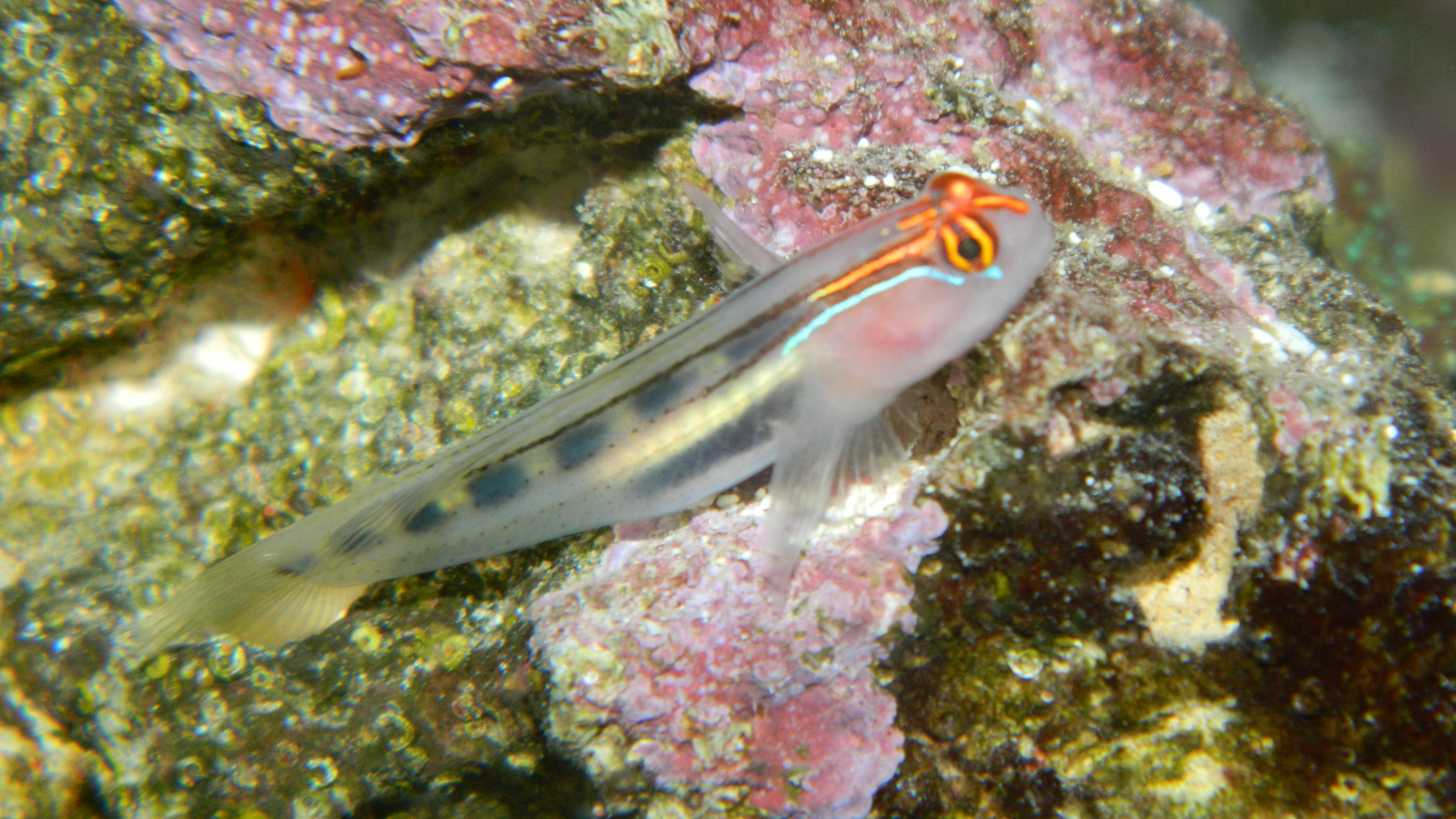
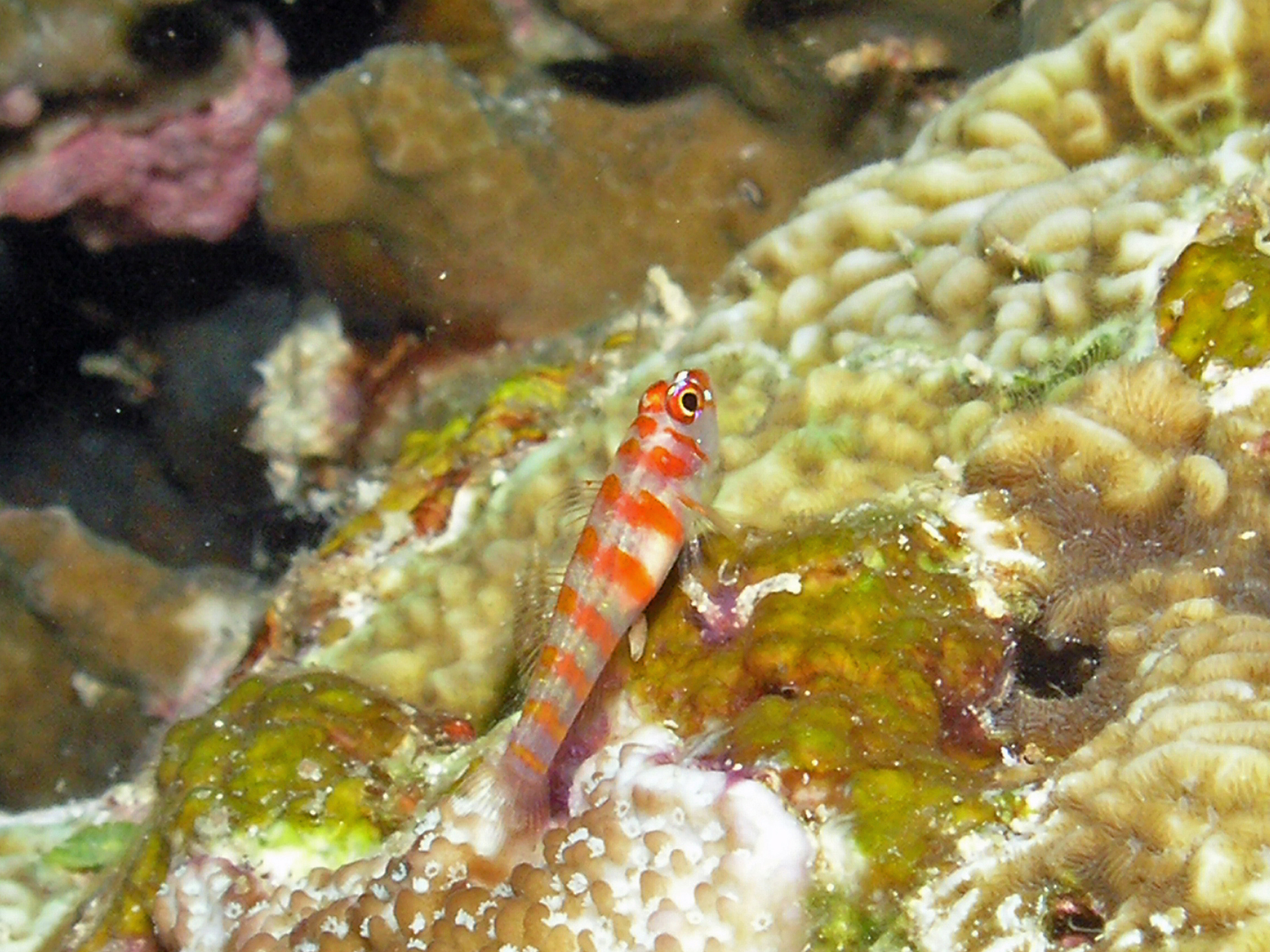
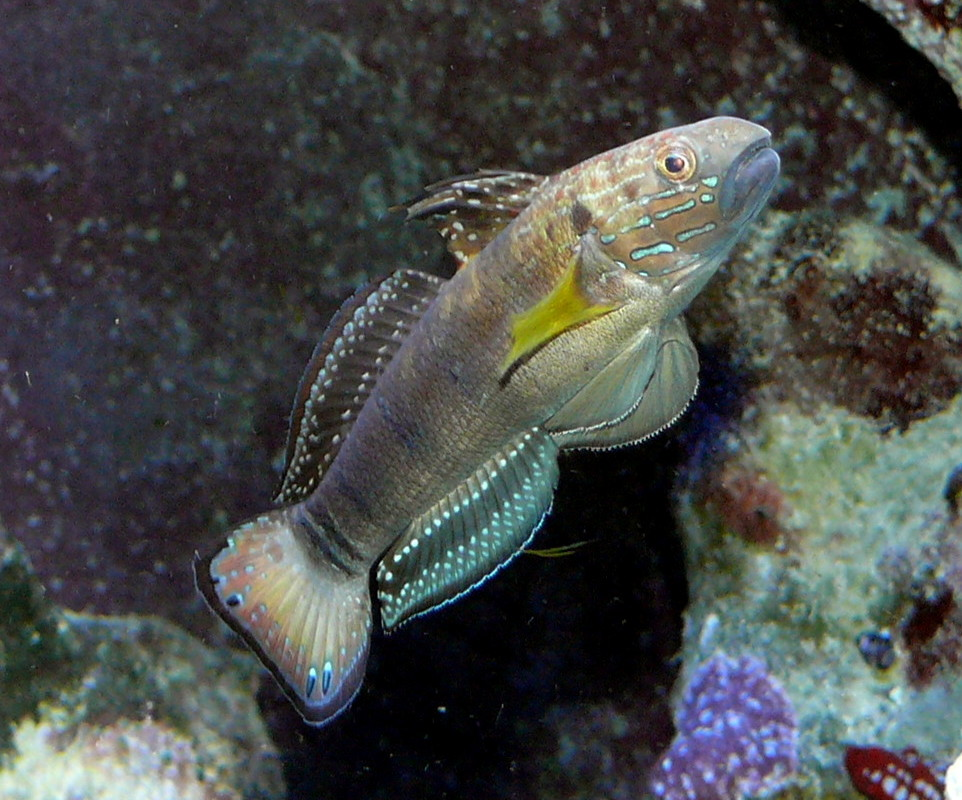
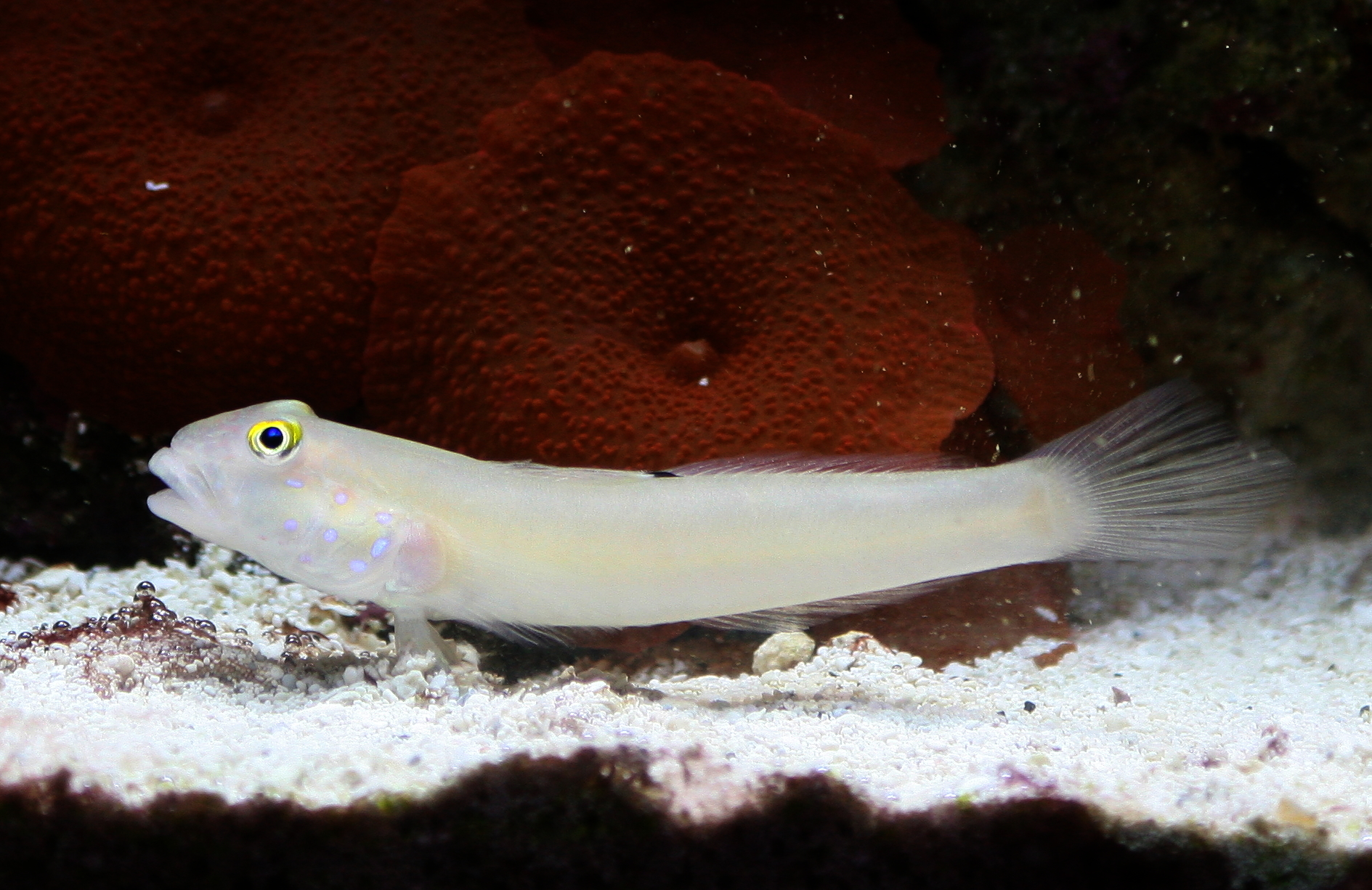
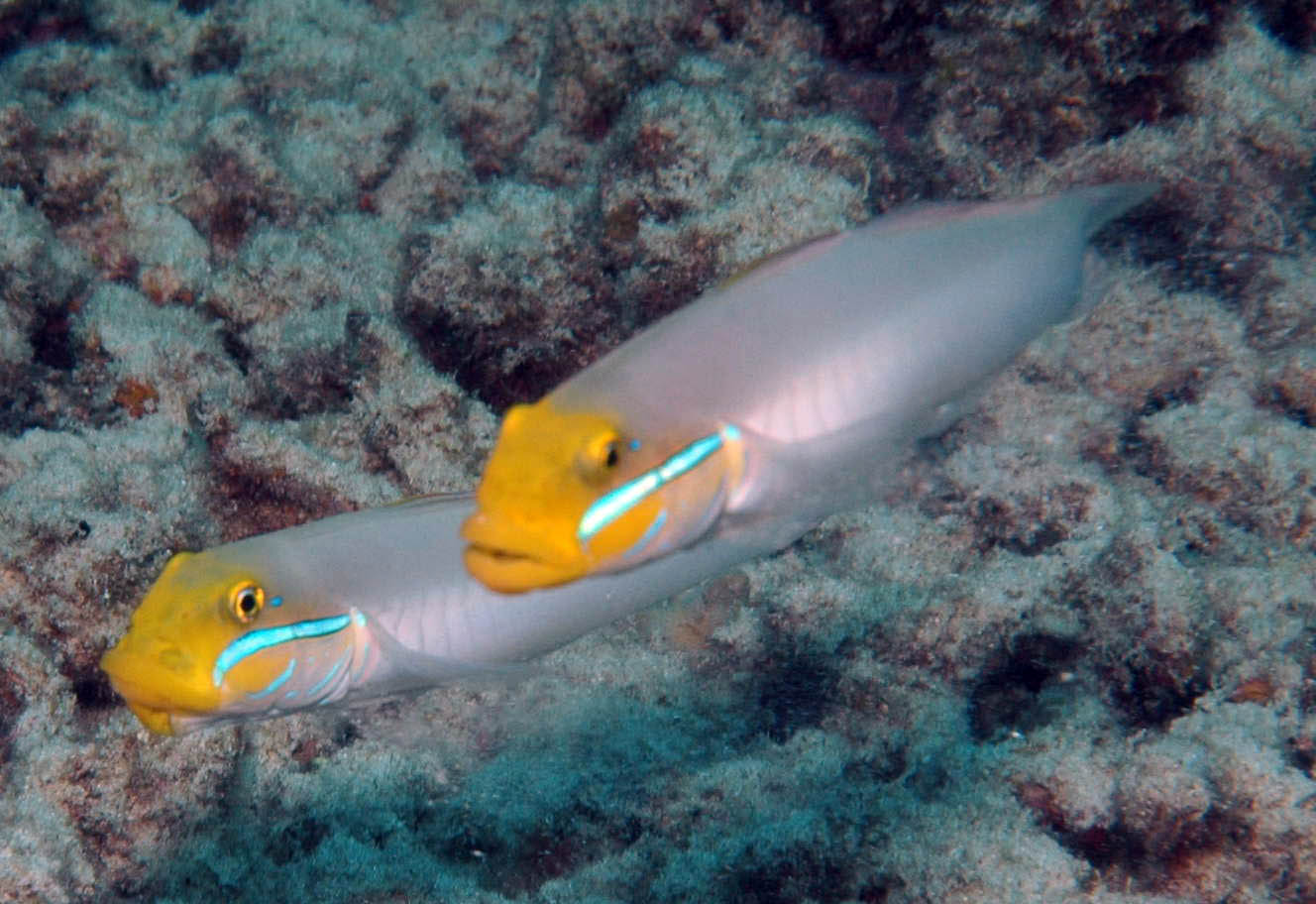
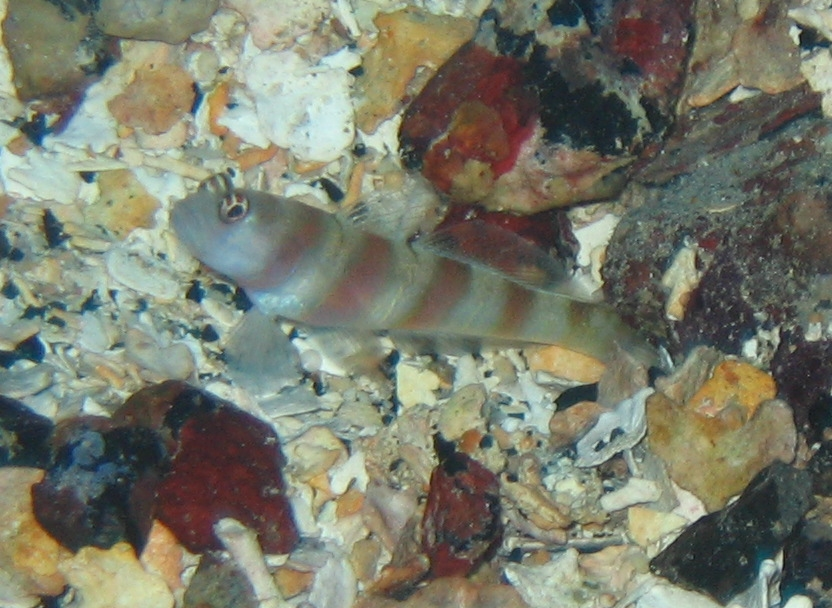
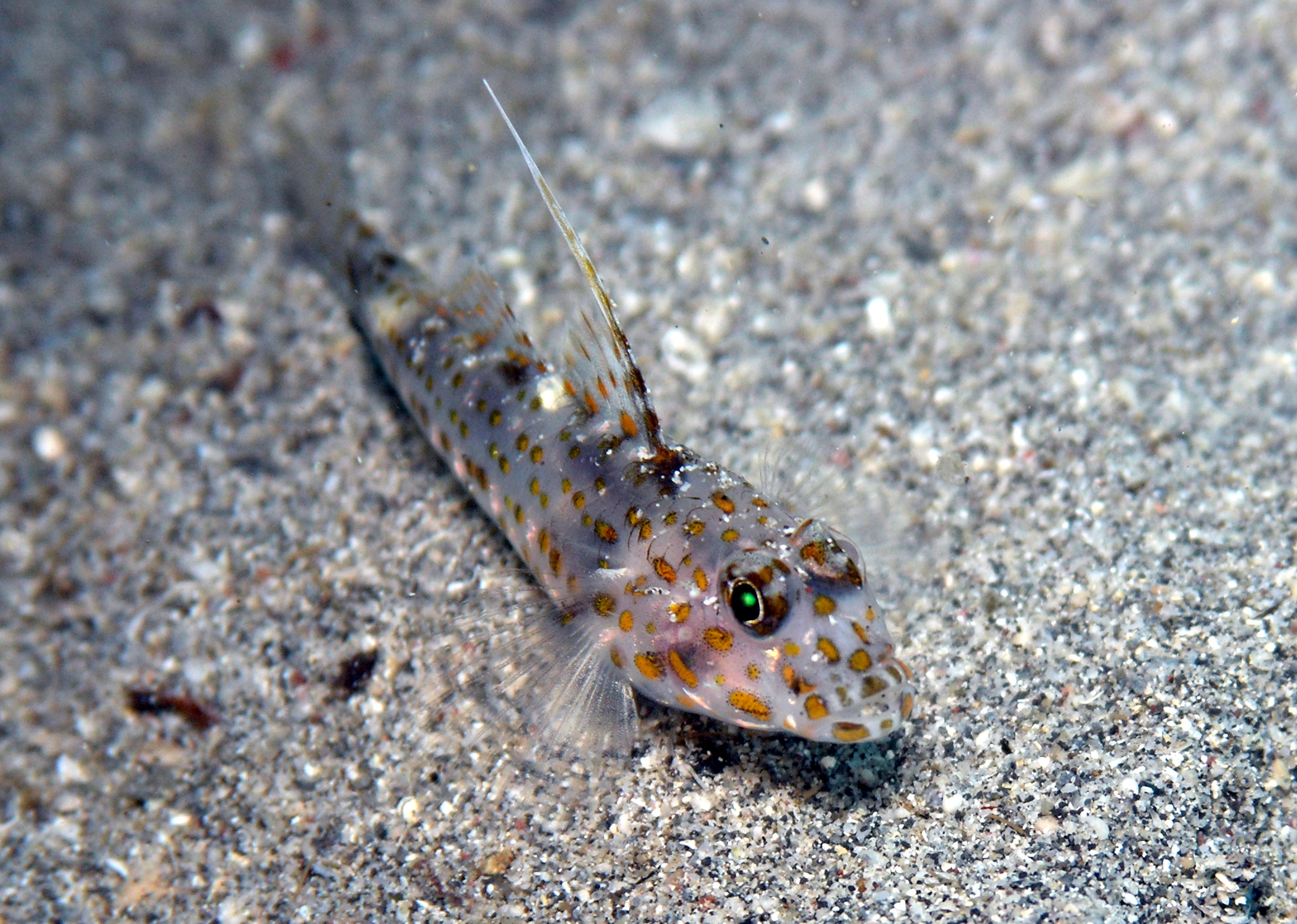
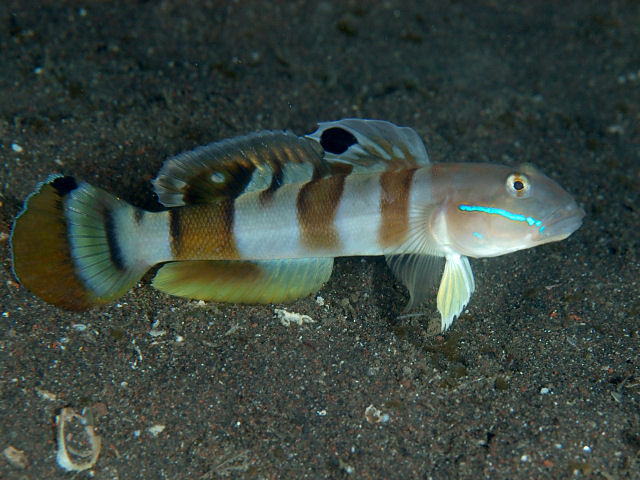
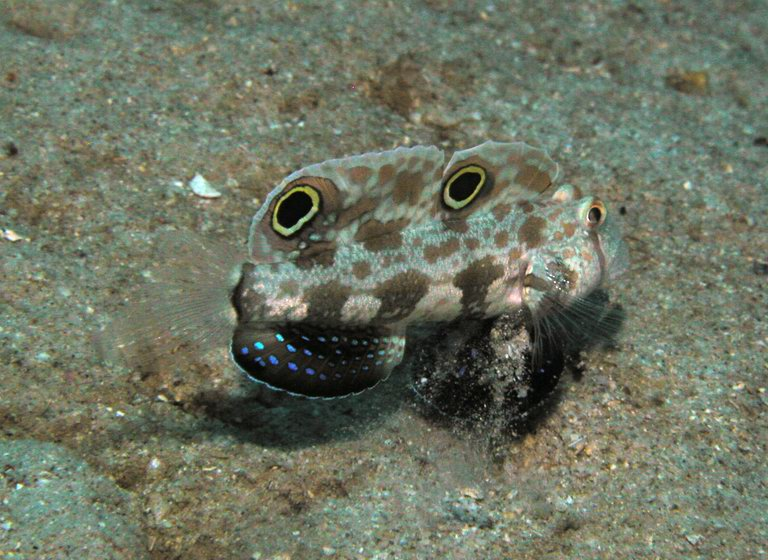
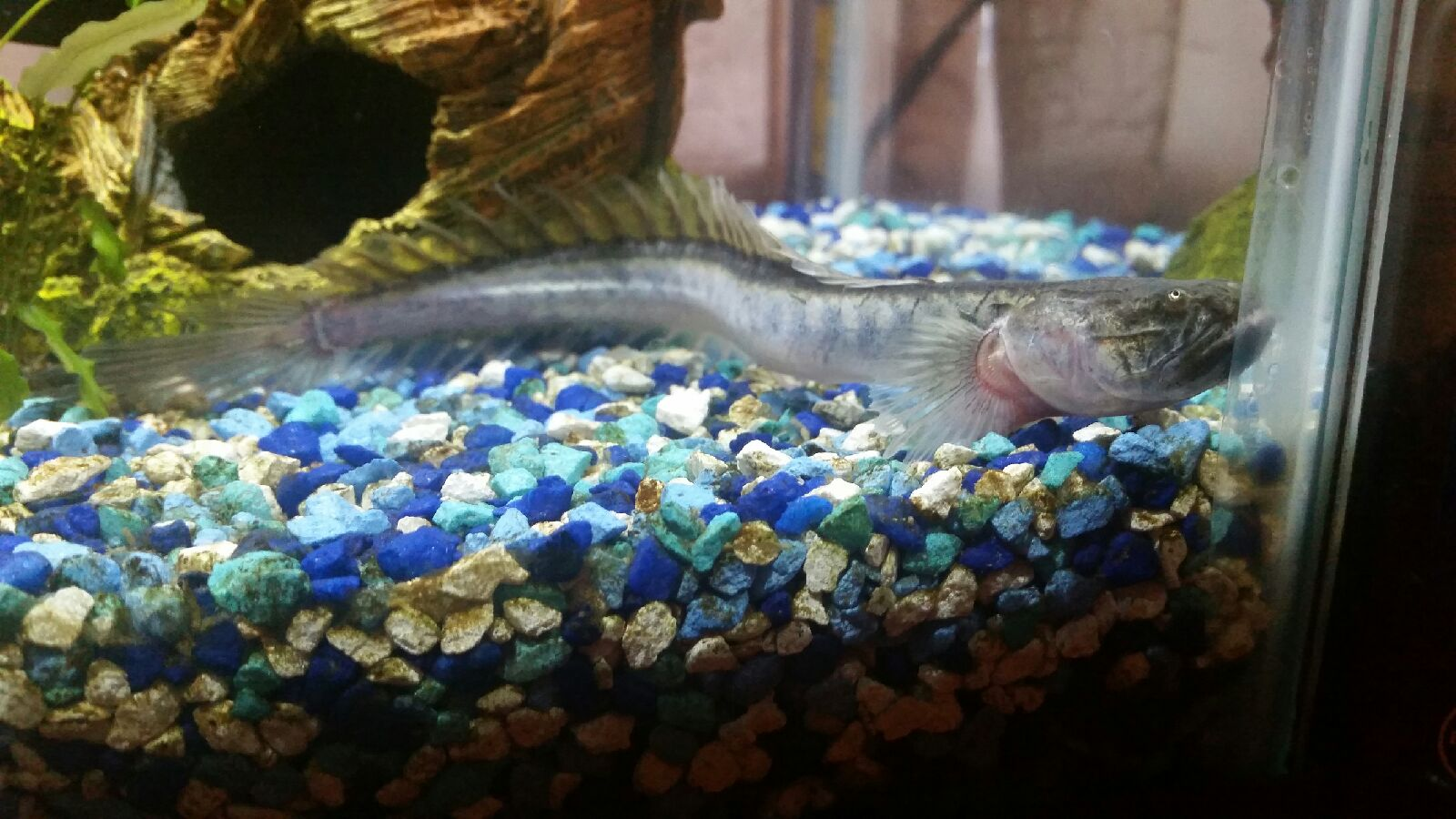
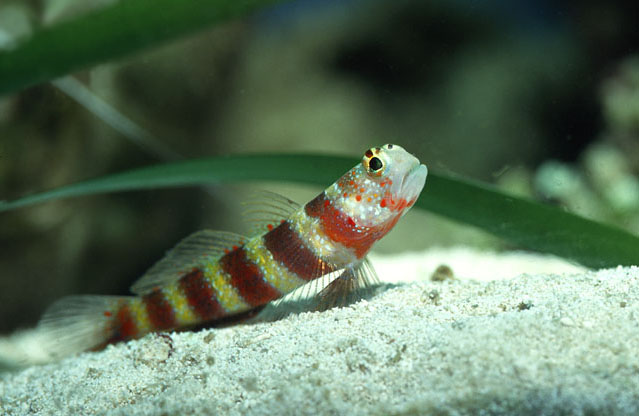
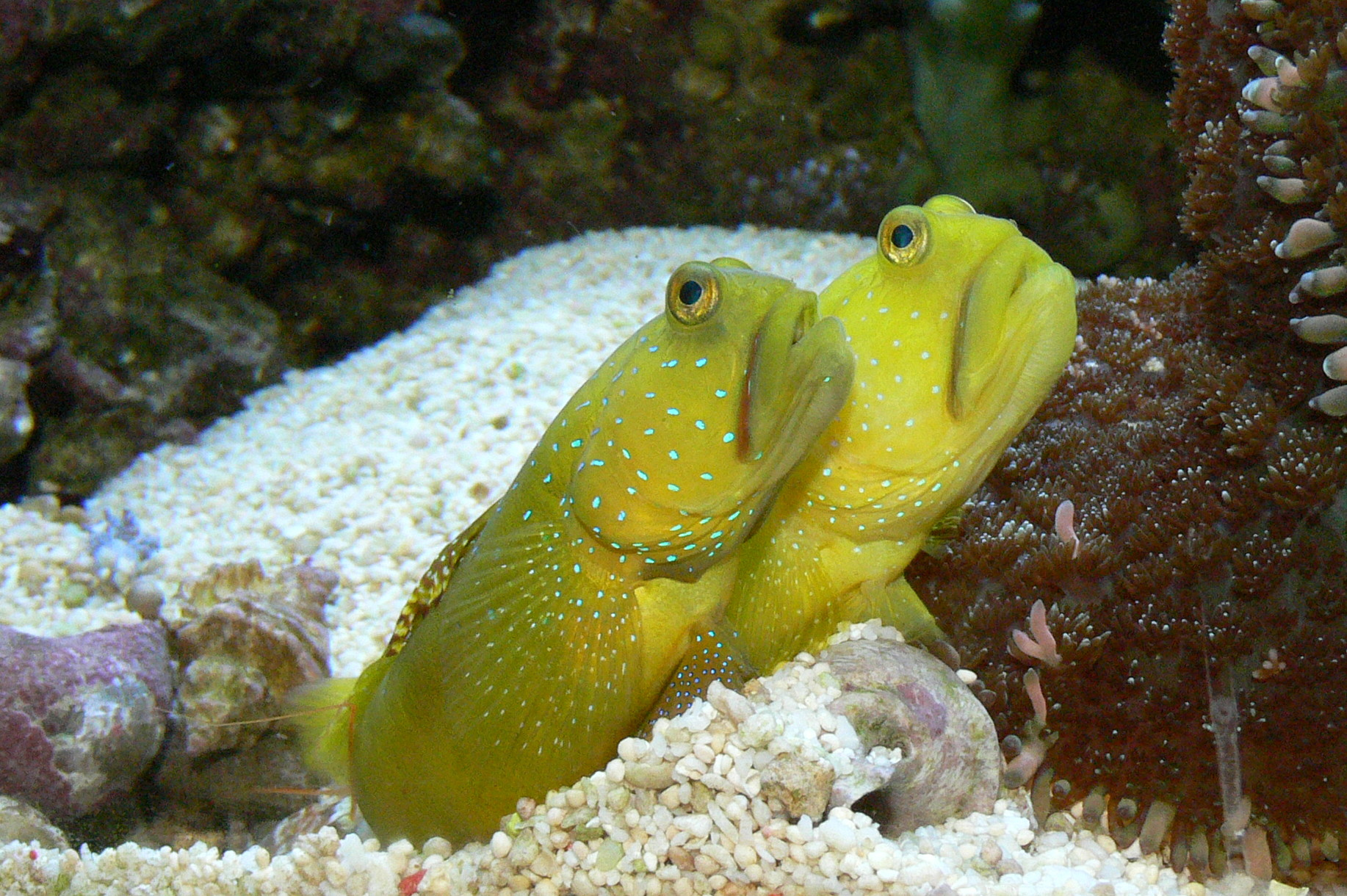
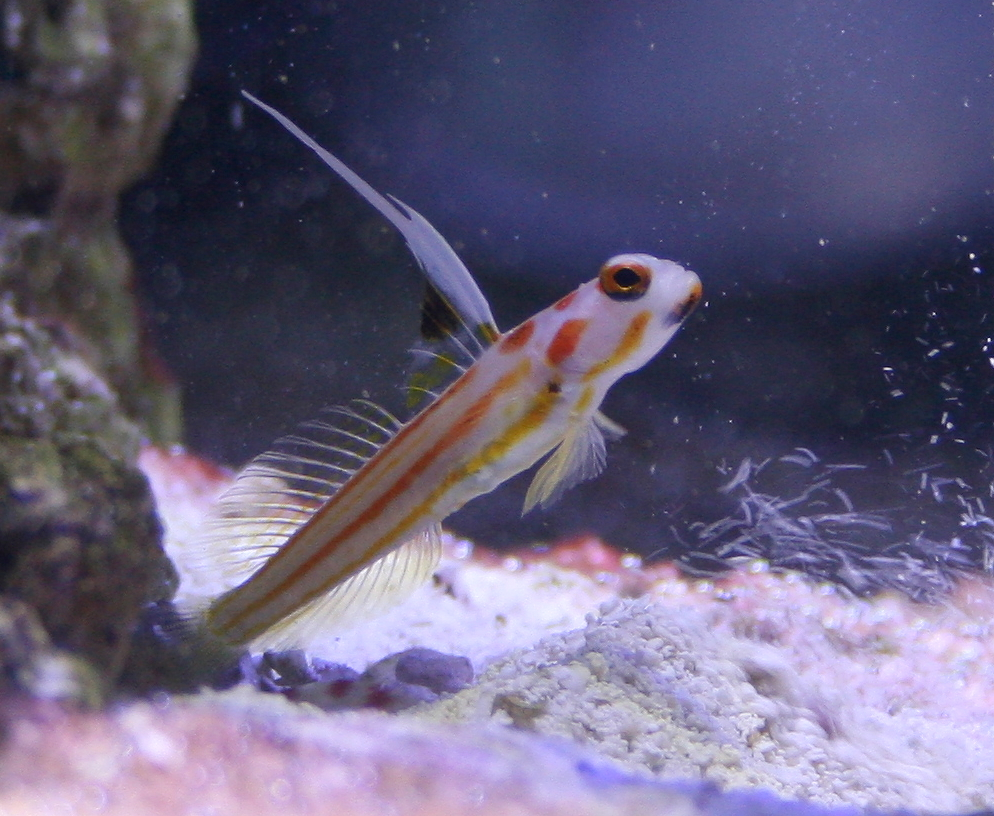
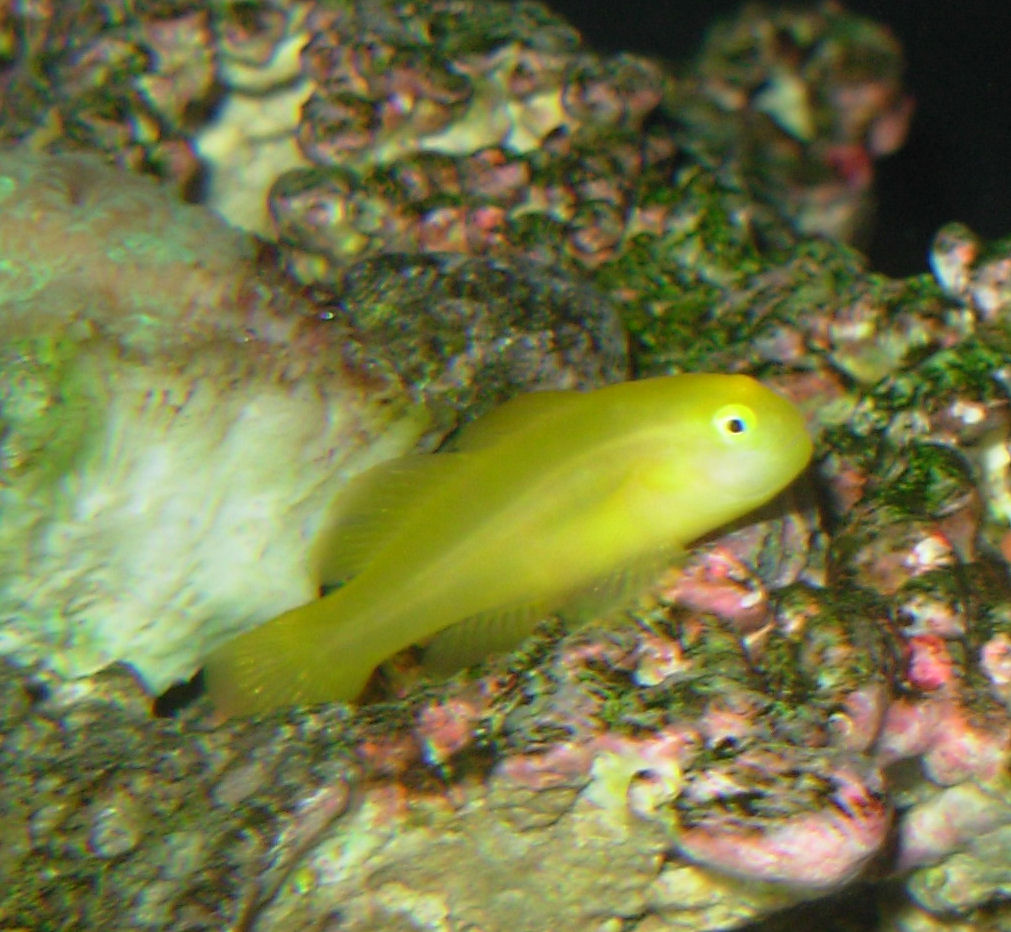
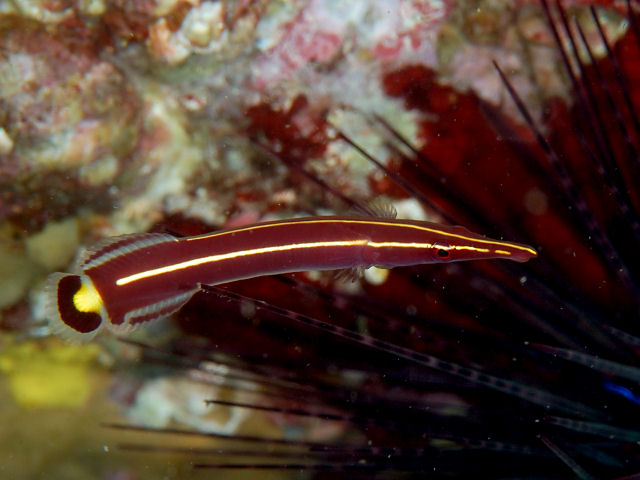
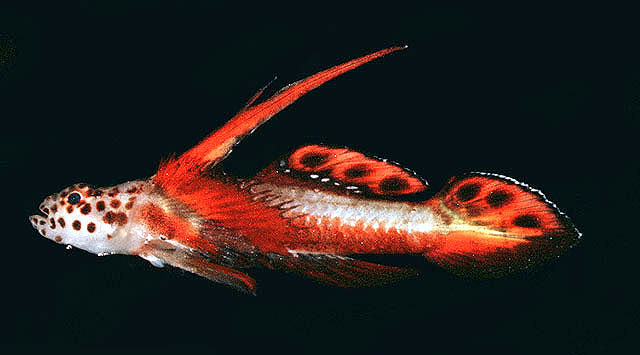
Common name	Image	Taxonomy	Reef safe	Description	Max size
Black barred convict goby		Priolepis nocturna	Yes		4 cm (1.6 in)
Black clown goby		Gobiodon acicularis	Mostly; can destroy unhealthy Acropora by laying its eggs in the coral's tissue	Similar to Yellow clown goby, but black
Bluespotted watchman goby		Cryptocentrus pavoninoides	Yes		12 cm (4.7 in)
Catalina goby		Lythrypnus dalli	Yes	A cold water species that doesn't live long at reef temperatures.	5 cm (2.0 in)
Cave transparent goby		Coryphopterus glaucofraenum	Yes		8 cm (3.1 in)
Citron clown goby		Gobiodon citrinus	Mostly; can destroy unhealthy Acropora by laying its eggs in the coral's tissue		8 cm (3.1 in)
Court jester goby		Amblygobius rainfordi			6 cm (2.4 in)
Diagonal bar prawn goby		Amblyeleotris diagonalis	Yes		8 cm (3.1 in)
Diamond watchman goby		Valenciennea puellaris	Yes	Burrow and sift sand constantly; very good algae eaters	20 cm (7.9 in)
Dracula goby		Stonogobiops dracula	Yes		8 cm (3.1 in)
Gold neon eviota goby		Eviota pellucida	Yes		3 cm (1.2 in)
Green banded goby		Elacatinus multifasciatus	Yes	Small burrowing goby with green vertical stripes	3.5 cm (1.4 in)
Green clown goby		Gobiodon atrangulatus	Yes		4 cm (1.6 in)
Hector's goby		Amblygobius hectori	Yes		8 cm (3.1 in)
Hi fin red banded goby		Stonogobiops nematodes	Yes		5 cm (2.0 in)
Neon goby		Elacatinus oceanops	Yes	A Caribbean cleaner species that sometimes eats larger parasites from other fish.
Orange marked goby		Amblygobius decussatus	Yes		8 cm (3.1 in)
Orange spotted goby		Amblyeleotris guttata	Yes		9 cm (3.5 in)
Orange stripe prawn goby		Amblyeleotris randalli	Yes		9 cm (3.5 in)
Pinkspotted shrimp goby		Gobius melanopus	May eat ornamental shrimp	White fish with pink bands around the body and pink spots on face and fins. One of the most handsome members of the group.	15 cm (5.9 in)
Pinkbar goby		Cryptocentrus aurora	Yes		10 cm (3.9 in)
Red head goby		Elacatinus puncticulatus	Yes	A small goby that can clean like the neon goby but is easily frightened. Often said to 'disappear' in a larger tank, as it never swims out into view.	5 cm (2.0 in)
Red striped goby		Trimma cana	Yes		3 cm (1.2 in)
Sleeper banded goby		Amblygobius phalaena	Yes		15 cm (5.9 in)
Sleeper blue dot goby		Valenciennea sexguttata	Yes		13 cm (5.1 in)
Sleeper gold head goby		Valenciennea strigata	Yes		13 cm (5.1 in)
Sleeper railway glider goby		Valenciennea helsdingenii	Yes		15 cm (5.9 in)
Sleeper striped goby		Valenciennea longipinnis	Yes		15 cm (5.9 in)
Steinitz goby		Amblyeleotris steinitzi	Yes		8 cm (3.1 in)
Tangaroa goby		Ctenogobiops tangaroai	Yes		5 cm (2.0 in)
Tiger watchman goby		Valenciennea wardii	Yes		12 cm (4.7 in)
Two spot goby		Signigobius biocellatus	Yes		8 cm (3.1 in)
Violet goby		Gobioides broussonnetii	No	Also a freshwater and brackish water fish and often sold as Dragon Fish or Dragon Goby	21"
Wheeler's watchman goby		Amblyeleotris wheeleri	Yes		8 cm (3.1 in)
Yellow watchman goby		Cryptocentrus cinctus	Yes	A species of "watchman" or "shrimp" goby that can form a symbiotic relationship with pistol shrimp	7 cm (2.8 in)
Yasha goby		Stonogobiops yasha	Yes	A species of "watchman" or "shrimp" goby that will form a symbiotic relationship with the red and white banded pistol shrimp, Alpheus randalli.	6 cm (2.4 in)
Yellow clown goby		Gobiodon okinawae	Yes	Small yellow fish that likes branching corals	3.5 cm (1.4 in)
Yellow priolepis goby		Priolepis aureoviridis	Yes		6 cm (2.4 in)
Yellow stripe clingfish		Diademichthys lineatus	Yes		5 cm (2.0 in)
Flaming Prawn Goby		Discordipinna griessingeri	Yes	A very small goby species with bright colors and a large dorsal fin. Hides in crevices and holes during the day and is nocturnal.	1.8 cm (0.7in)

== Grunts ==
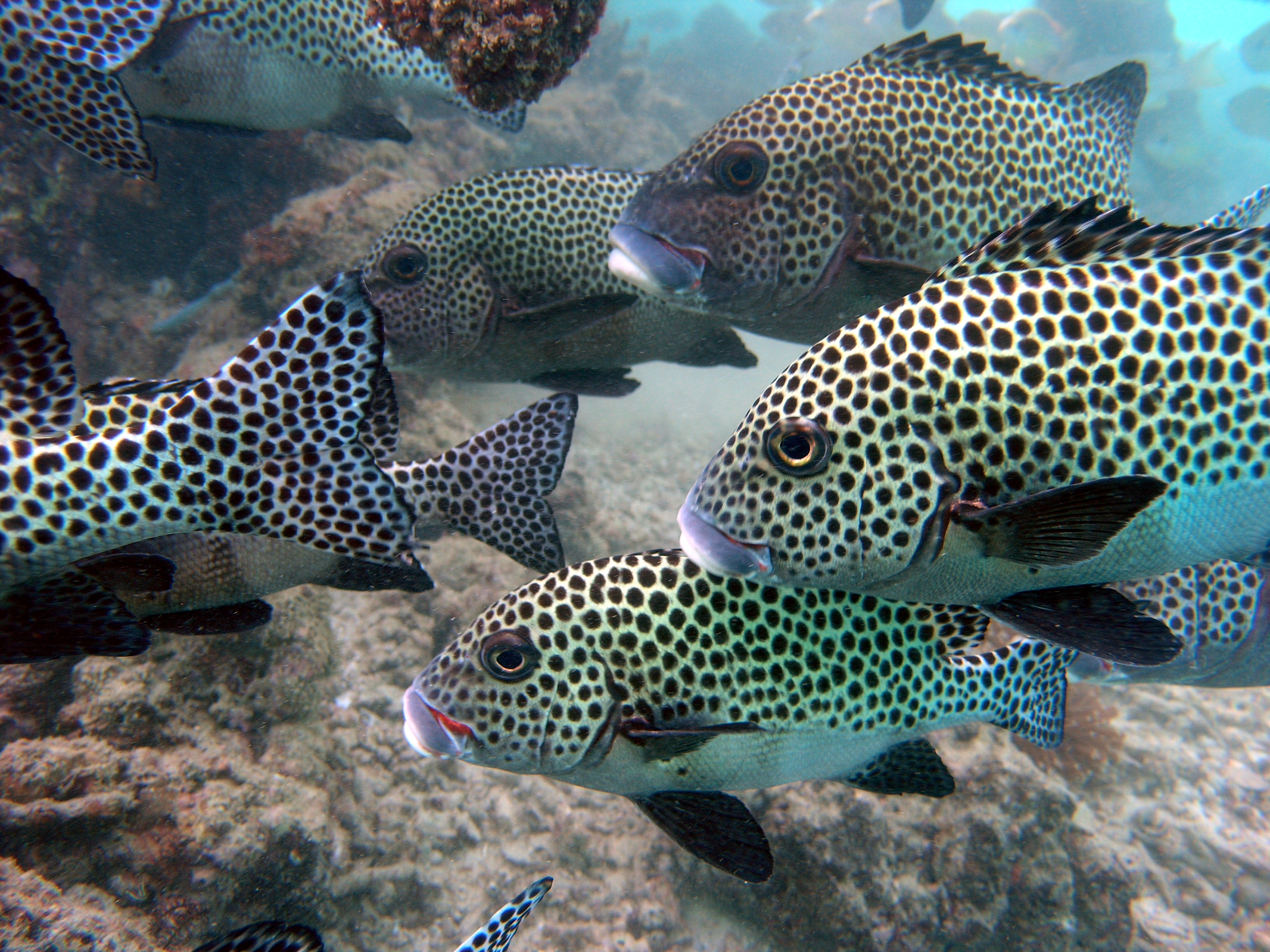
Harlequin sweetlips

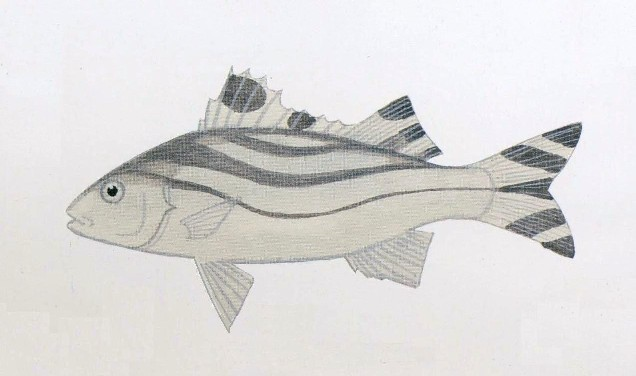
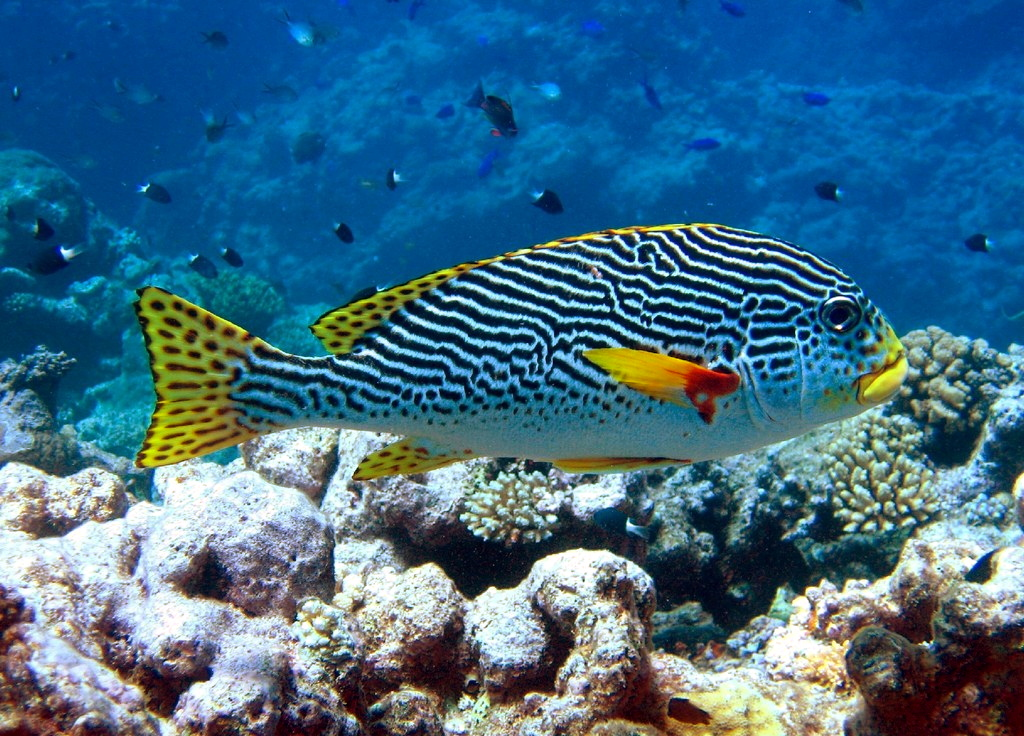
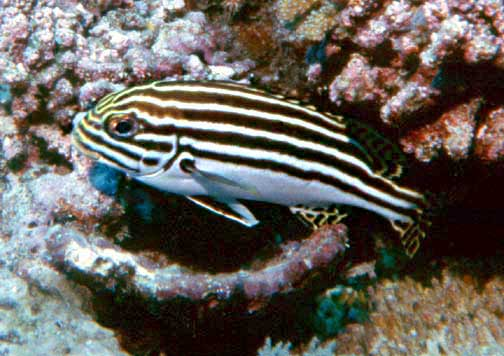
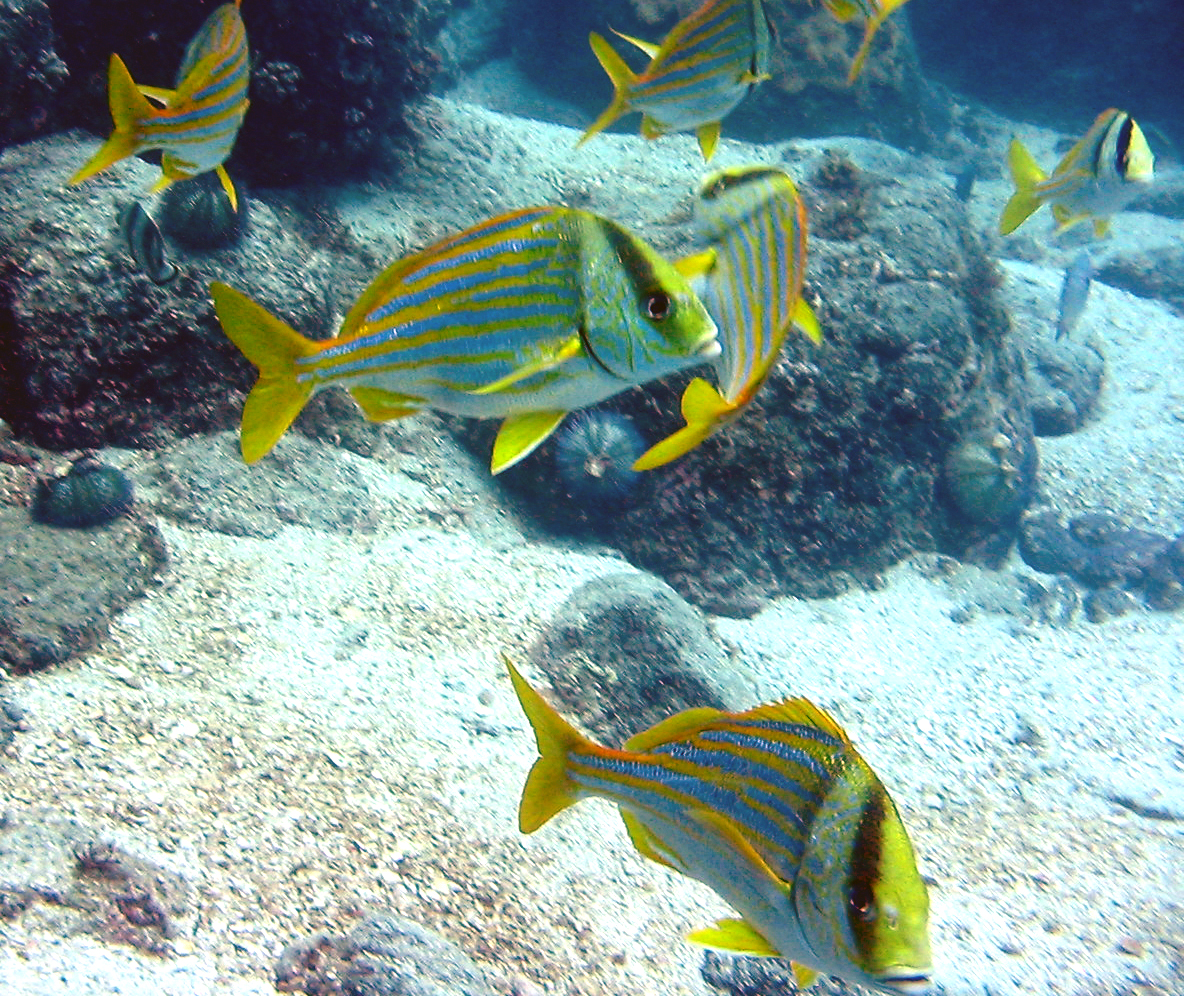
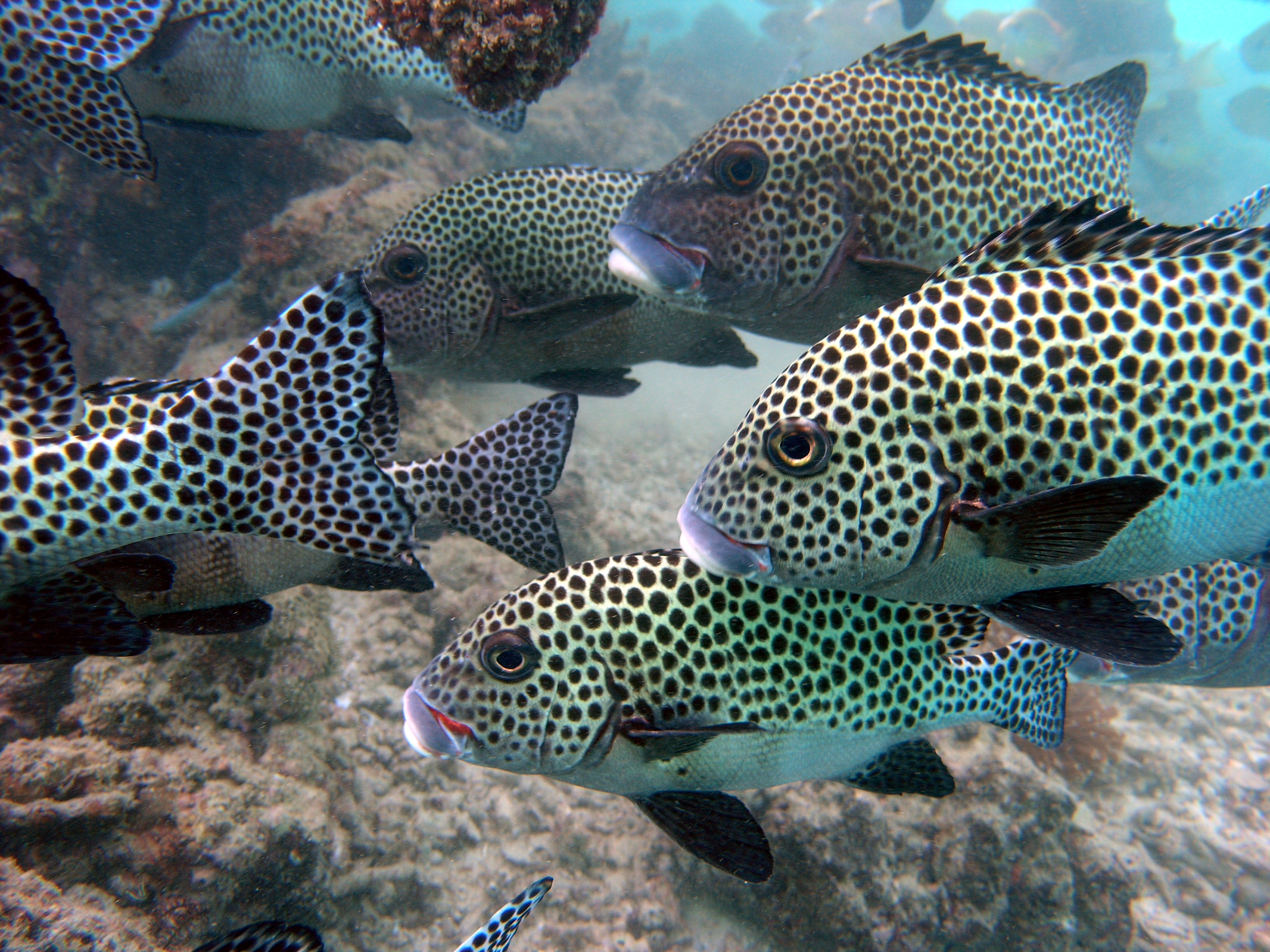
Common name	Image	Taxonomy	Reef safe	Description	Max size
Crescent banded grunt		Terapon jarbua	No
Dogfish prientalis		Plectorhinchus lineatus	No		86 cm (33.9 in)
Oriental sweetlips		Plectorhinchus orientalis	No		84 cm (33.1 in)
Painted sweetlips		Plectorhinchus picus	No		84 cm (33.1 in)
Porkfish		Anisotremus virginicus	No		41 cm (16.1 in)
Spotted sweetlips		Plectorhinchus chaetodonoides	No		74 cm (29.1 in)
Striped sweetlips		Plectorhinchus diagrammus	No		51 cm (20.1 in)
Twostriped sweetlips		Plectorhinchus albovittatus	No		99 cm (39.0 in)

== Hamlet ==
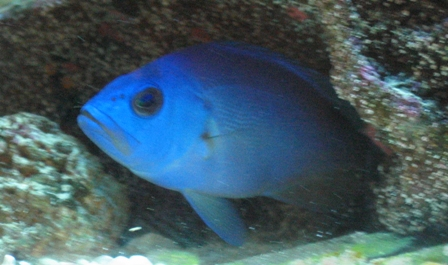
Blue hamlet

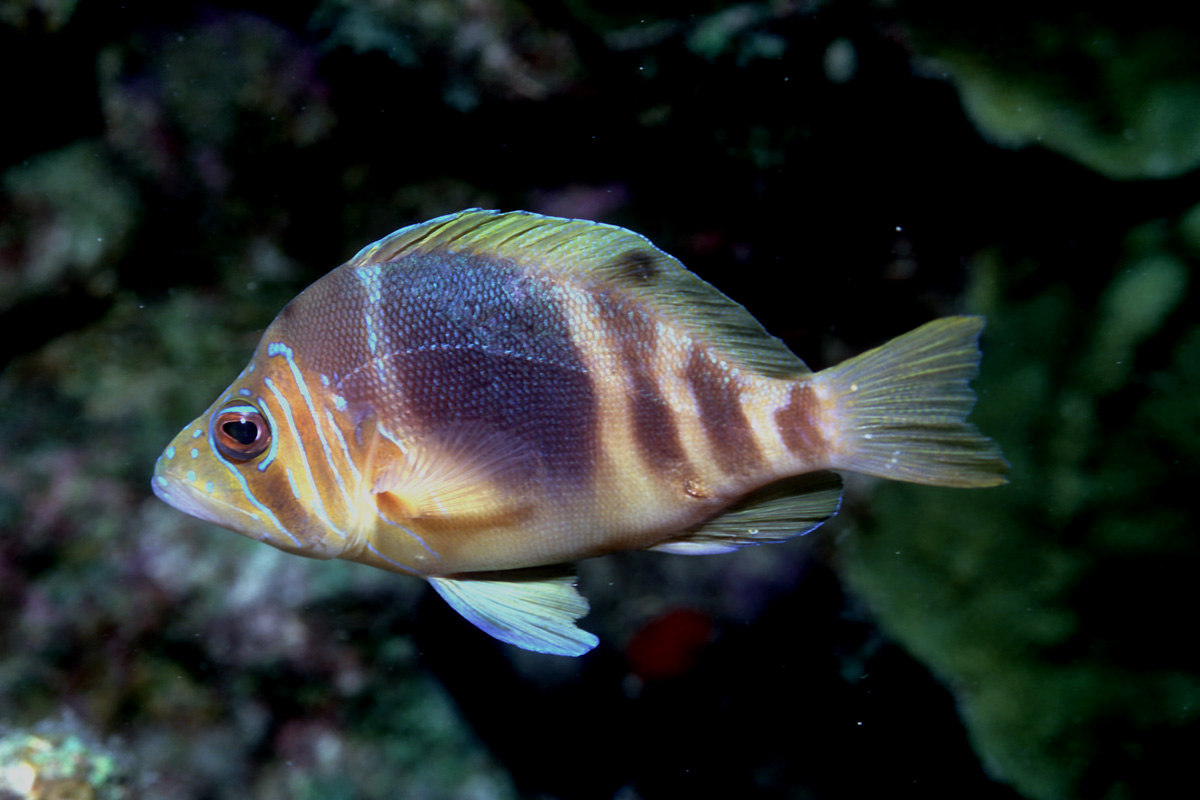
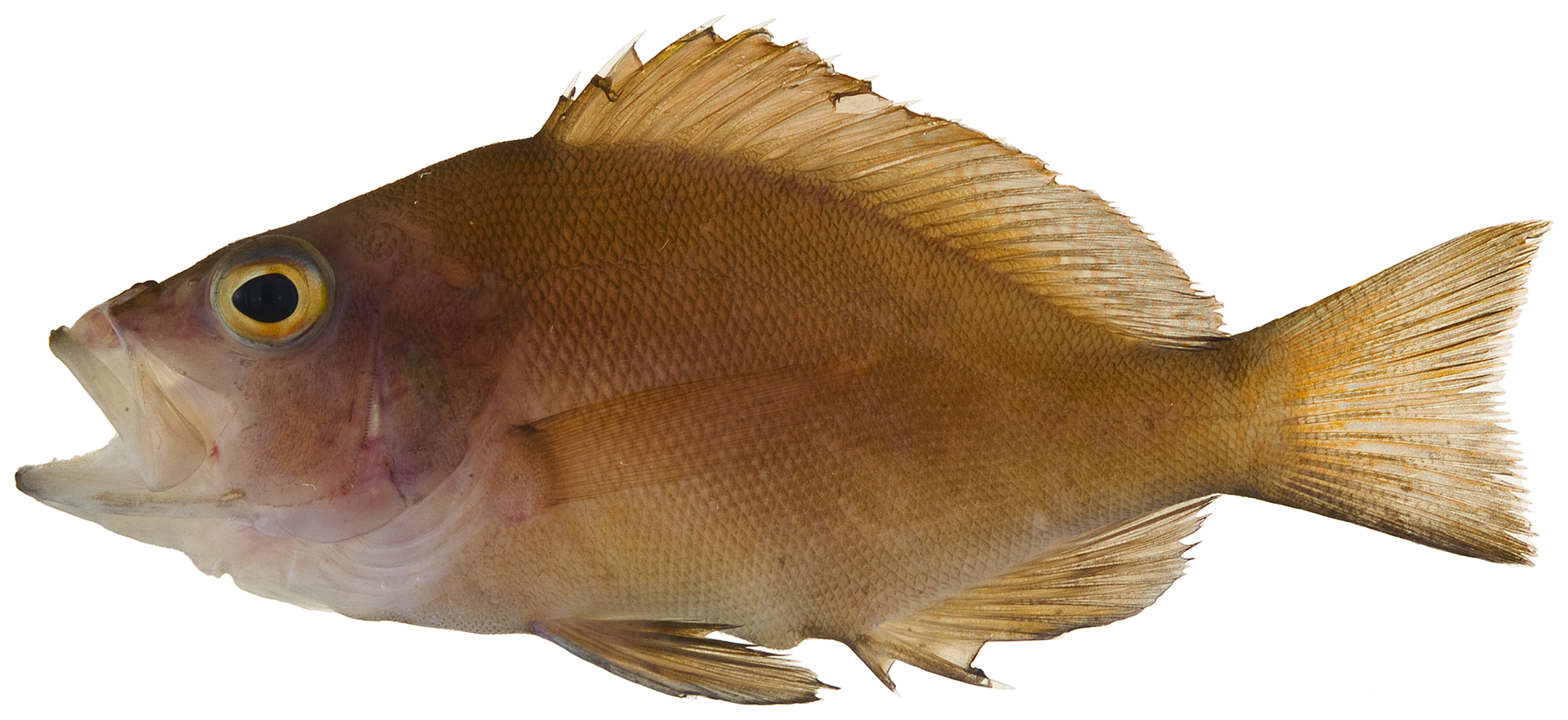
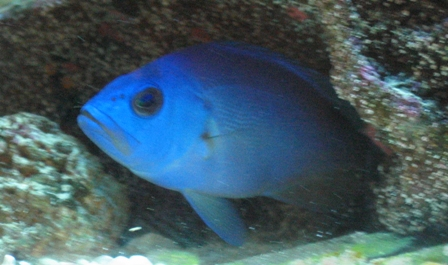
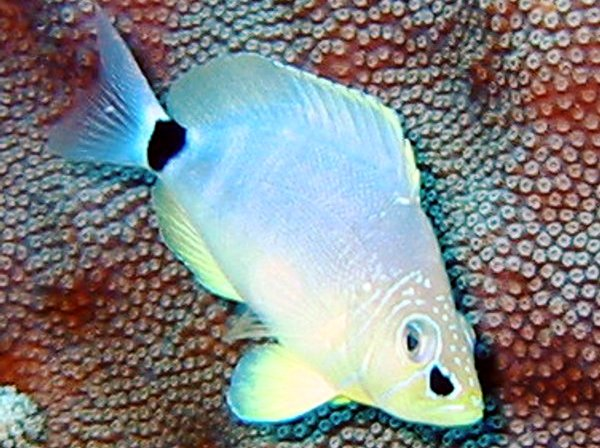
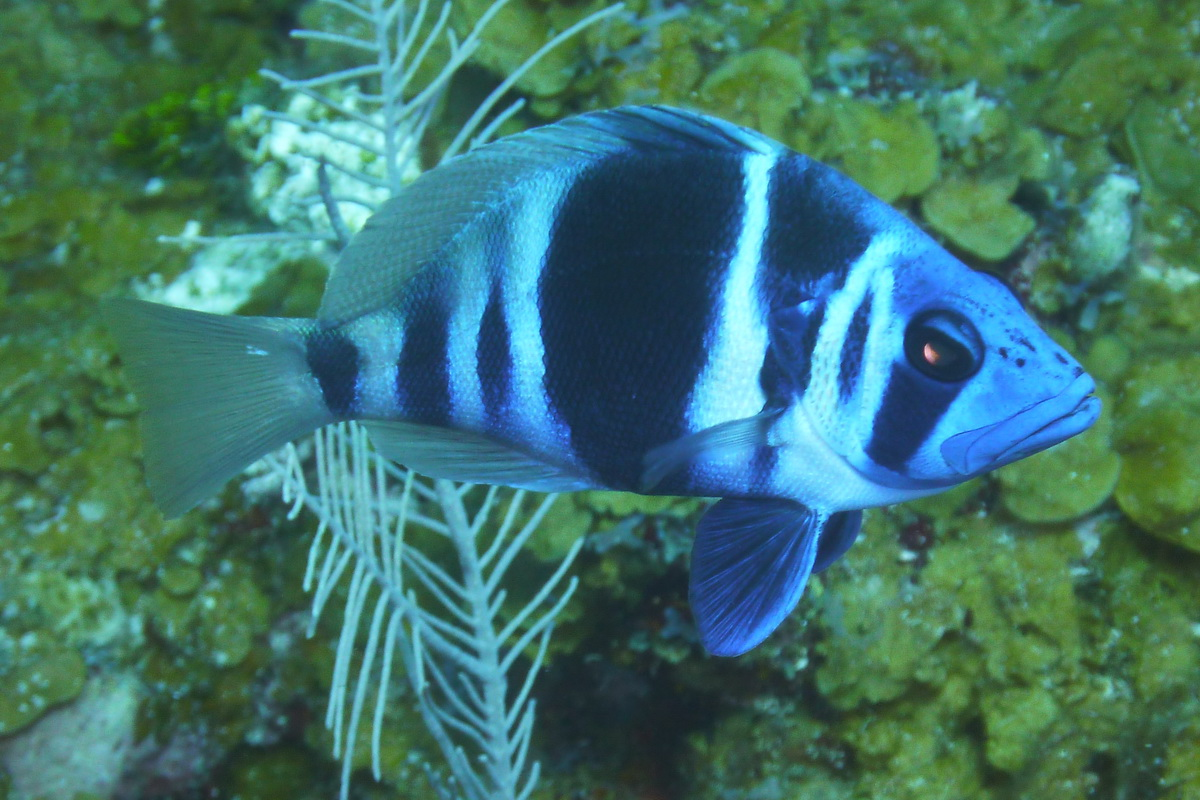
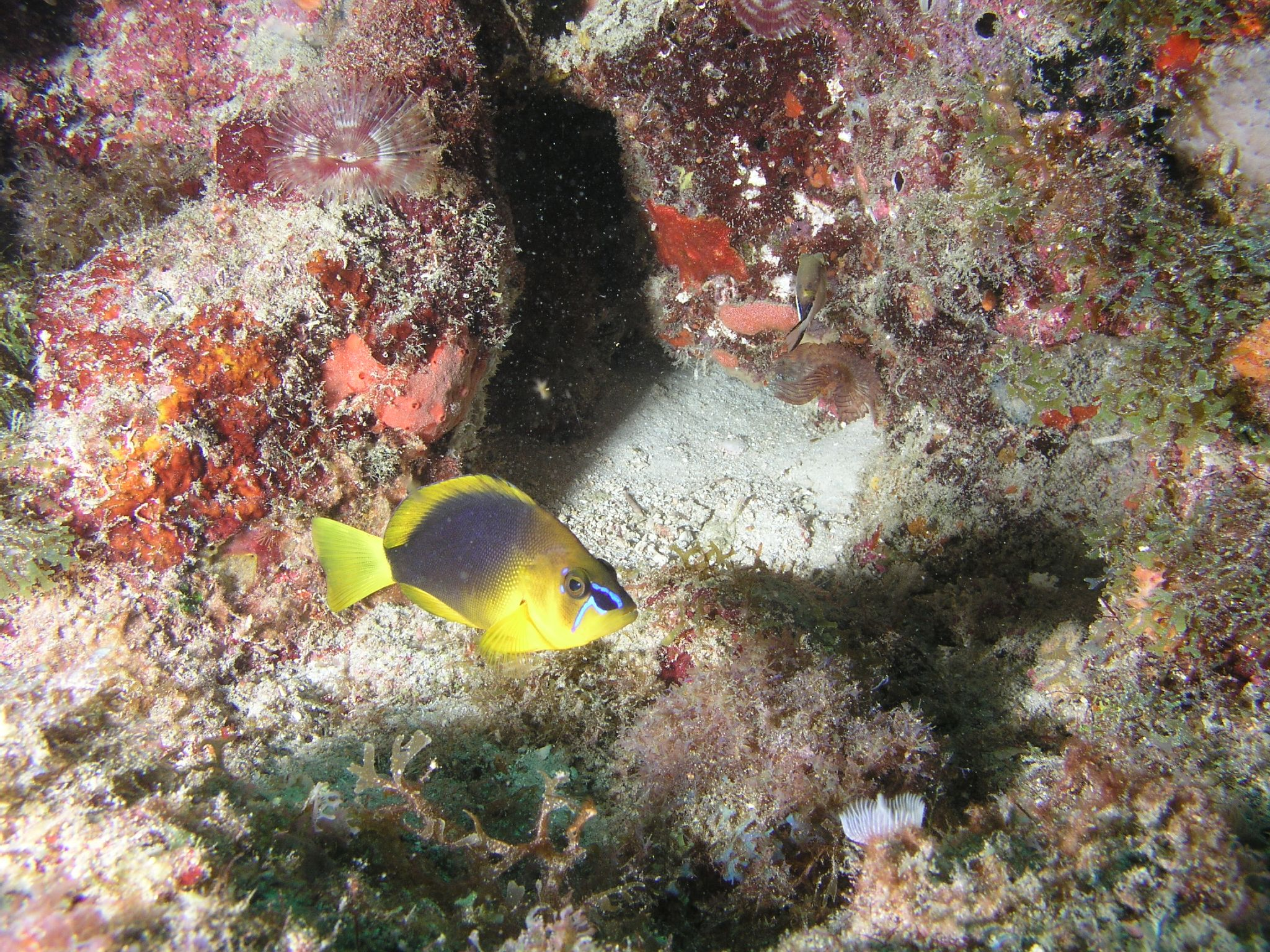
Common name	Image	Taxonomy	Reef safe	Description	Max size
Barred hamlet		Hypoplectrus puella	No		15 cm (5.9 in)
Black hamlet		Hypoplectrus nigricans	No		15 cm (5.9 in)
Blue hamlet		Hypoplectrus gemma	Not with shrimp		13 cm (5.1 in)
Butter hamlet		Hypoplectrus unicolor	Not with shrimp		13 cm (5.1 in)
Golden hamlet		Hypoplectrus gummigutta	Not with shrimp
Indigo hamlet		Hypoplectrus indigo			14 cm (5.5 in)
Shy hamlet		Hypoplectrus guttavarius	Not with shrimp		13 cm (5.1 in)

== Hawkfish ==
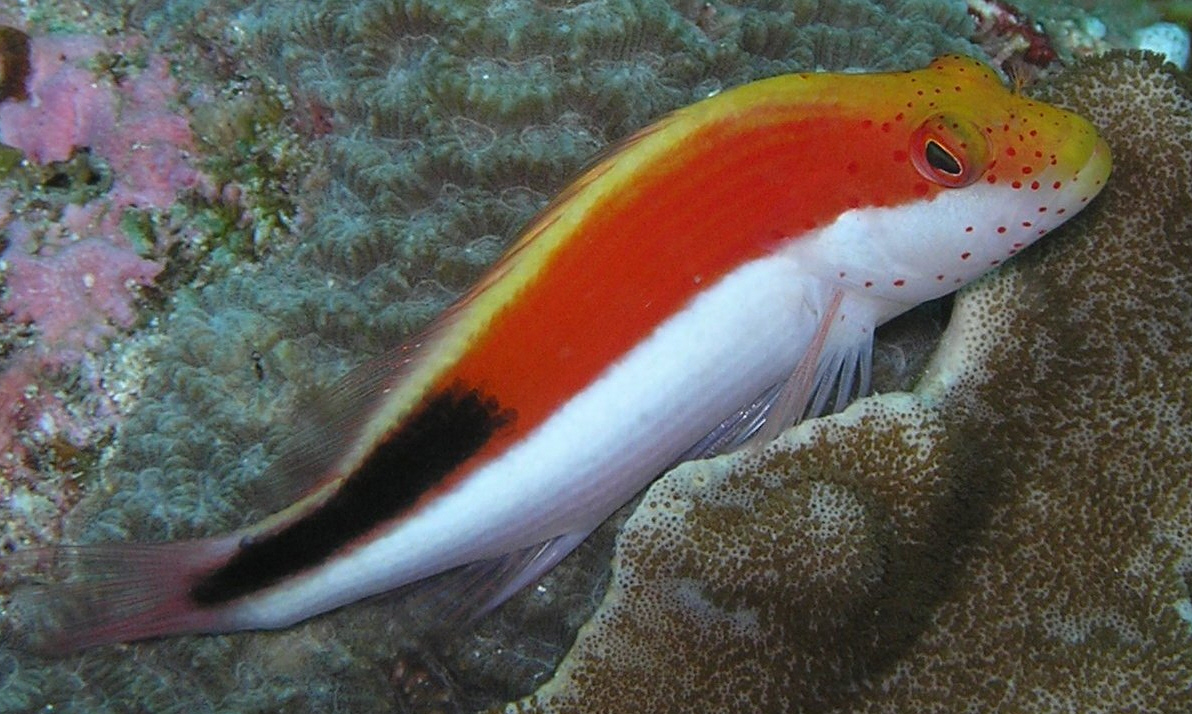
Spotted hawkfish

Attractive and relatively small, Hawkfish make excellent additions to fish only or FOWLR aquariums. With extreme caution taken, they could be kept in reef aquariums, but because of their propensity to eat small ornamental shrimps and other mobile invertebrates (usually leaving sessile invertebrates alone) they are not considered reef safe. Lacking a swim bladder, Hawkfish can often be found resting in crevices of rocks or among the branches of corals or gorgonians. Hawkfish are easy to care for and not picky at all about water quality. A varied diet, including spirulina and small meaty foods like Mysis is recommended.

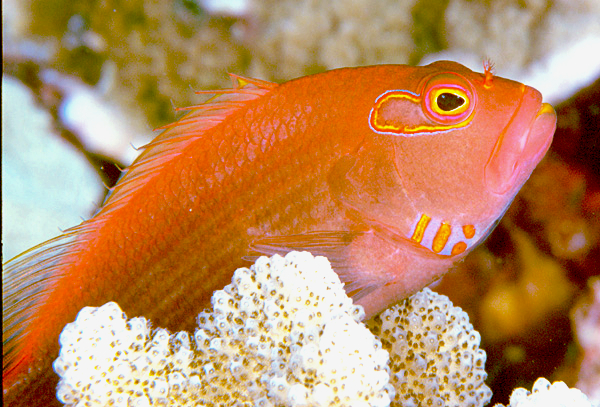
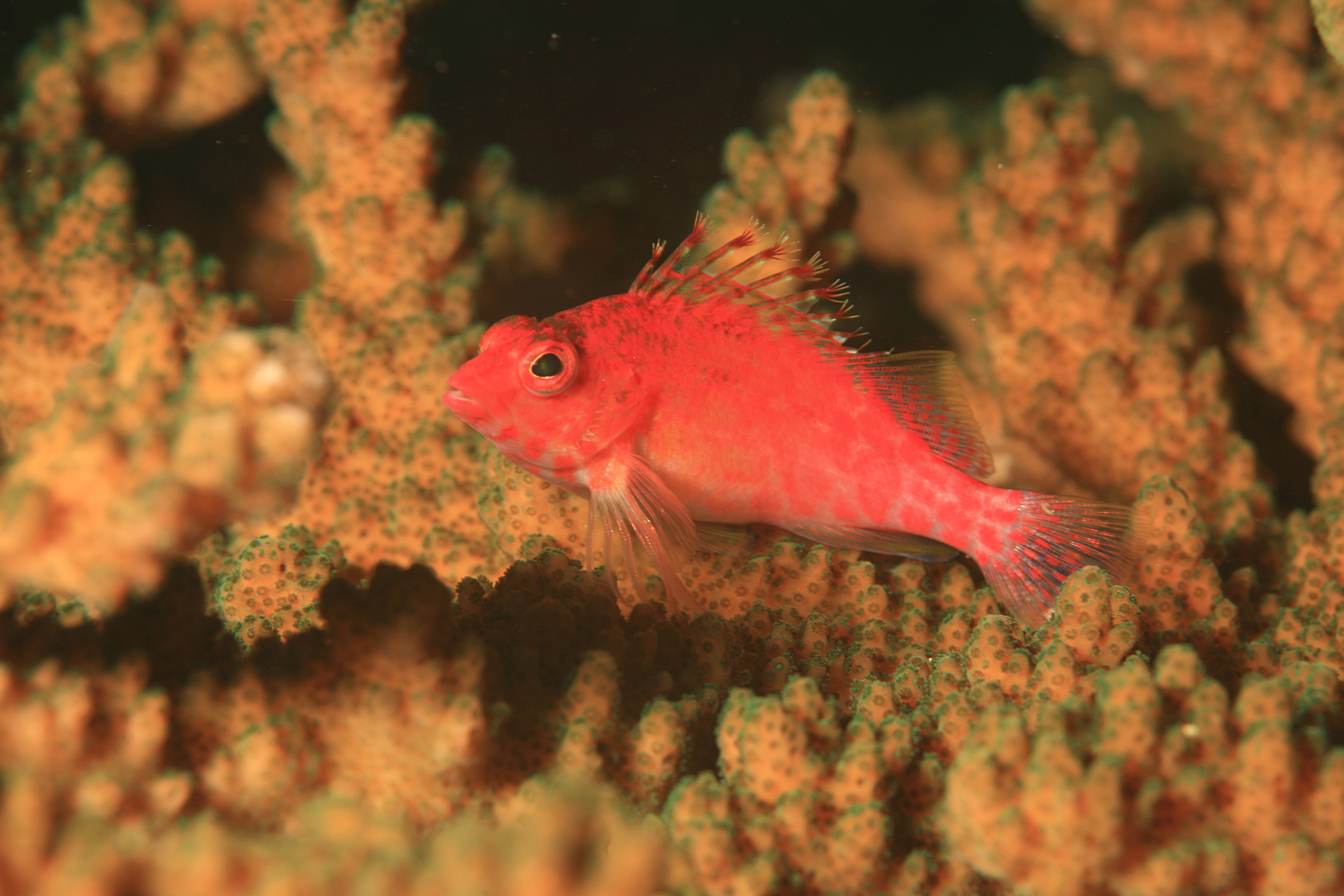
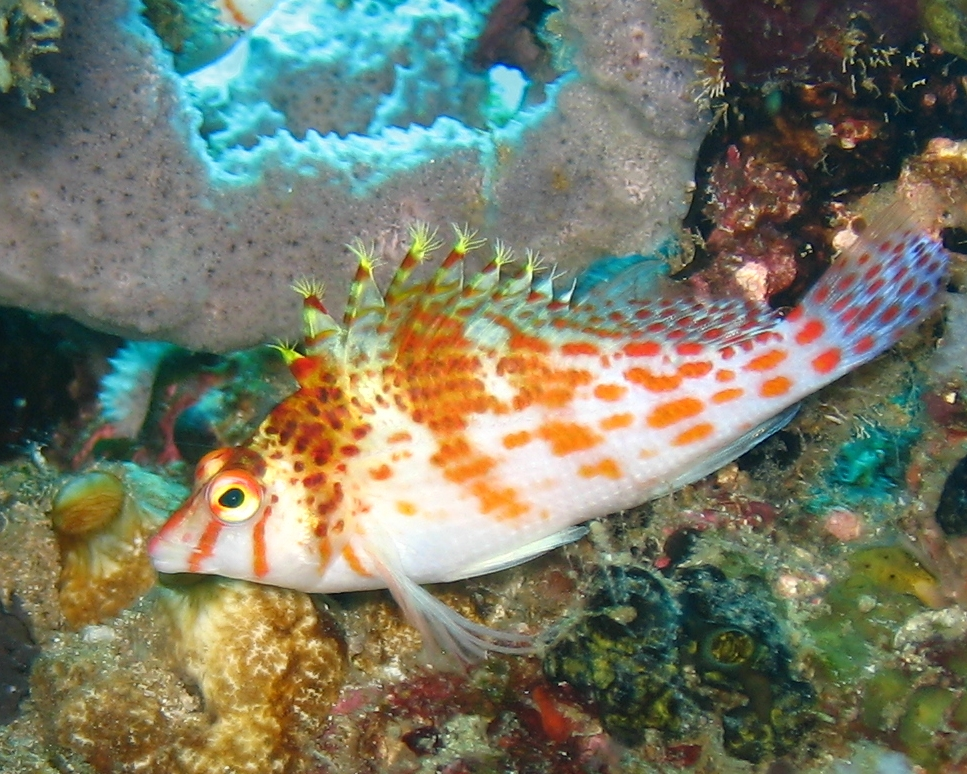
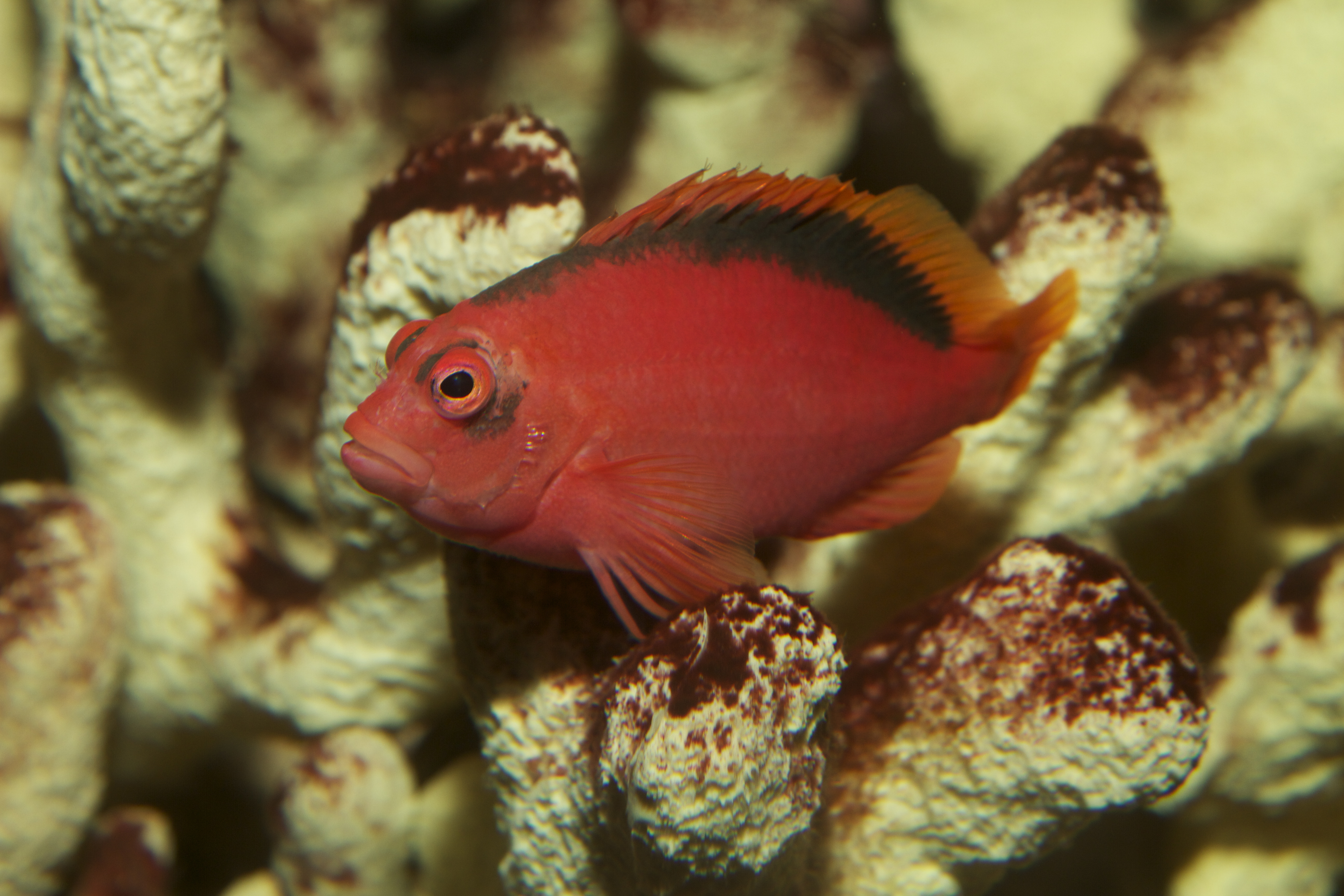
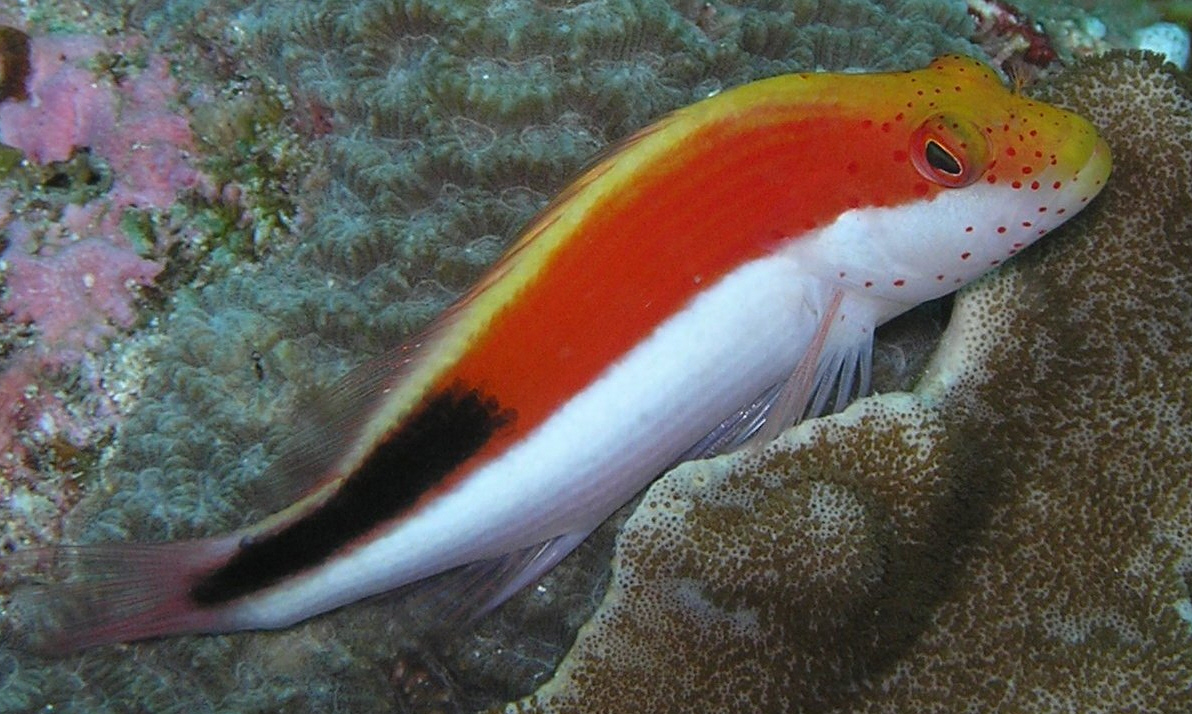
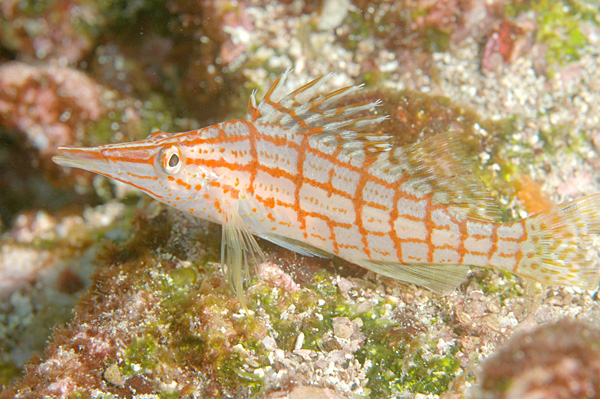
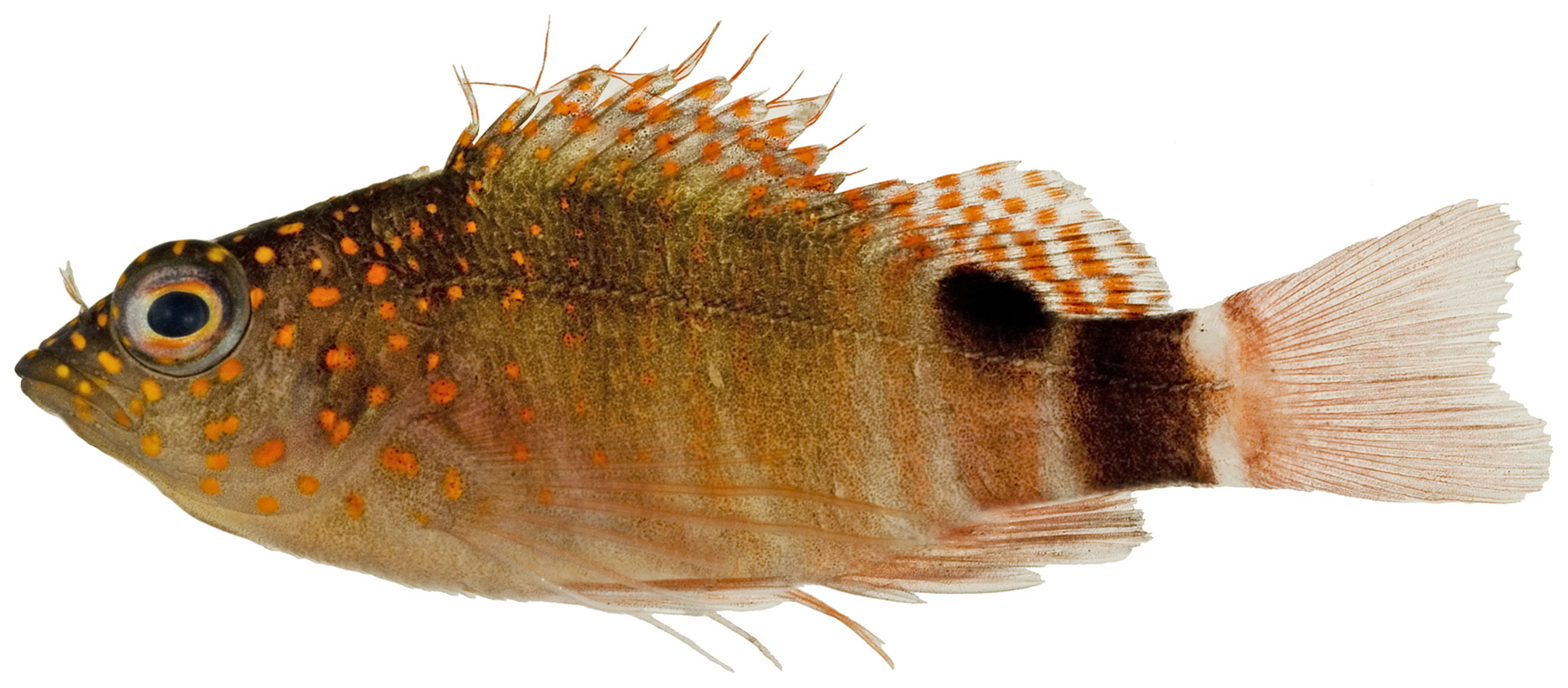
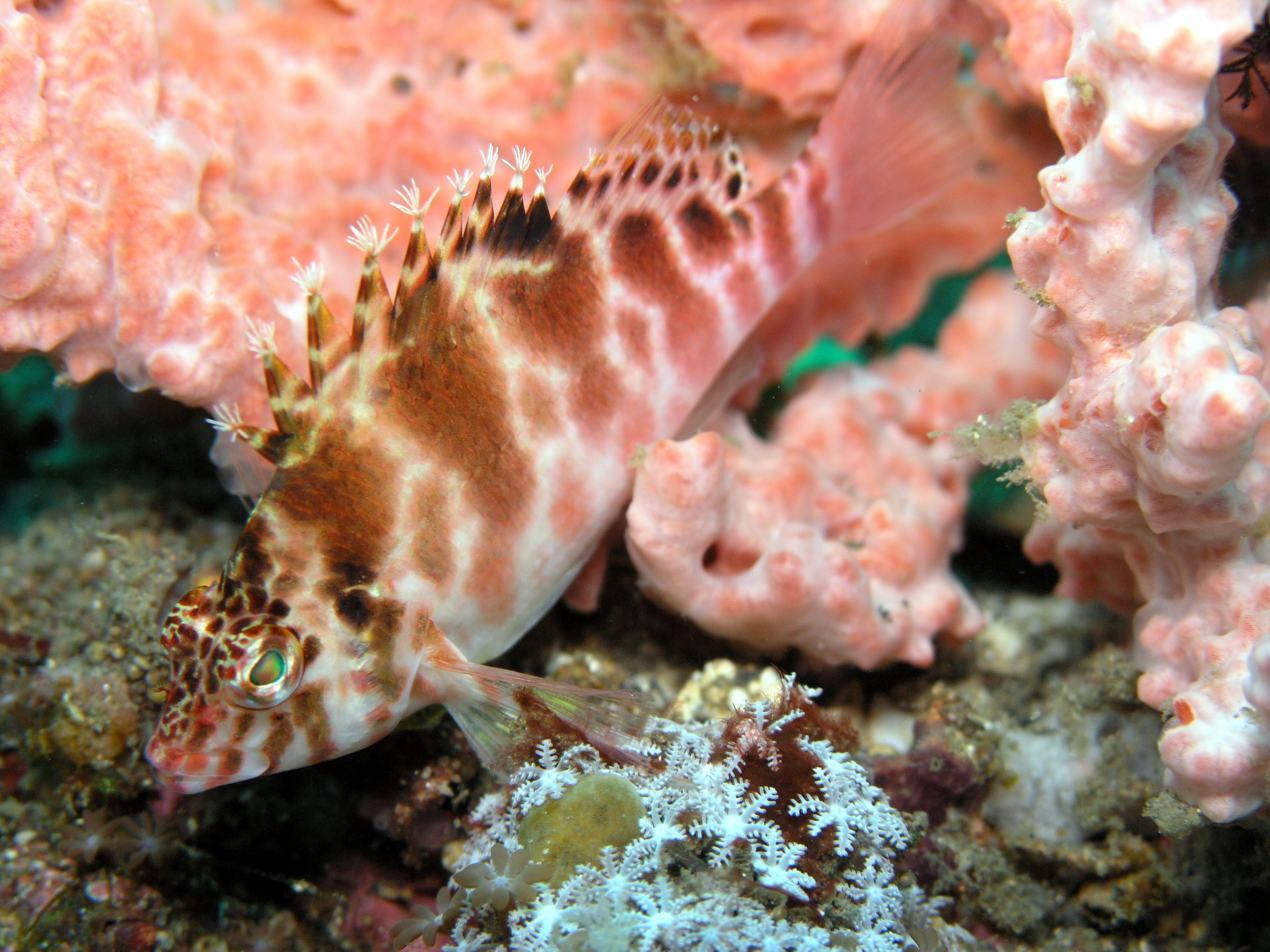
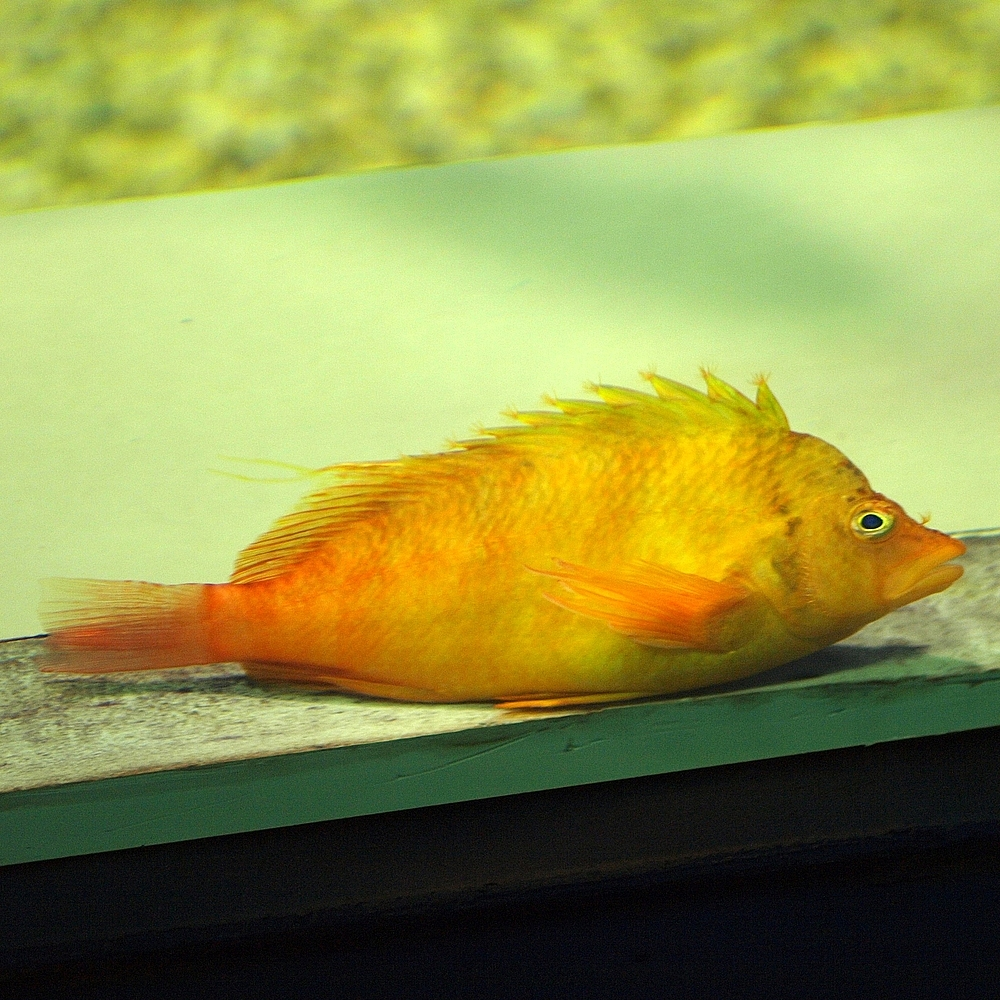
Common name	Image	Taxonomy	Reef safe	Description	Max size
Arc eye hawkfish		Paracirrhites arcatus	Caution; will eat shrimp	Brown to yellow body with reddish dorsal fin, distinctive white caudal fin, and small semicircular marking behind eye.	20 cm (7.9 in)
Blood red hawkfish		Cirrhitichthys fasciatus	Caution; will eat shrimp		12.7 cm (5.0 in)
Coral hawkfish		Cirrhitichthys oxycephalus	Caution; may eat small shrimp		8.5 cm (3.3 in)
Falco's hawkfish		Cirrhitichthys falco	Caution; may eat small shrimp		7 cm (2.8 in)
Flame hawkfish		Neocirrhitus armatus	Caution; may eat small shrimp	Striking red body with black on fin tips and yellow lips.	9 cm (3.5 in)
Freckled hawkfish		Paracirrhites forsteri	Caution; will eat shrimp		22.5 cm (8.9 in)
Golden hawkfish		Paracirrhites xanthus	Caution; will eat shrimp		12 cm (4.7 in)
Longnose hawkfish		Oxycirrhites typus	Caution; may eat small shrimp	White with red lattice-like markings resembling a grid. Nose is elongated and tissue between the spines of the dorsal fin is missing.	13 cm (5.1 in)
Lyretail hawkfish		Cirrhitichthys polyactis	Caution; may eat small shrimp		14 cm (5.5 in)
Redspotted hawkfish		Amblycirrhitus pinos	Caution; may eat small shrimp		9.5 cm (3.7 in)
Spotted hawkfish		Cirrhitichthys aprinus	Caution; may eat small shrimp	Bright red with distinctive diamond shaped markings down back, becoming darker towards the topside of body.	12.5 cm (4.9 in)
Whitespot hawkfish		Paracirrhites hemistictus	Caution; will eat shrimp		29 cm (11.4 in)
Yellow hawkfish		Cirrhitichthys aureus	Caution; may eat small shrimp		7 cm (2.8 in)

== Hogfish ==
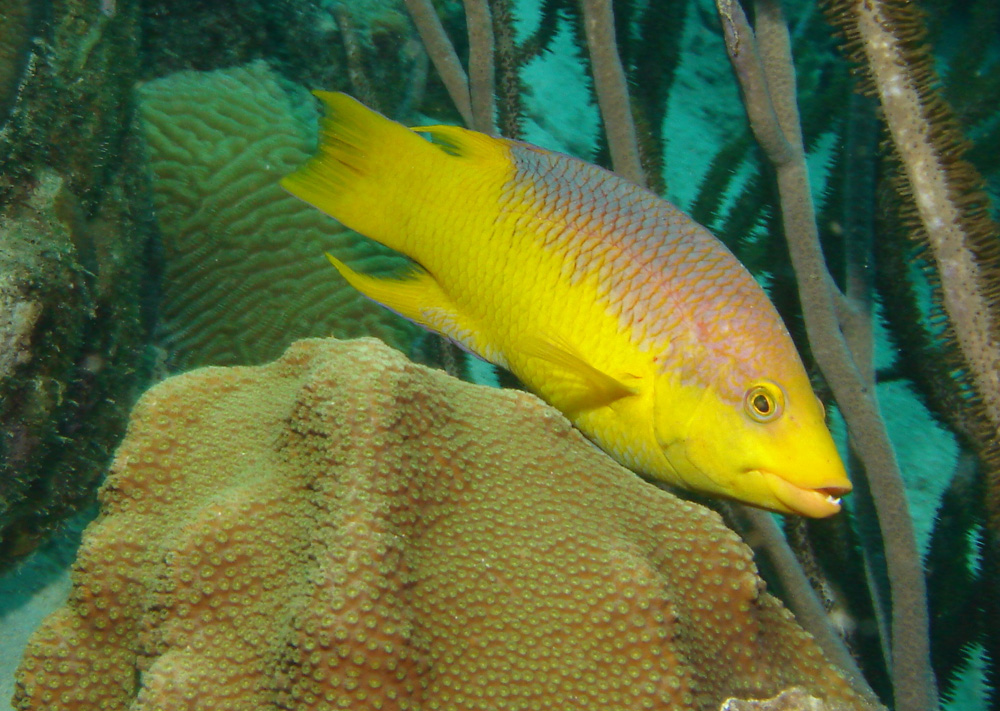
Spanish hogfish

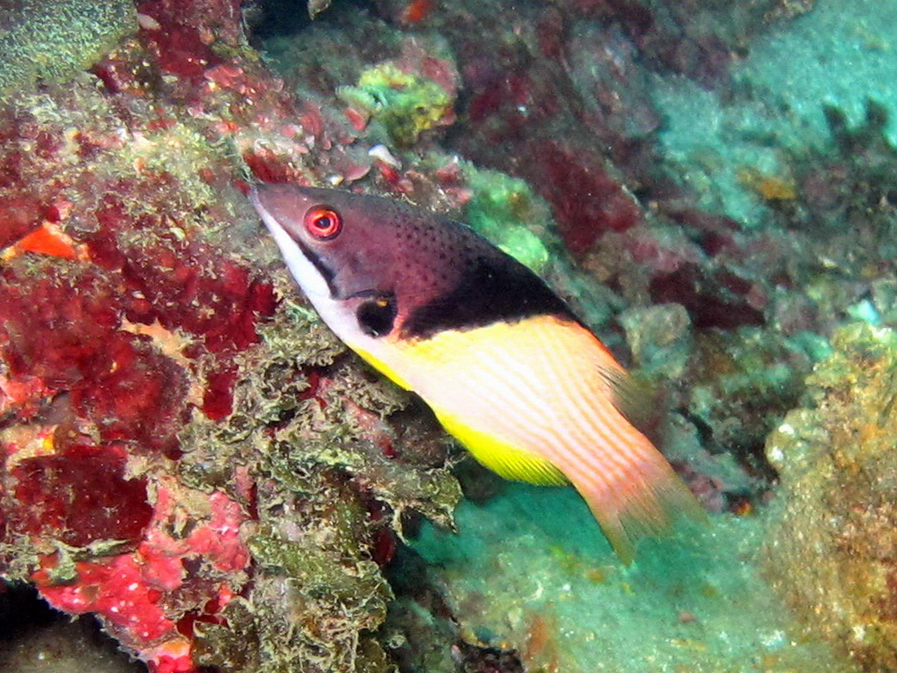
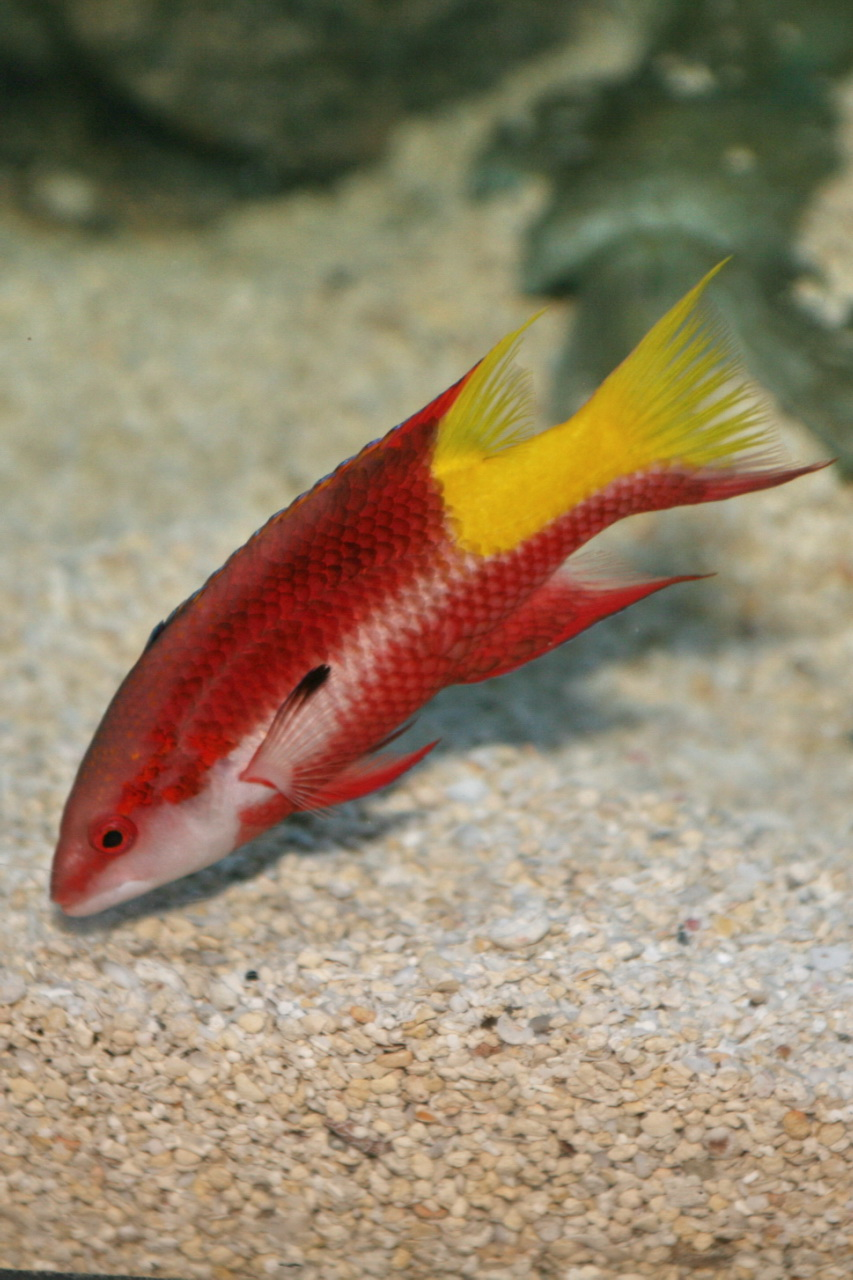
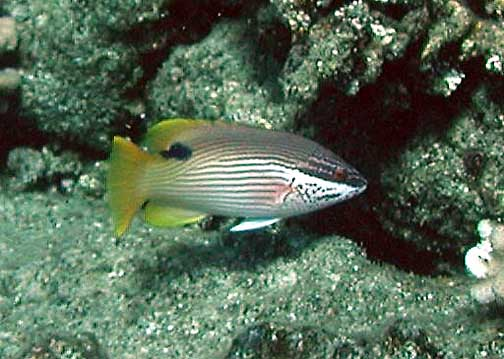
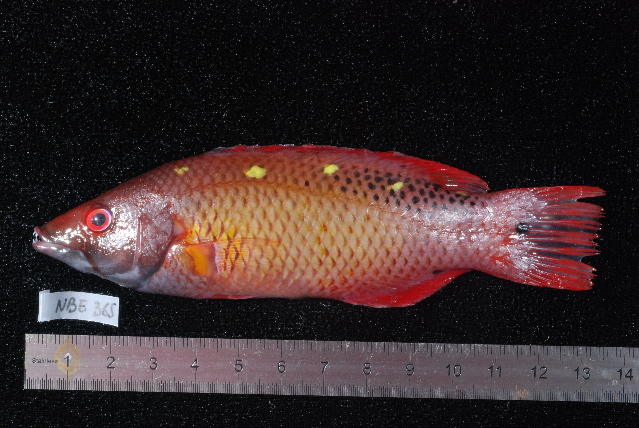
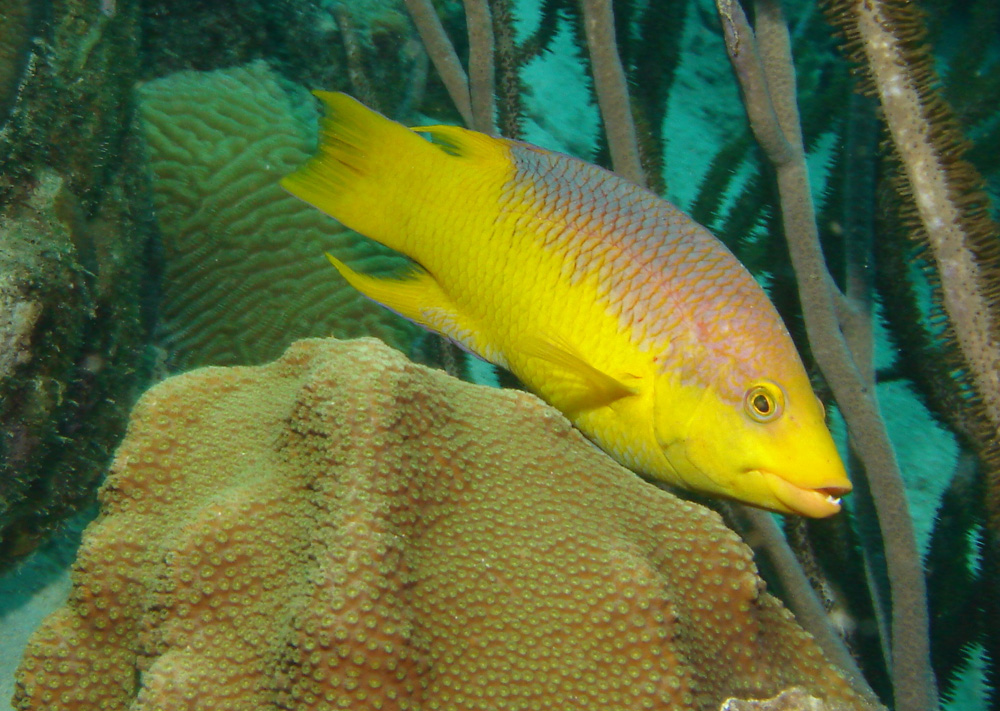
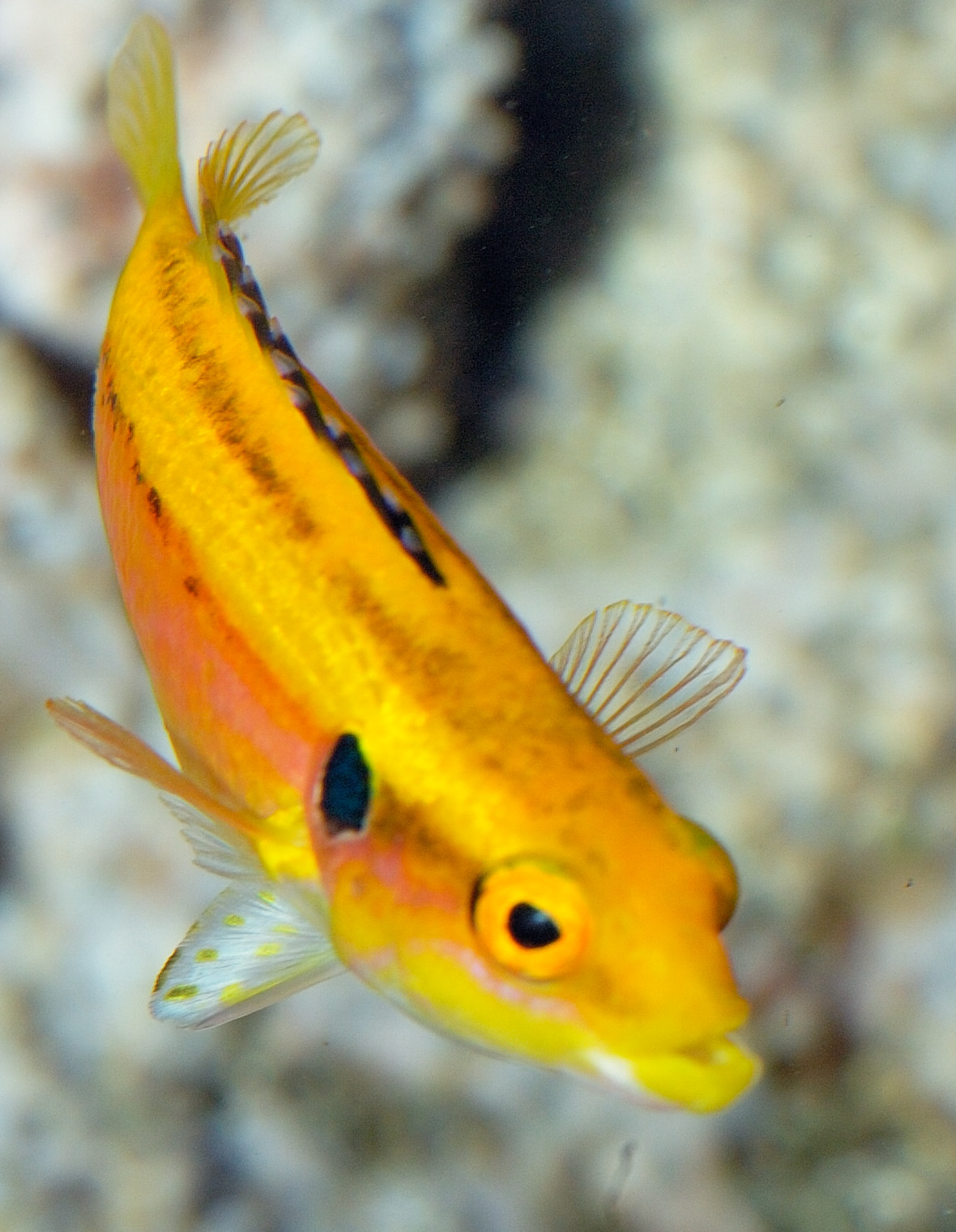
Common name	Image	Taxonomy	Reef safe	Description	Max size
Coral hogfish		Bodianus mesothorax	No		20 cm (7.9 in)
Cuban hogfish		Bodianus pulchellus	Caution		28.5 cm (11.2 in)
Hawaiian hogfish		Bodianus bilunulatus	Caution		55 cm (21.7 in)
Red diana hogfish		Bodianus diana	No		60 cm (23.6 in)
Spanish hogfish		Bodianus rufus	No		40 cm (15.7 in)
Twin spot hogfish		Bodianus bimaculatus	No		10 cm (3.9 in)

== Idols ==
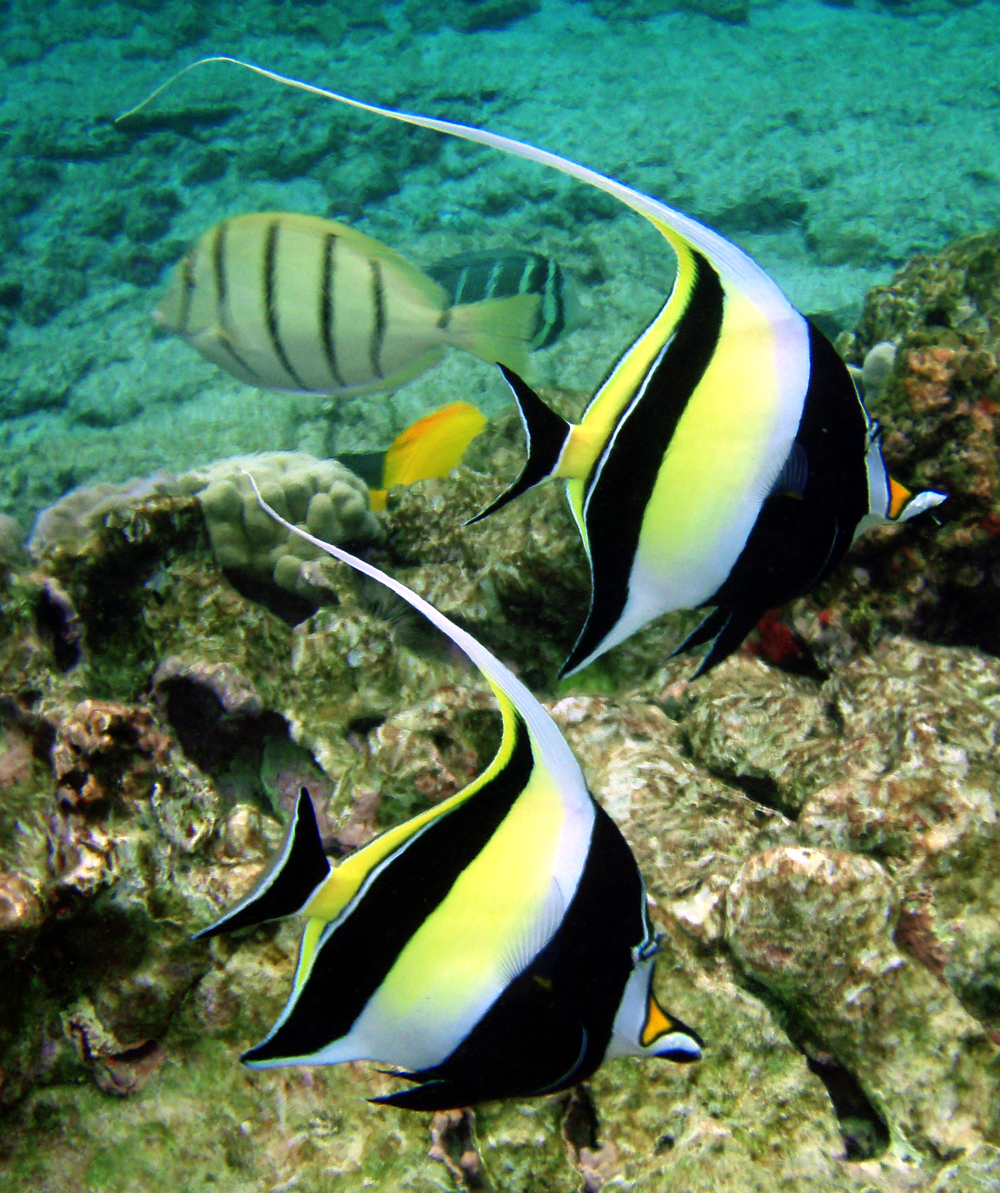
Moorish idol

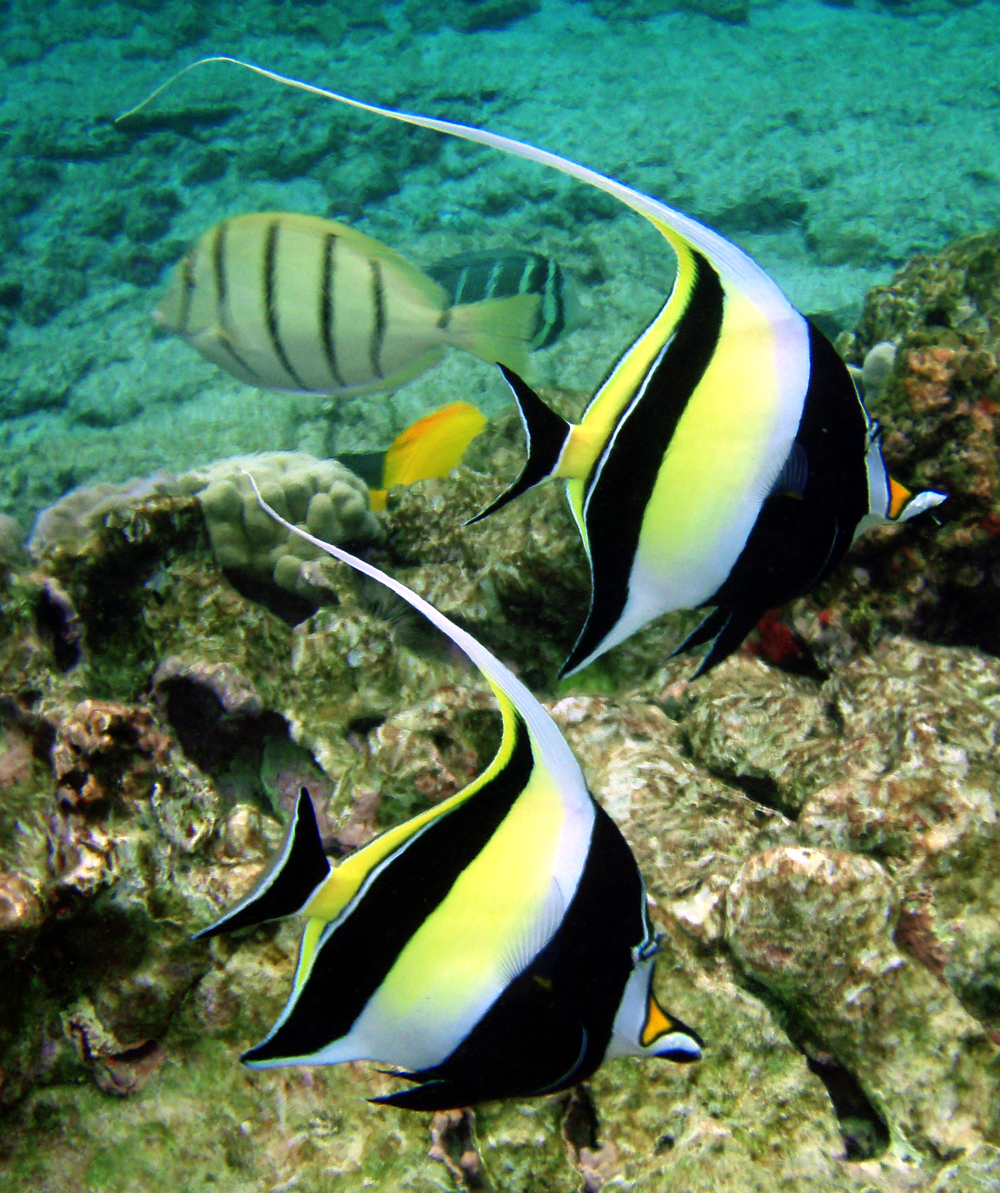
Common name	Image	Taxonomy	Reef safe	Description	Max size
Moorish idol		Zanclus cornutus	With Caution		23 cm (9.1 in)

== Jacks ==
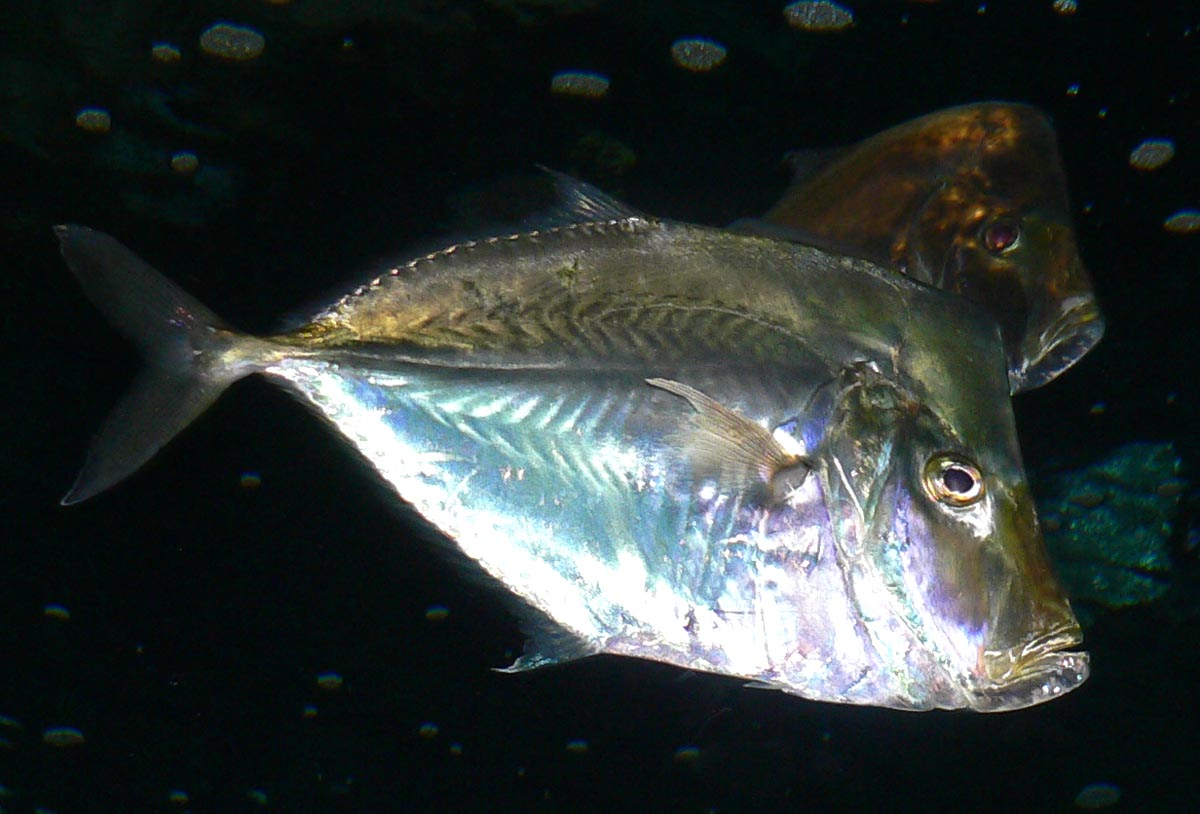
Lookdown

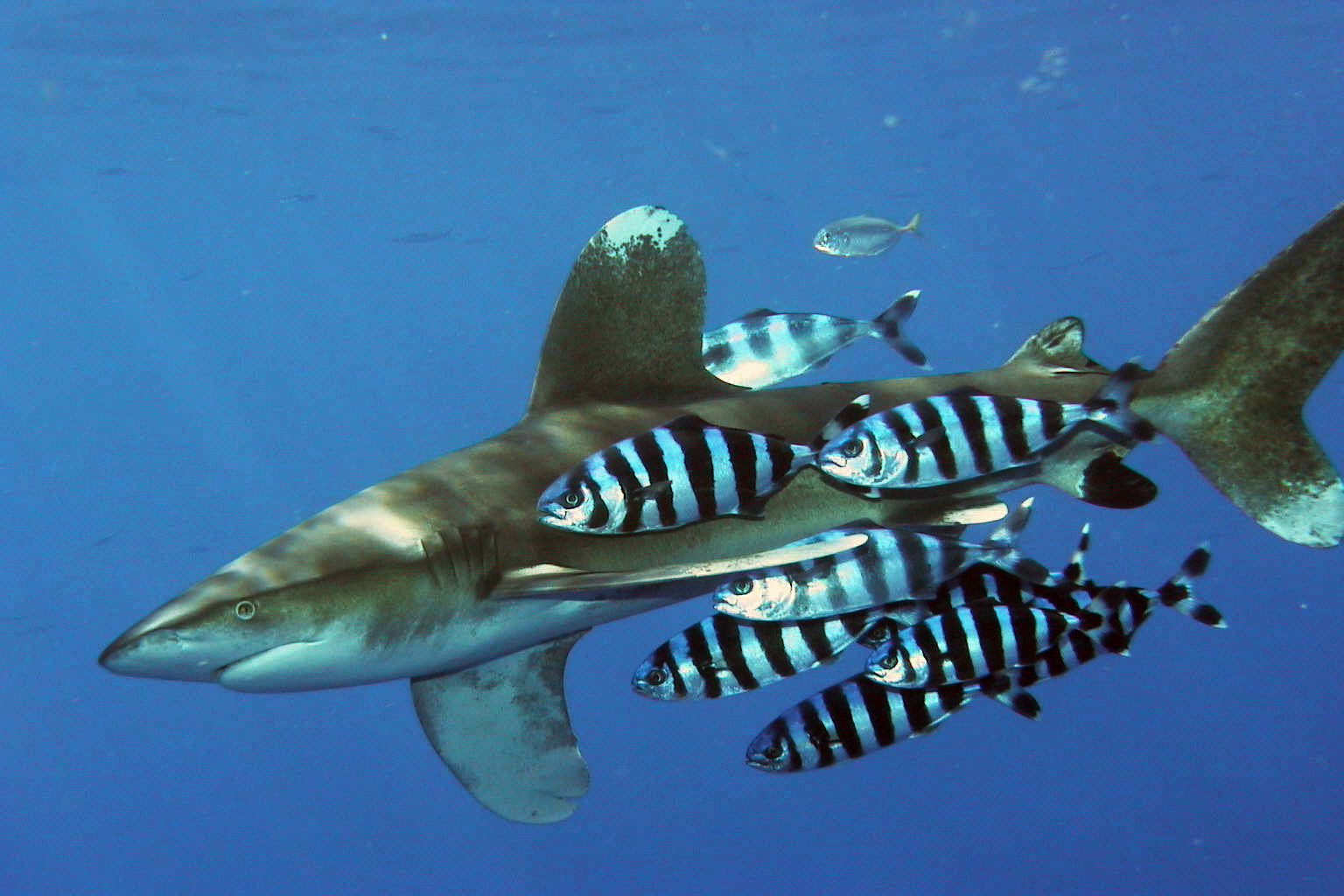
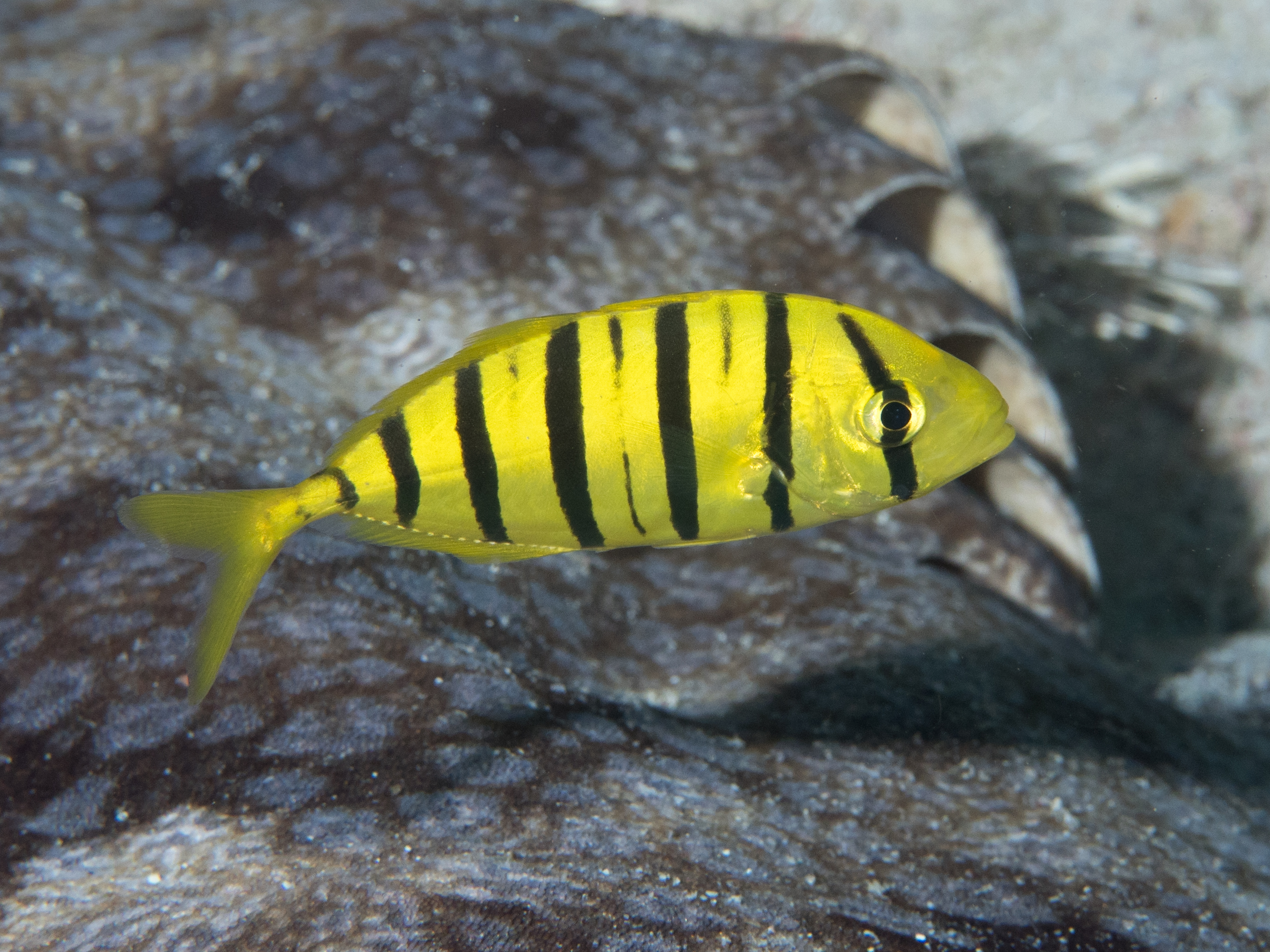
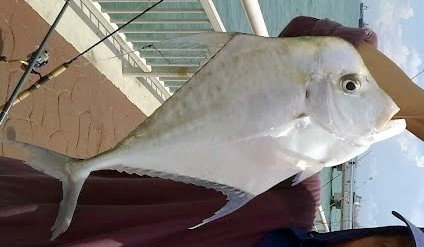
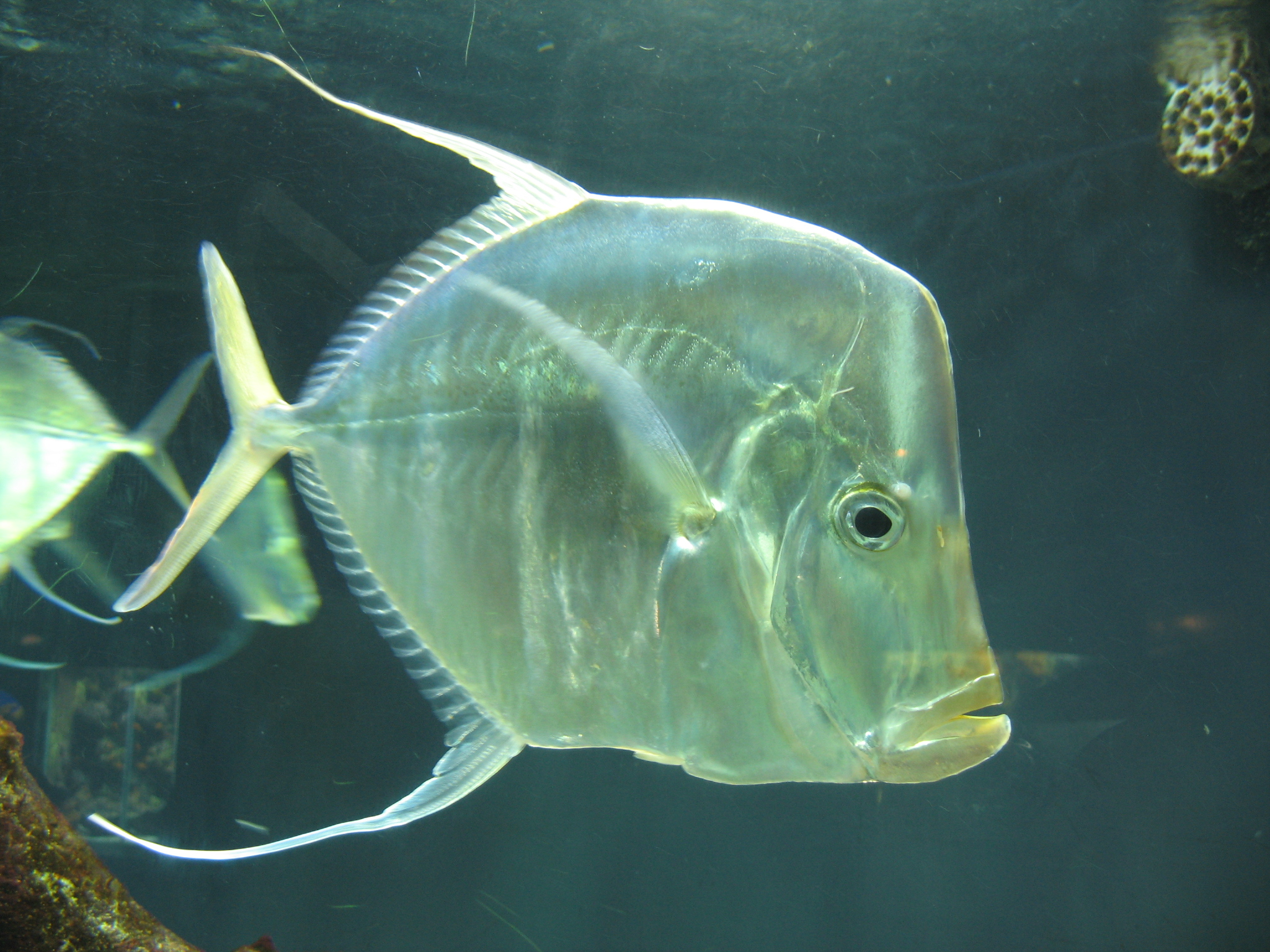
Common name	Image	Taxonomy	Reef safe	Description	Max size
Pilot fish		Naucrates ductor	?	Because they live in the open ocean, they are rare in the aquarium trade. They host sharks, rays, and sea turtles and eat food scraps, ectoparasites, and possibly the feces of their host. Juvenile Golden trevally are occasionally sold as Pilot fish. In the picture, the Pilot fish are hosting an Oceanic whitetip shark.	70 cm (27.6 in)
Golden trevally		Gnathanodon speciosus	No
Indian threadfin		Alectis indicus	No		165 cm (65.0 in)
Threadfin lookdown		Selene vomer	No		48 cm (18.9 in)

== Jawfish ==
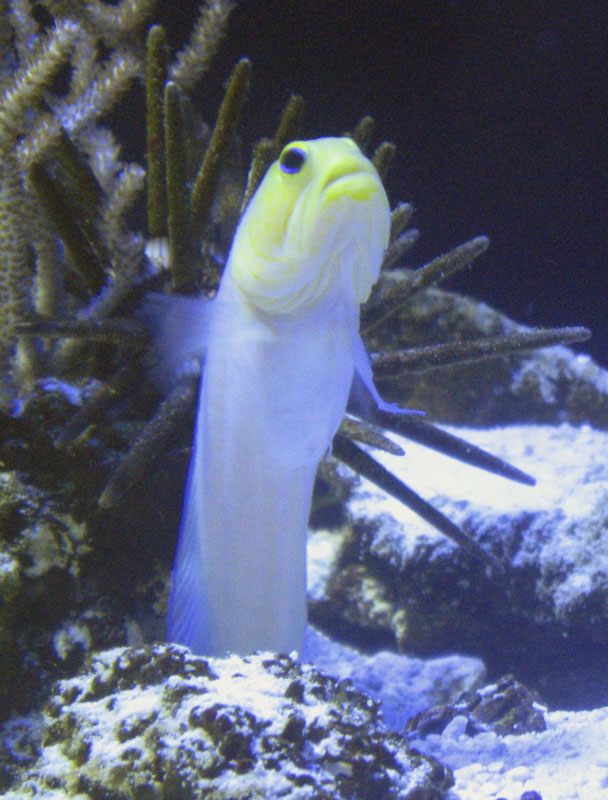
Yellowhead jawfish

Jawfish are burrowers and require a sandy substrate of sufficient depth.

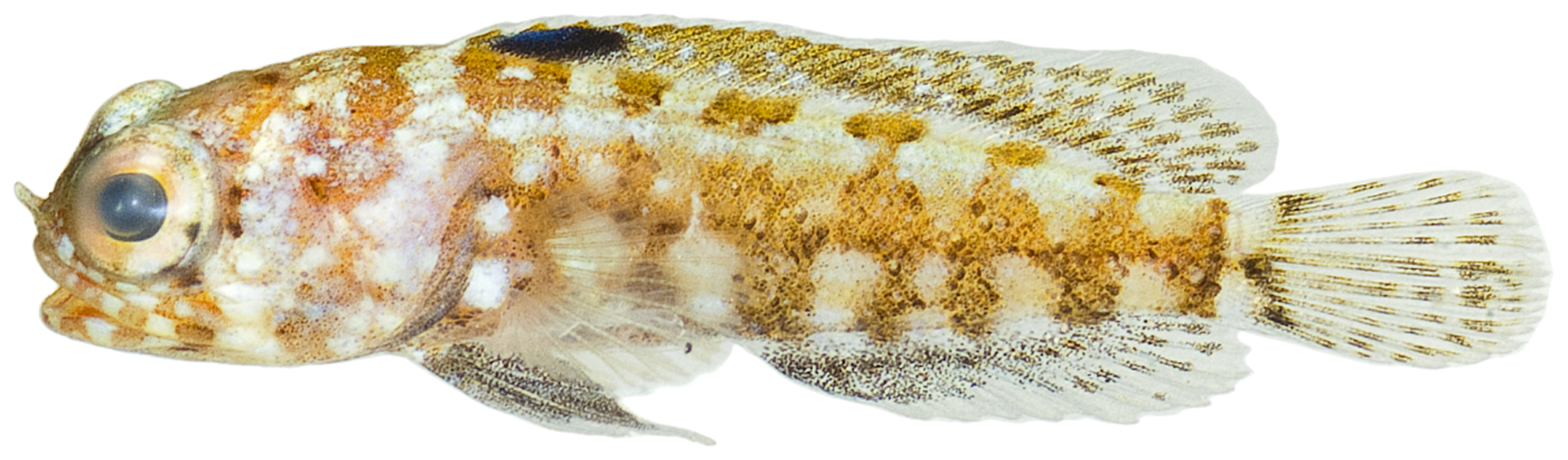
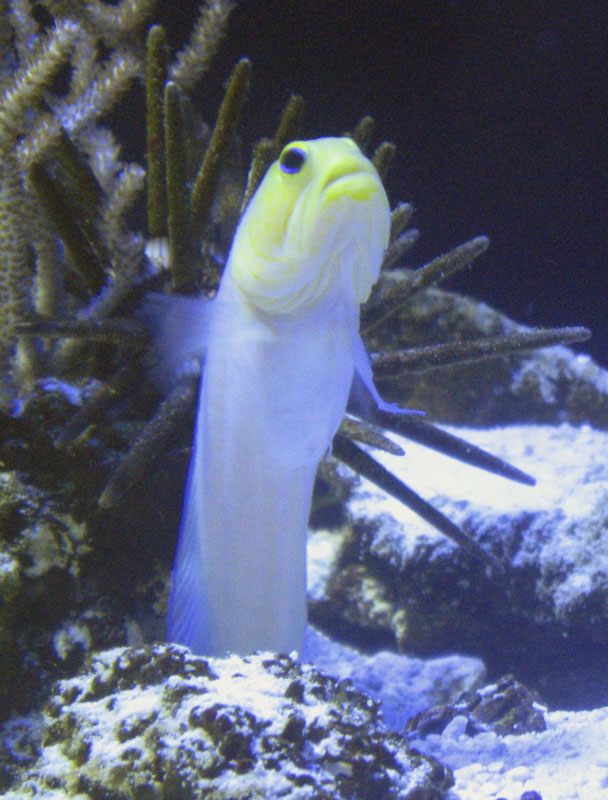
Common name	Image	Taxonomy	Reef safe	Description	Max size
Black cap jawfish		Opistognathus lonchurus	Almost always	Requires a 30-gallon tank and 3 inches (7.6 cm) substrate. Tank should remain tightly lidded. May eat small shrimp.	10 cm (3.9 in)
Blue dot jawfish		Opistognathus rosenblatti	Yes		9 cm (3.5 in)
Dusky jawfish		Opistognathus whitehurstii	Yes	Requires a 30-gallon tank and 3 inches (7.6 cm) sand substrate. Tank should remain tightly lidded.	14 cm (5.5 in)
Yellowhead jawfish		Opistognathus aurifrons	Yes	Requires a 30-gallon tank and 5–7 inches (13–18 cm) soft substrate. Tank should remain tightly lidded.	10 cm (3.9 in)

== Lionfish ==
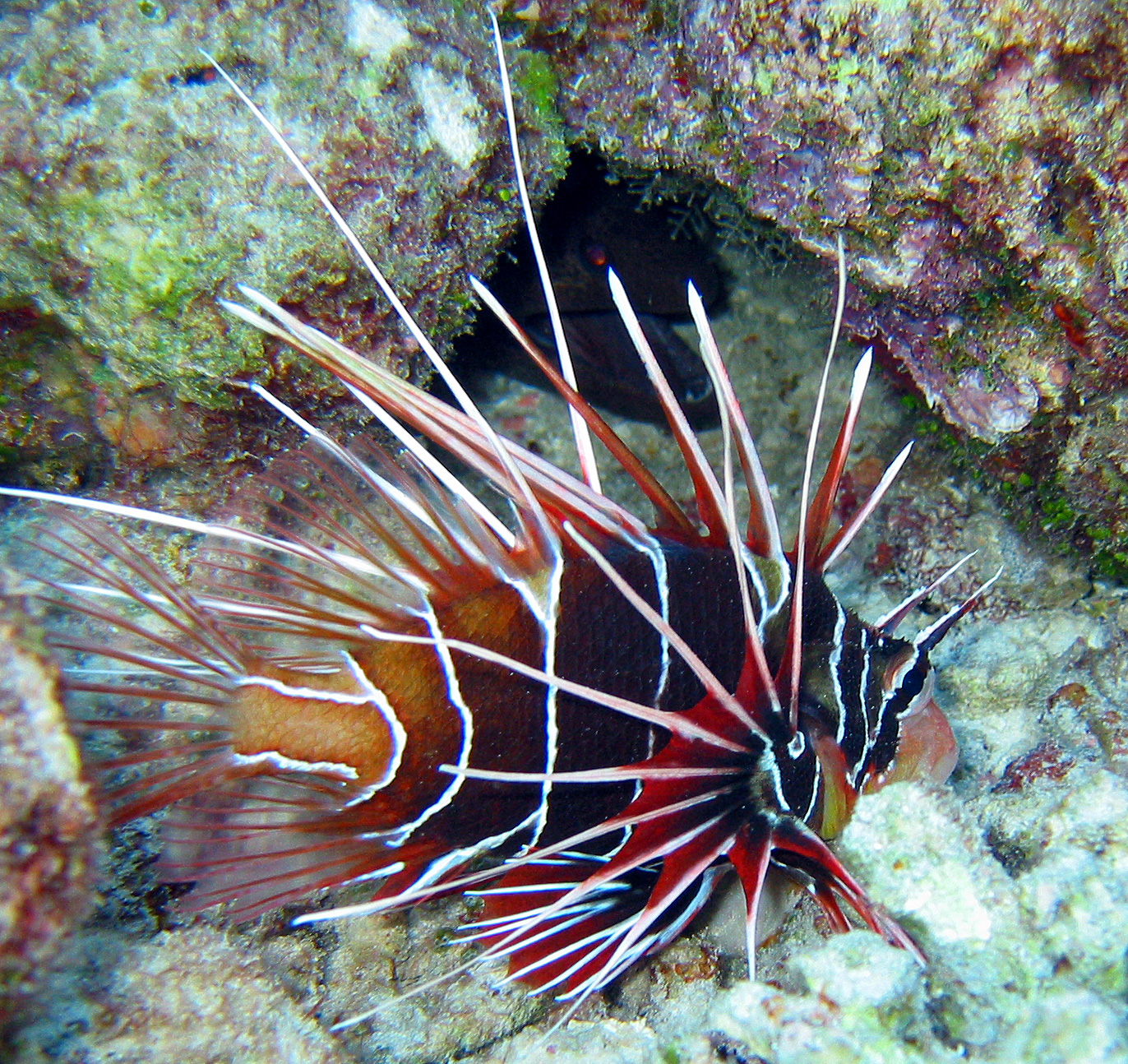
Radiata lionfish

"Lionfish" specifically refer to the genus Pterois within the family Scorpaenidae. They have venomous spines and should be treated with caution. Other species within Scorpaenidae but outside Pterois may also have "lionfish" in their common names. Feeder goldfish are not the proper nutrition for a lion fish.

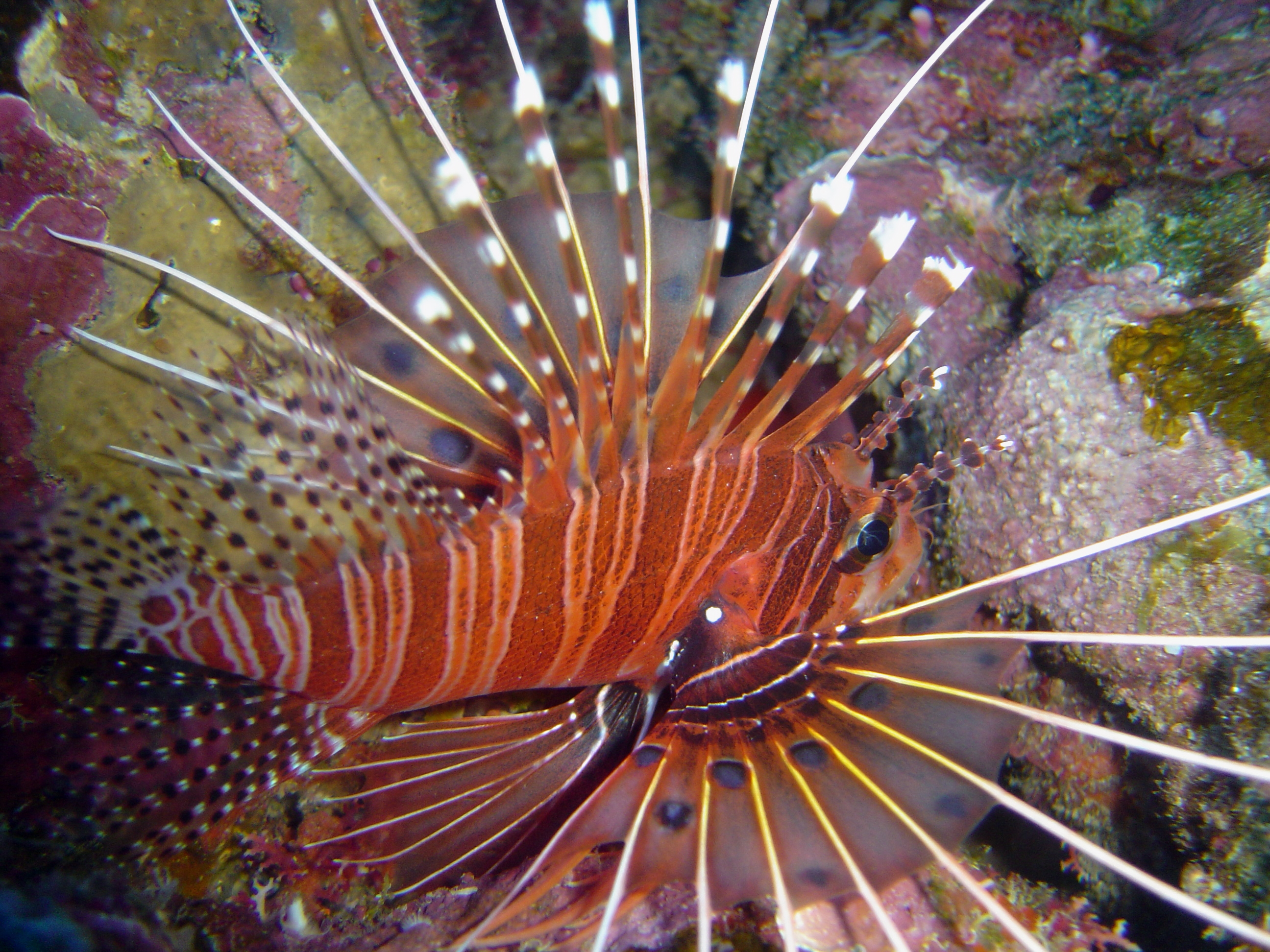
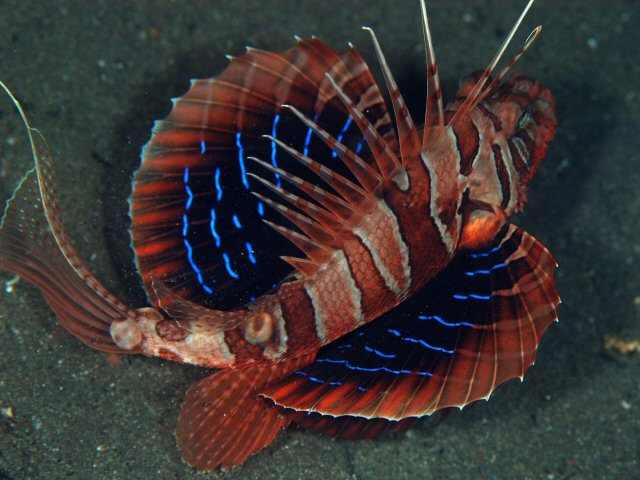
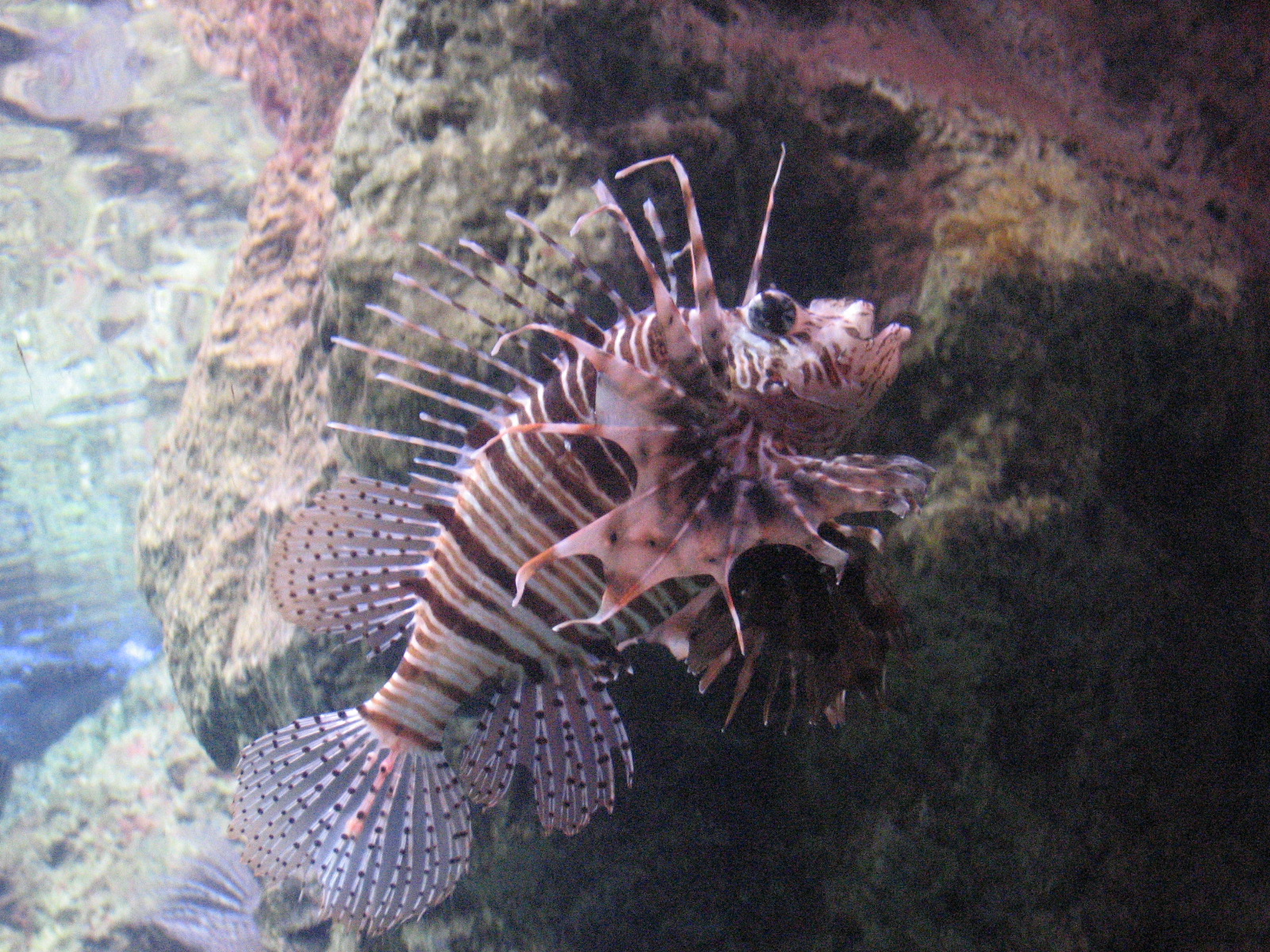
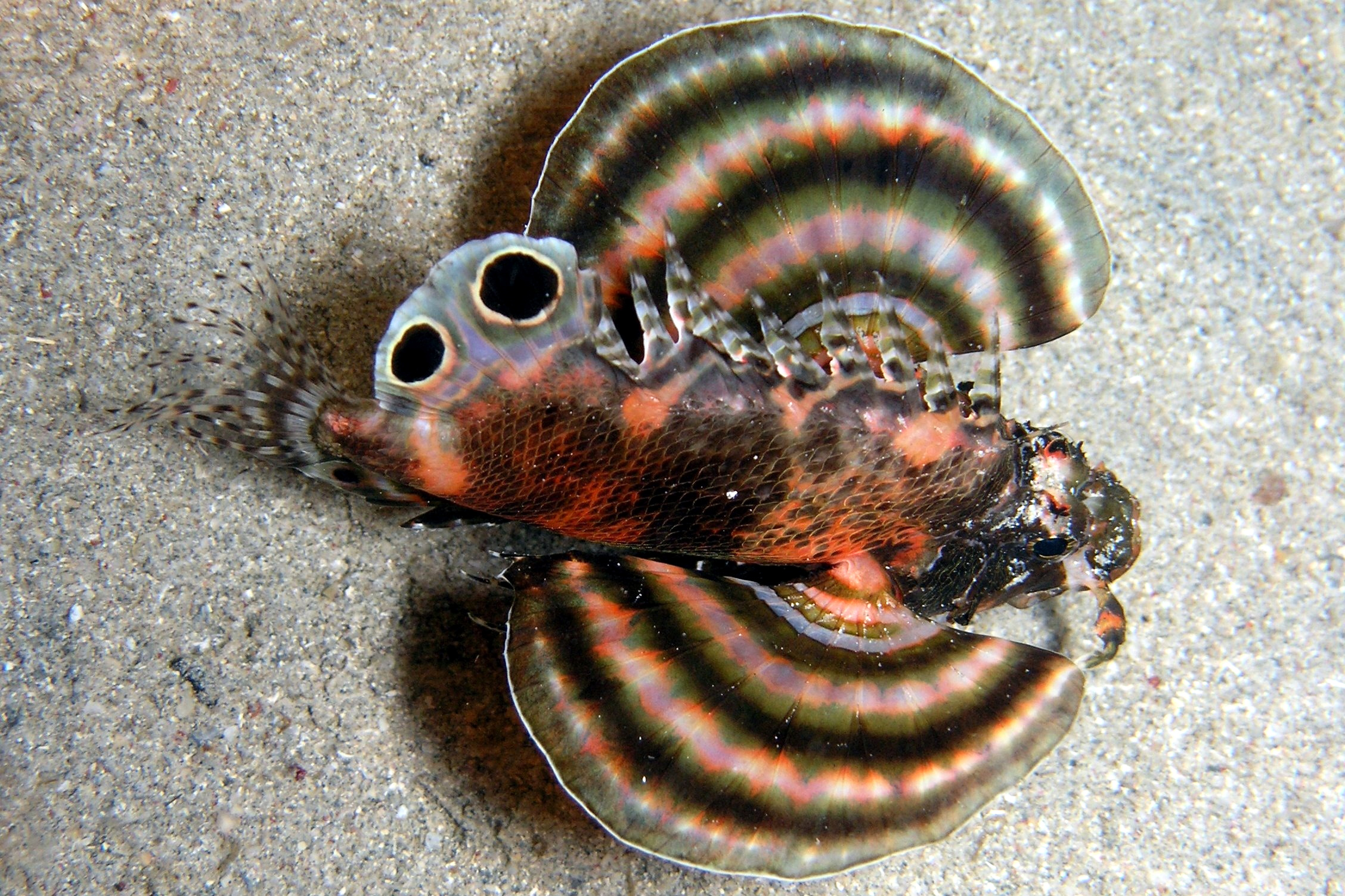
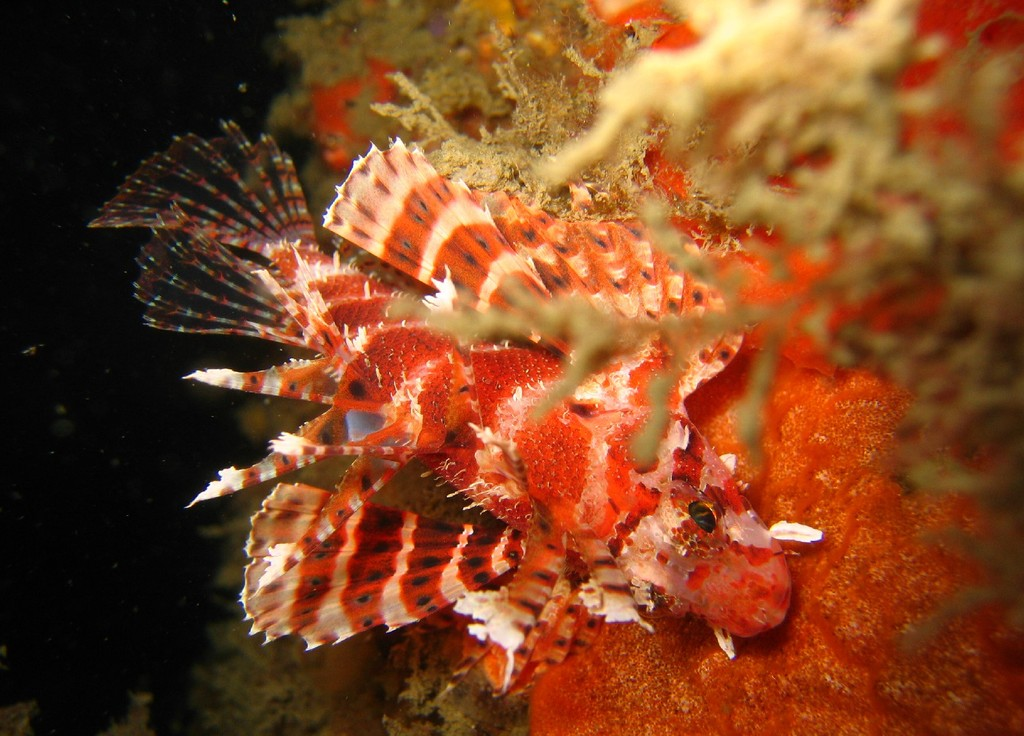
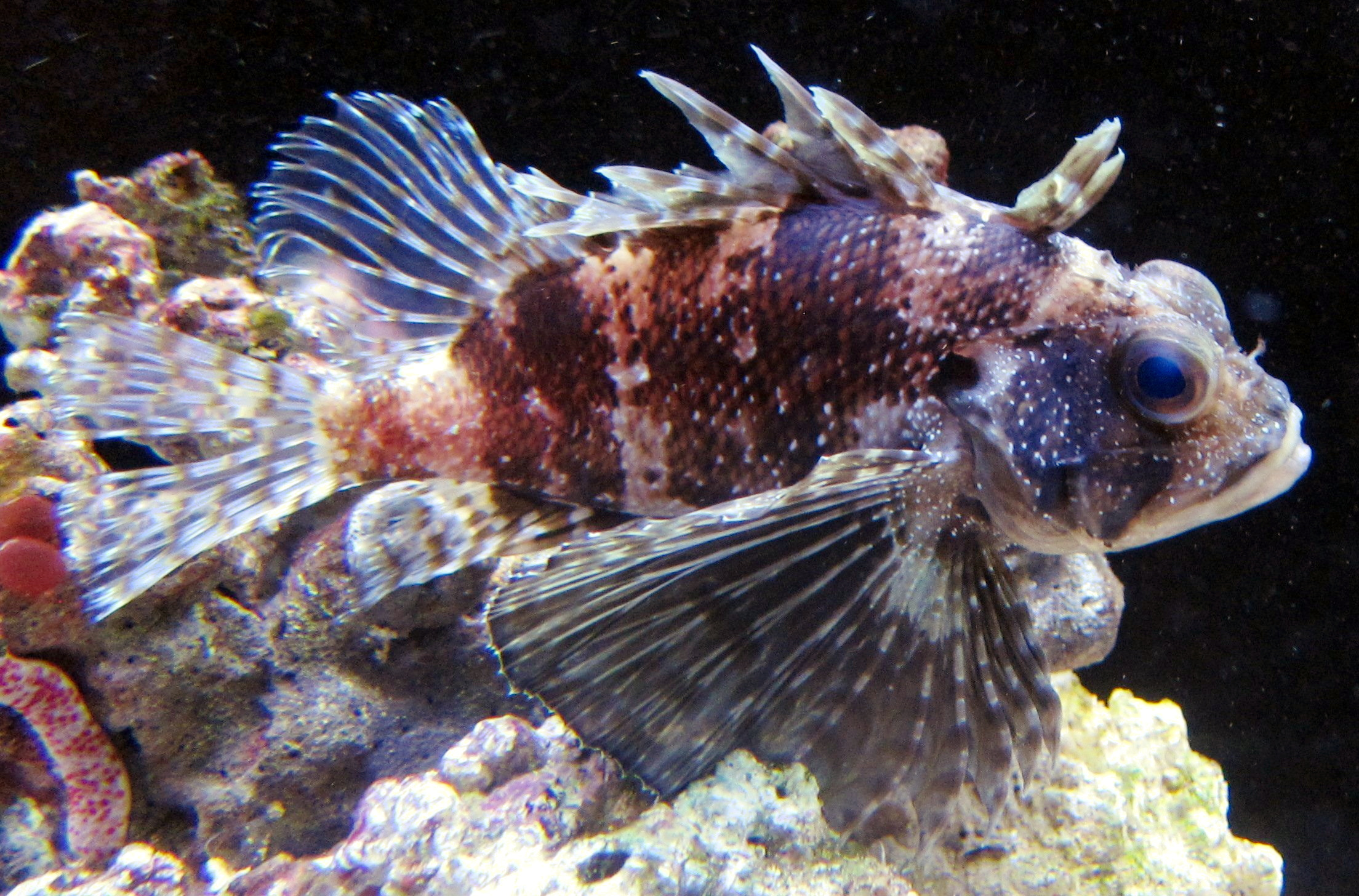
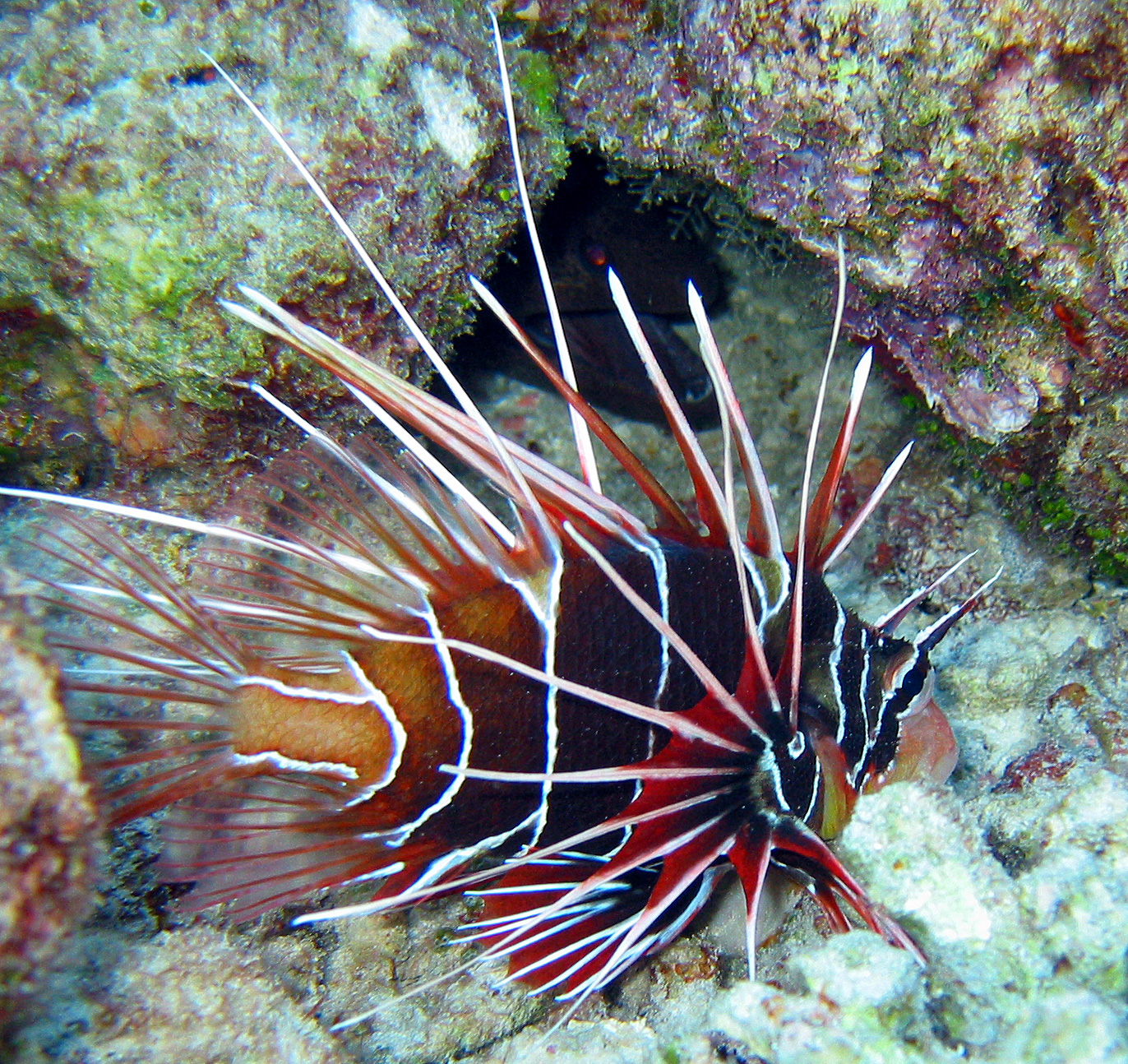
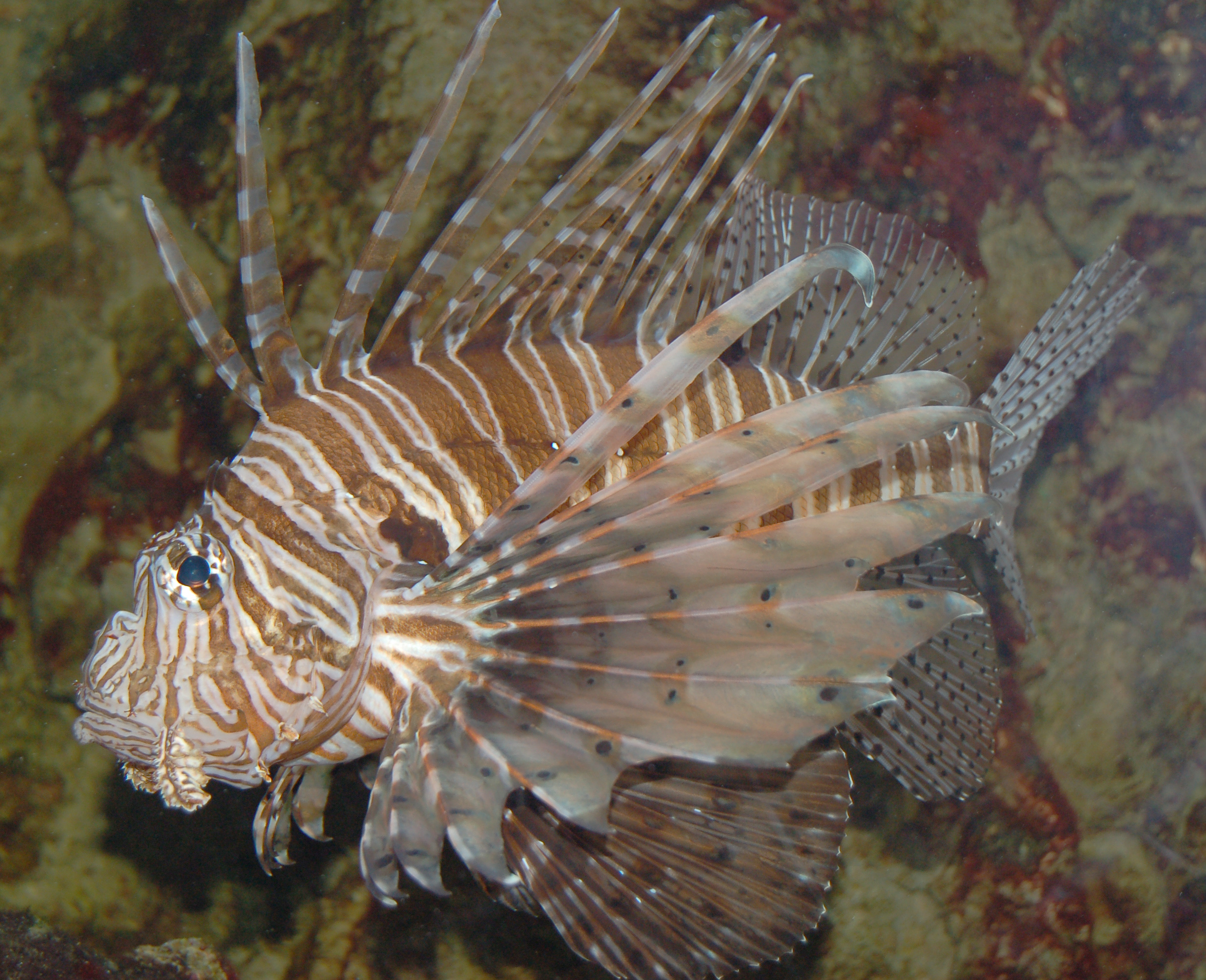
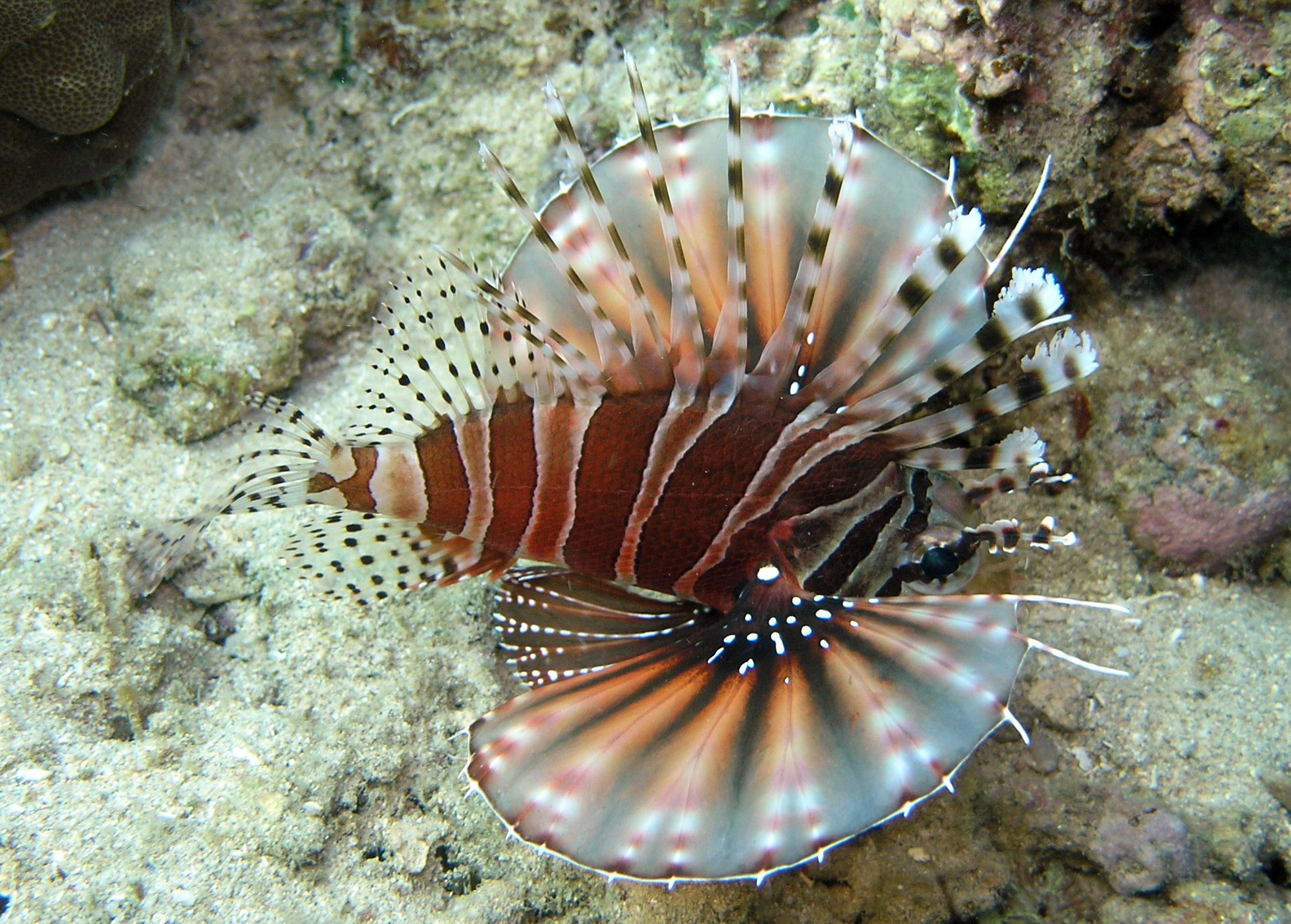
Common name	Image	Taxonomy	Reef safe	Description	Max size
Antenneta lionfish		Pterois antennata	Caution		20 cm (7.9 in)
Blackfoot lionfish		Parapterois heterura	Caution		23.0 cm (9.1 in)
Devil lionfish		Pterois mombasae	Caution		20 cm (7.9 in)
Fu Man Chu lionfish		Dendrochirus biocellatus	Caution		13.0 cm (5.1 in)
Fuzzy dwarf lionfish		Dendrochirus brachypterus	Caution	Carnivore; Males 6< stripes on pectoral fin females >6	18 cm (7.1 in)
Green lionfish		Dendrochirus barberi	Caution		16.5 cm (6.5 in)
Radiata lionfish		Pterois radiata			24 cm (9.4 in)
Russell's lionfish		Pterois russelii			30 cm (11.8 in)
Volitan lionfish		Pterois volitans	Caution	Semi-aggressive; carnivore	43 cm (16.9 in)
Zebra lionfish		Dendrochirus zebra	Caution		25 cm (9.8 in)

== Parrotfish ==
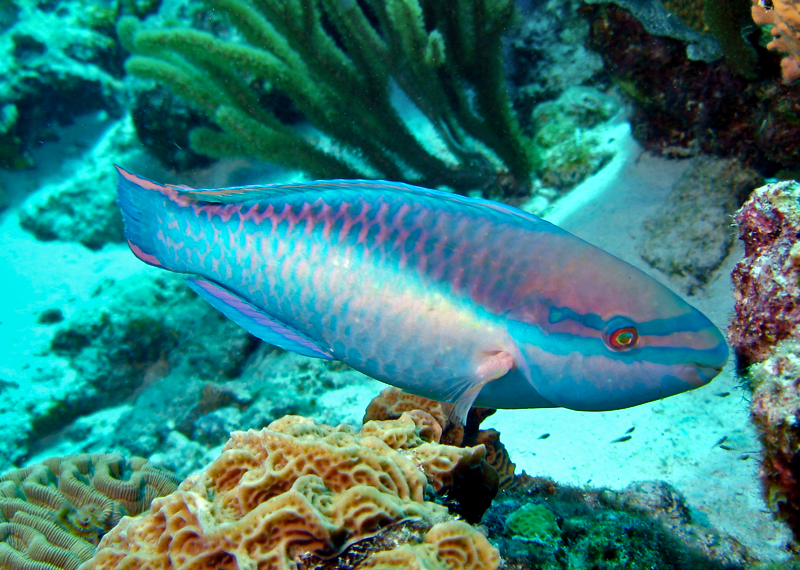
Princess parrotfish

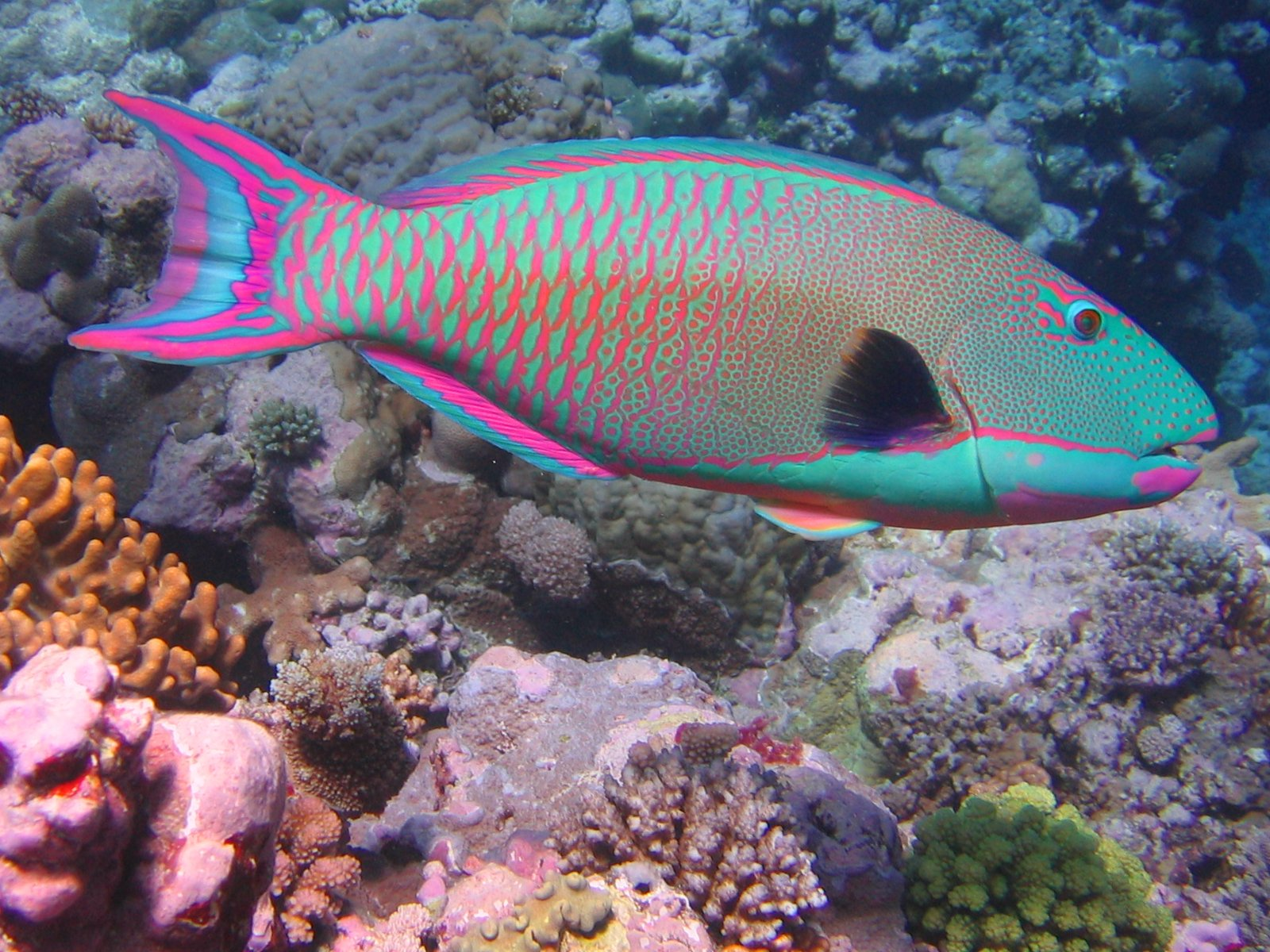
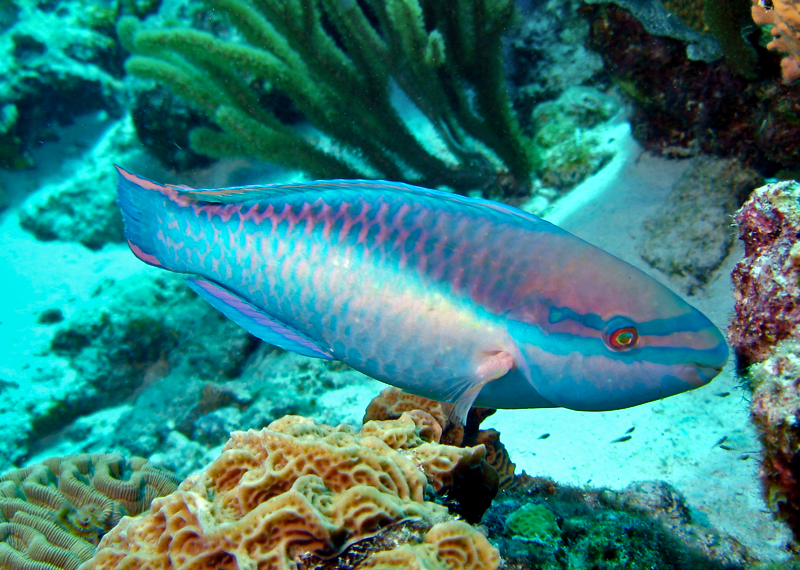
Common name	Image	Taxonomy	Reef safe	Description	Max size
Bicolor parrotfish		Cetoscarus bicolor	No		76 cm (29.9 in)
Princess parrotfish		Scarus taeniopterus	No		25 cm (9.8 in)

== Pipefish ==
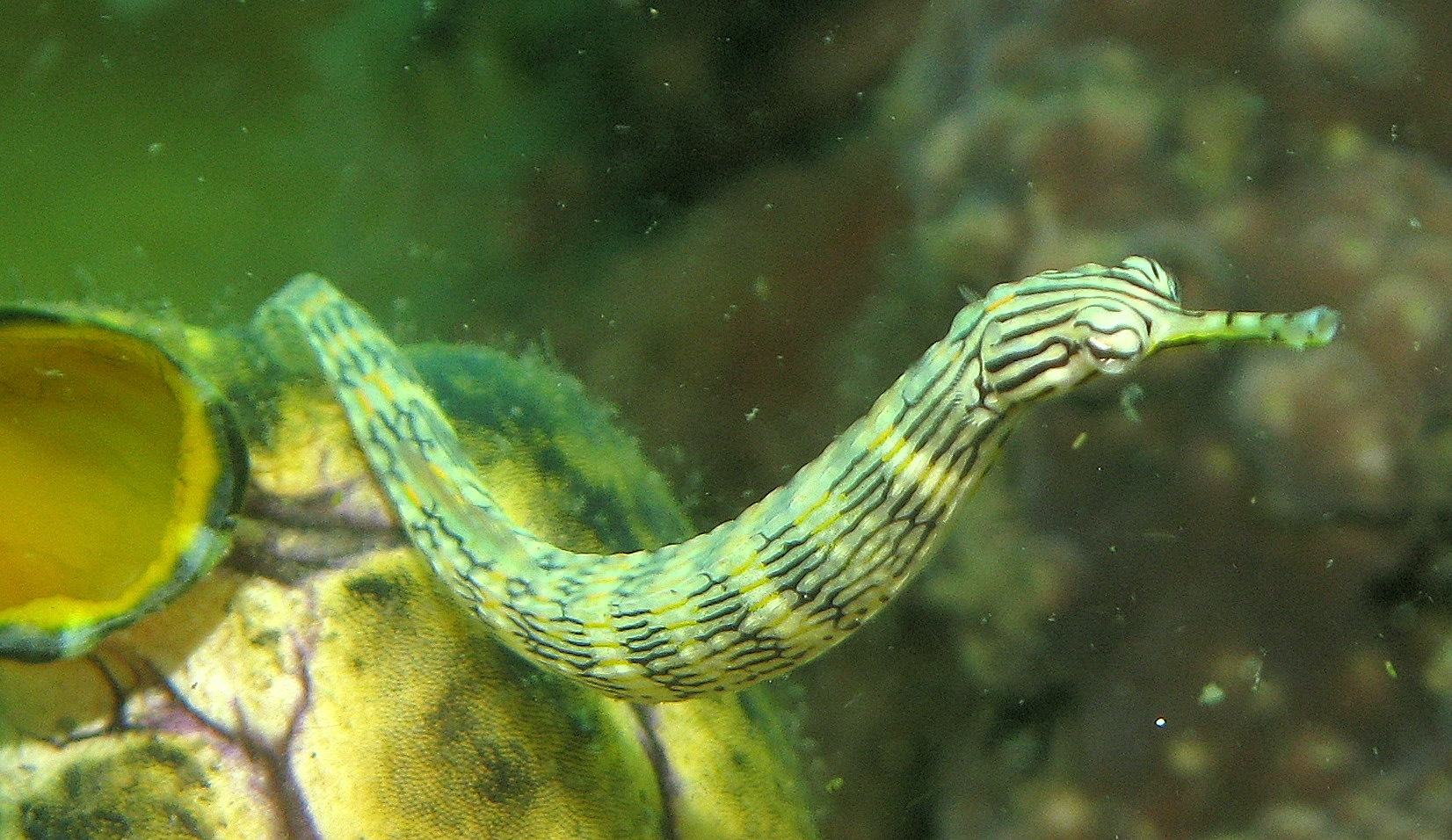
Messmate pipefish

Pipefish are relatives of seahorses and require a similar level of care. They should only be bought by experienced aquarium owners. Captive bred specimens are sometimes available, and are significantly more likely to survive.

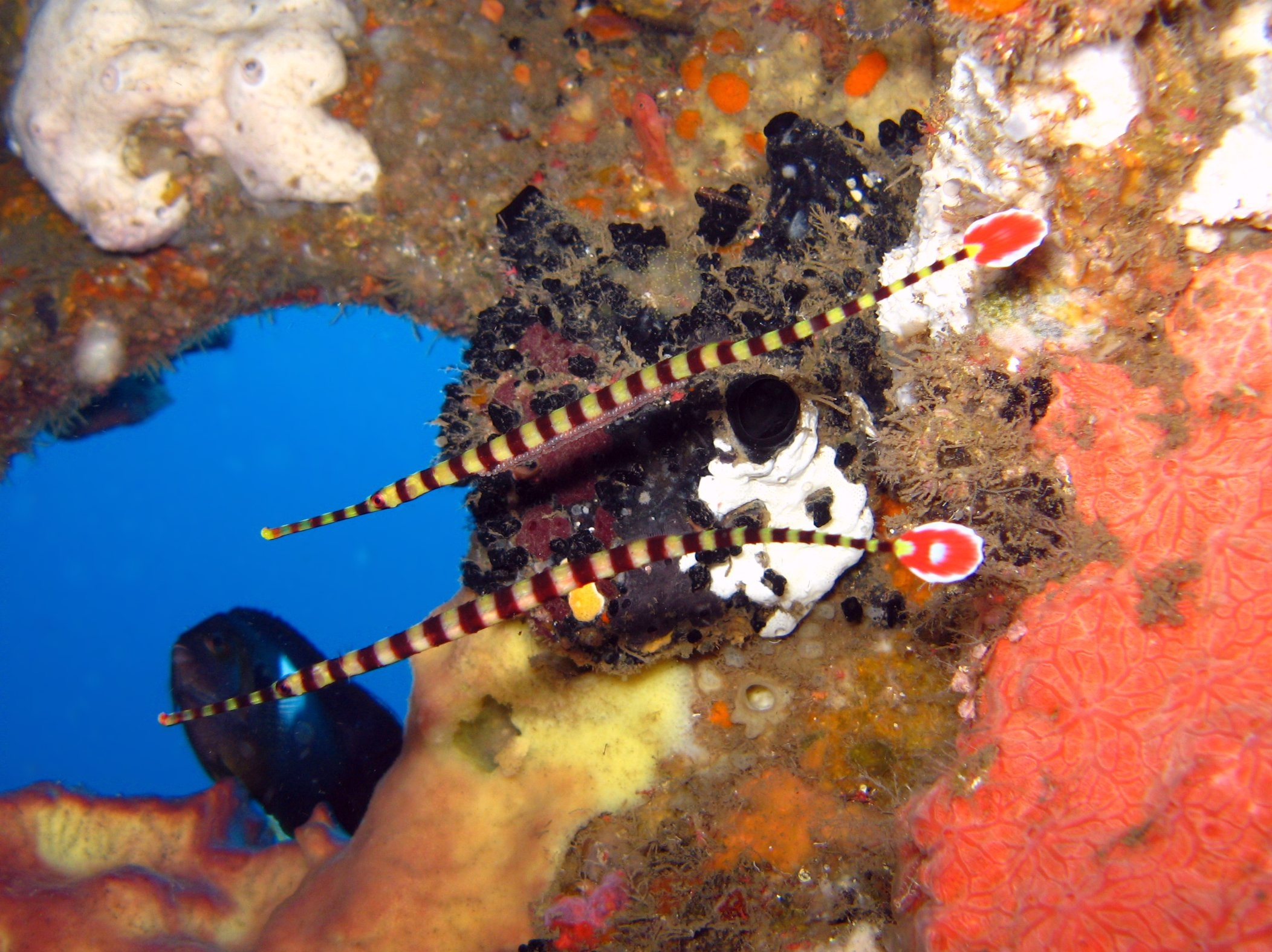
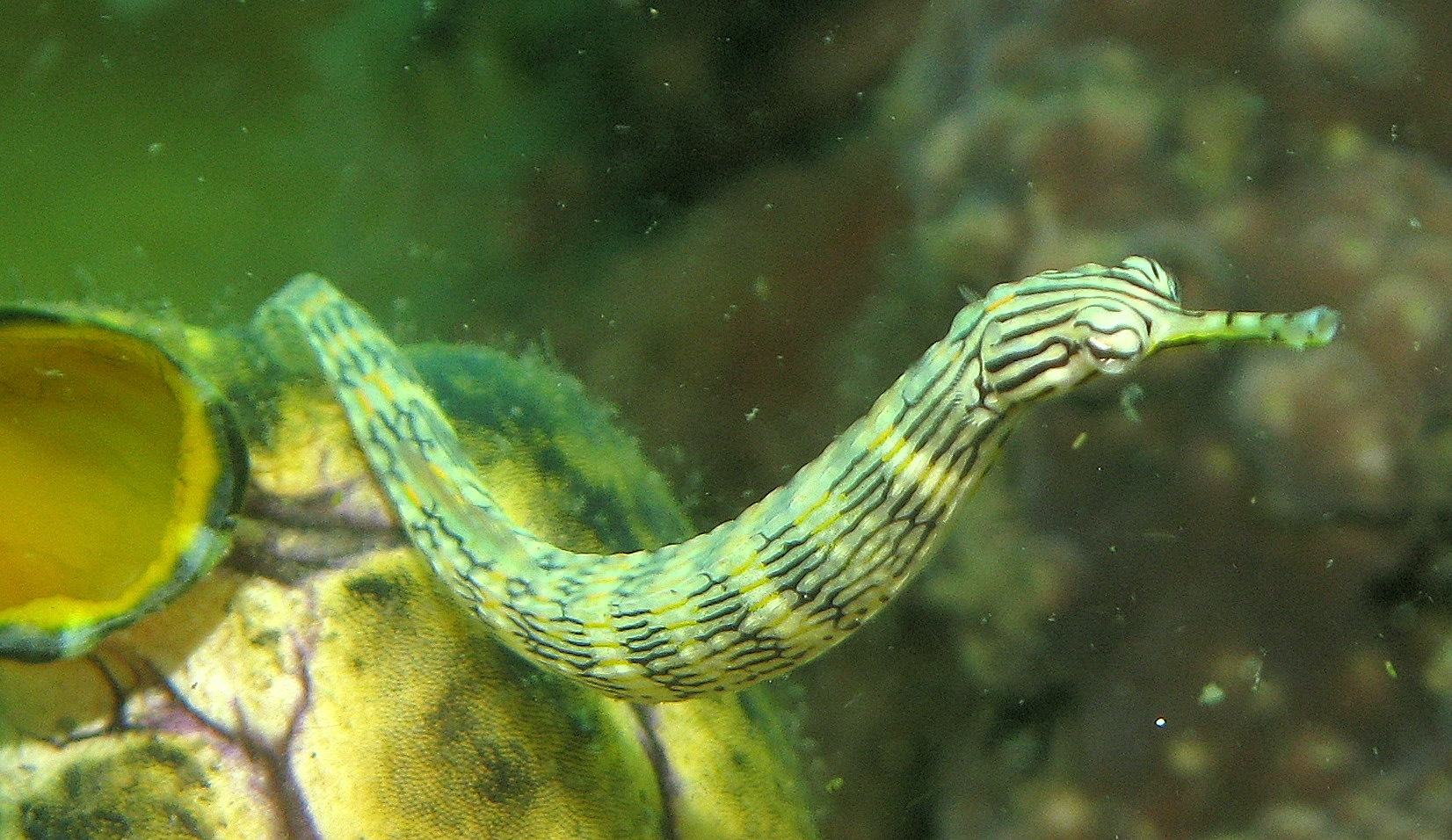
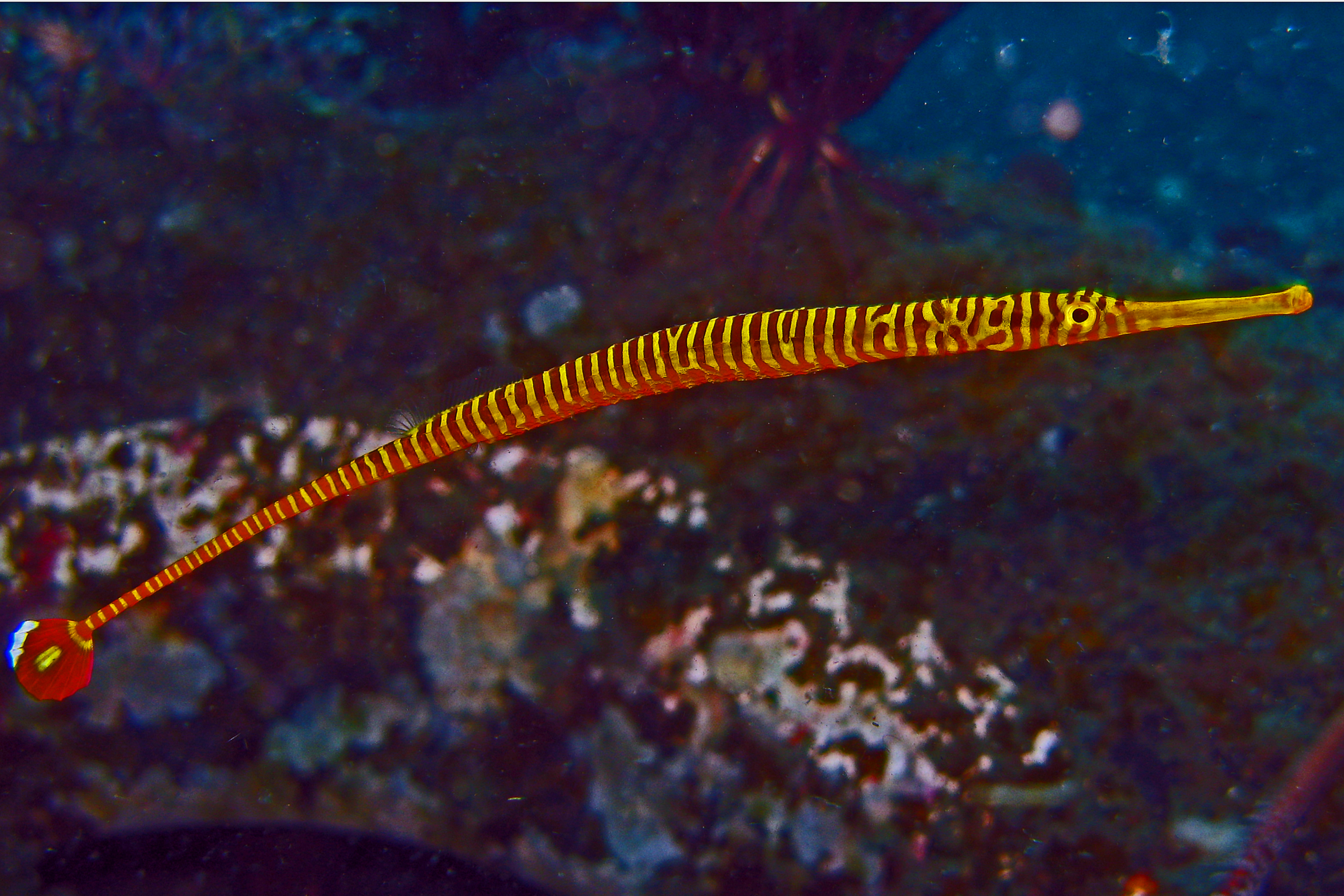
Common name	Image	Taxonomy	Reef safe	Description	Max size
Banded pipefish		Doryrhamphus dactyliophorus	Yes		20 cm (7.9 in)
Dragonface pipefish		Corythoichthys haematopterus	Yes		18 cm (7.1 in)
Janss' pipefish		Doryrhamphus janssi	Yes		20 cm (7.9 in)
Yellow multibanded pipefish		Doryrhamphus pessuliferus	Yes		18 cm (7.1 in)

== Pseudochromidae ==
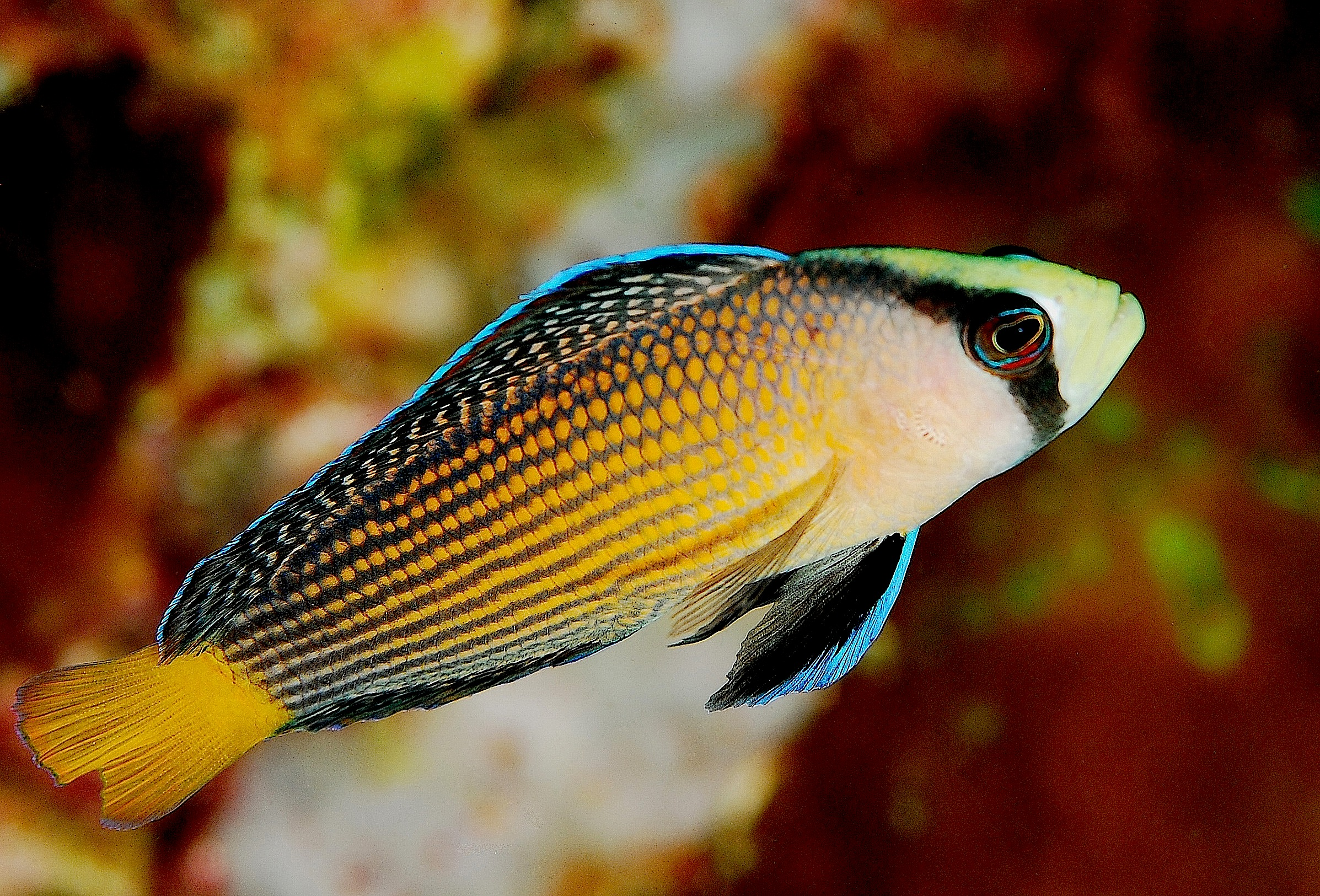
Splendid pseudochromis

Usually only a single specimen can be kept in an aquarium. Sometimes multiple specimens can be kept in larger aquariums, but usually this requires them to be added at the same time or they will be too territorial.

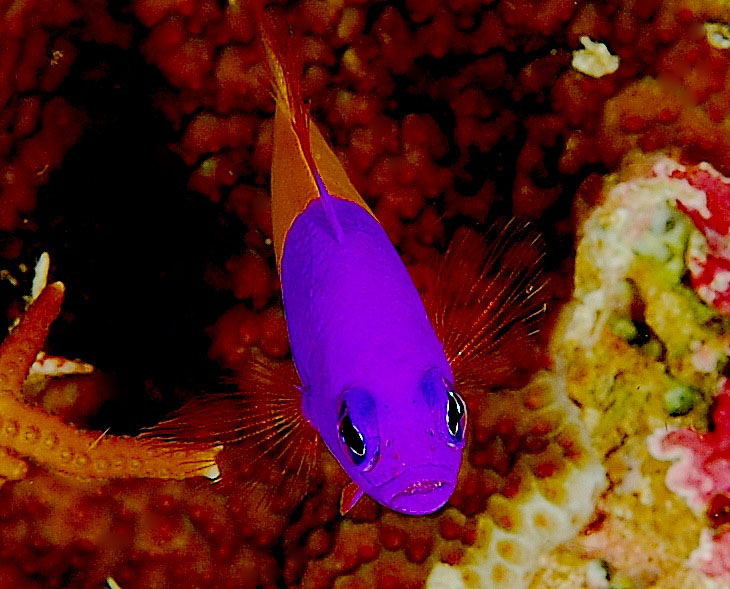
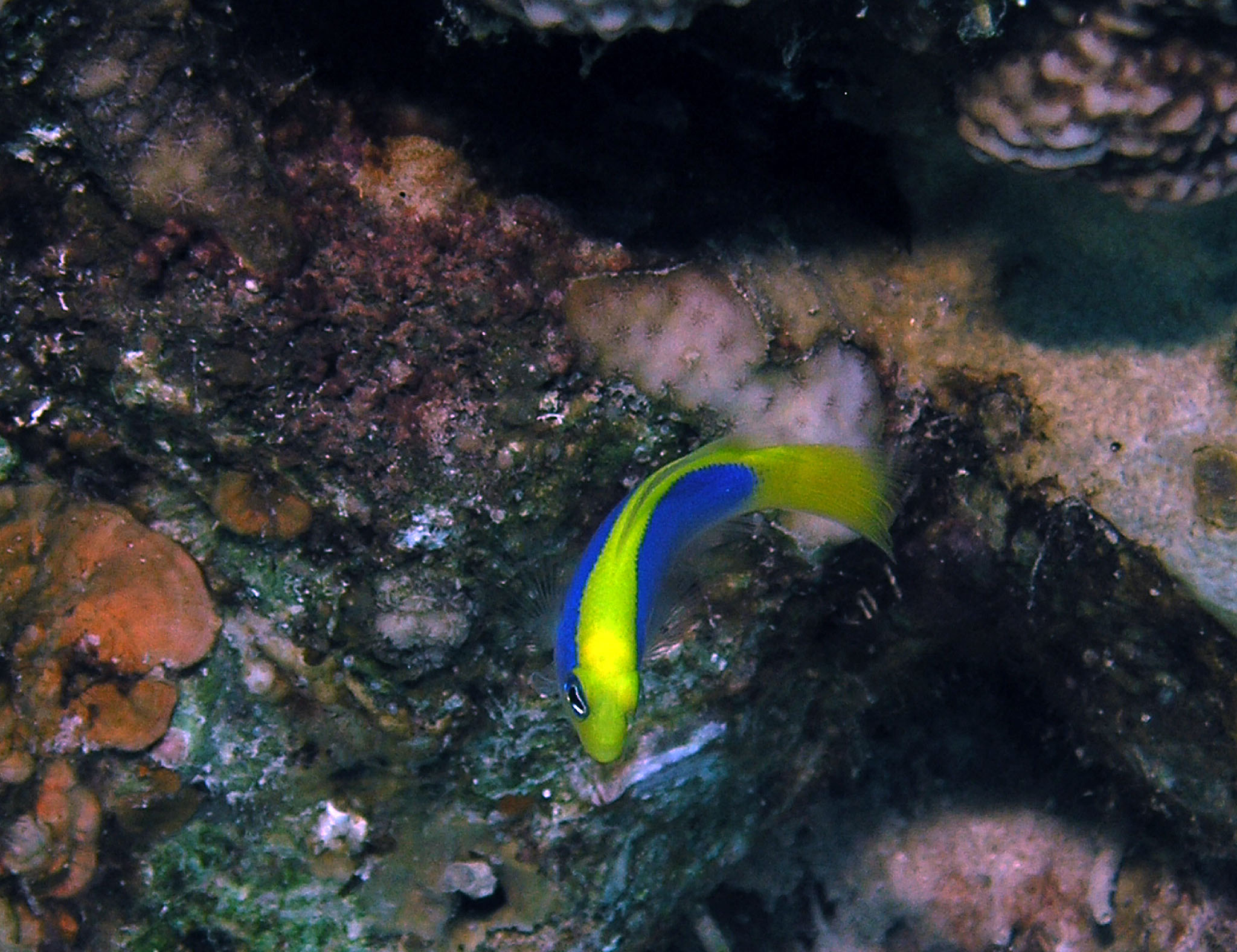
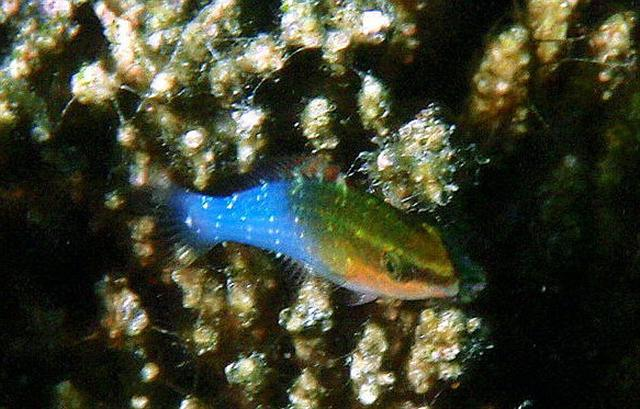
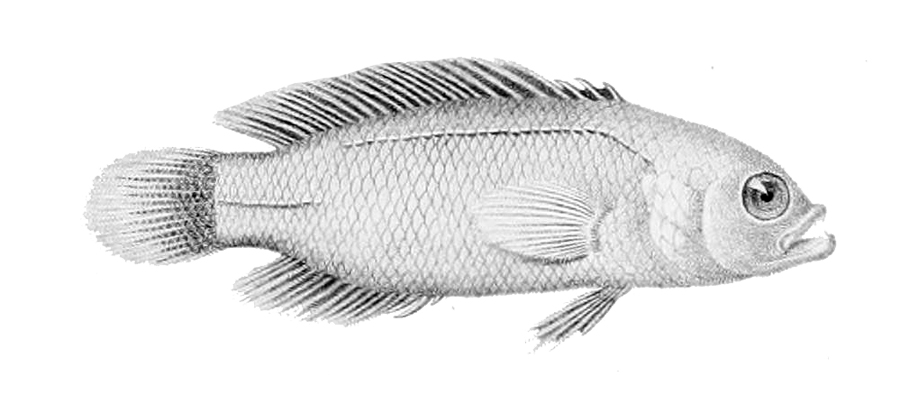
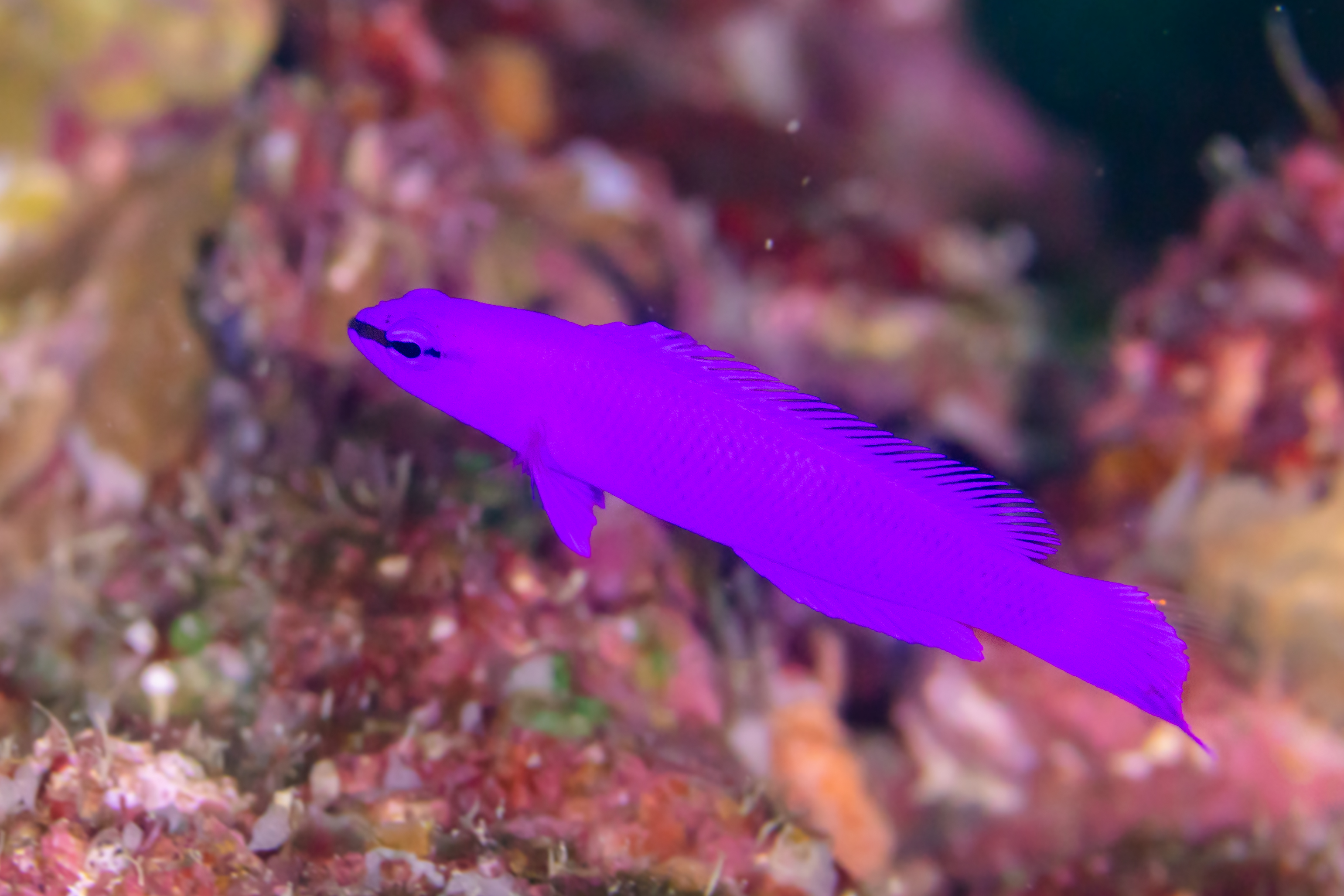
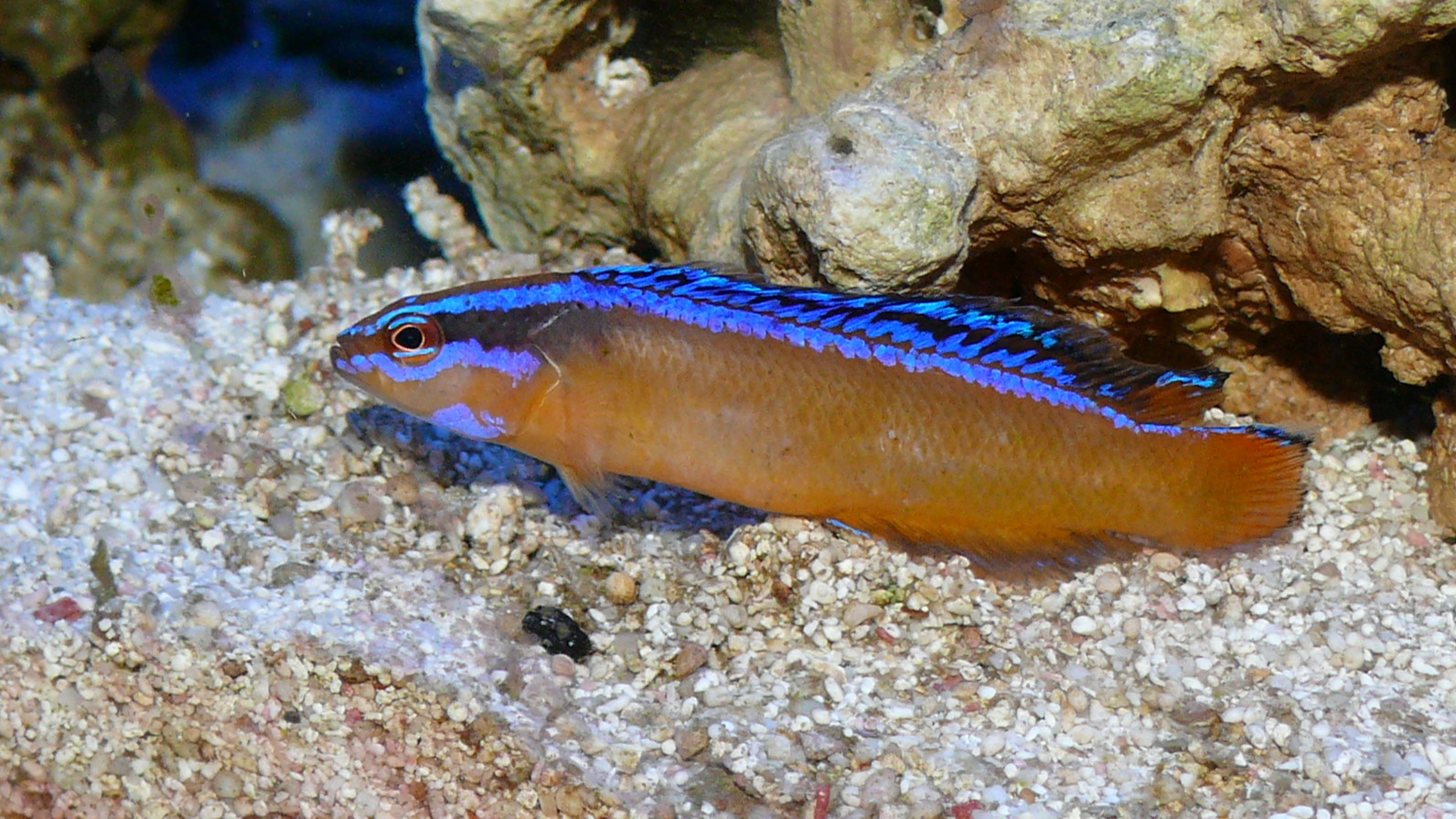
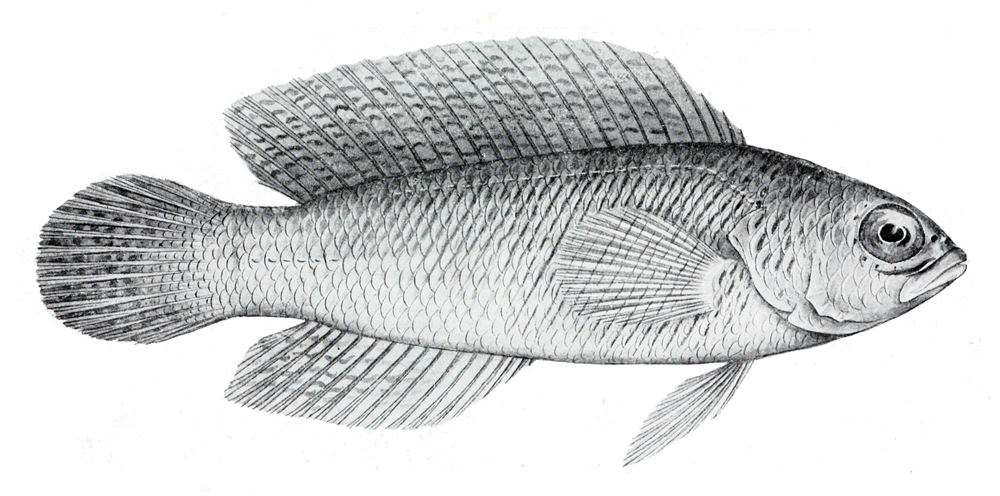
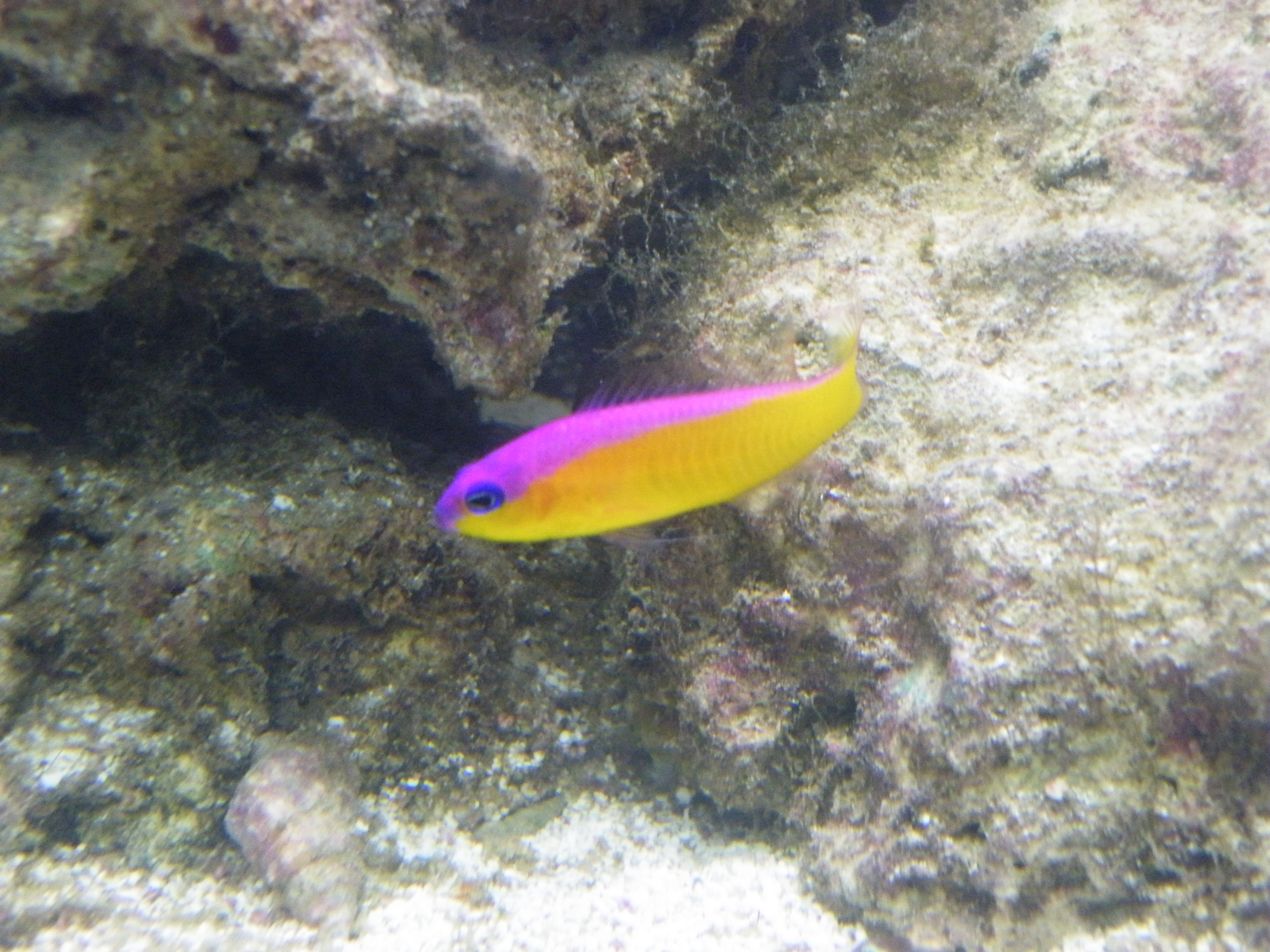
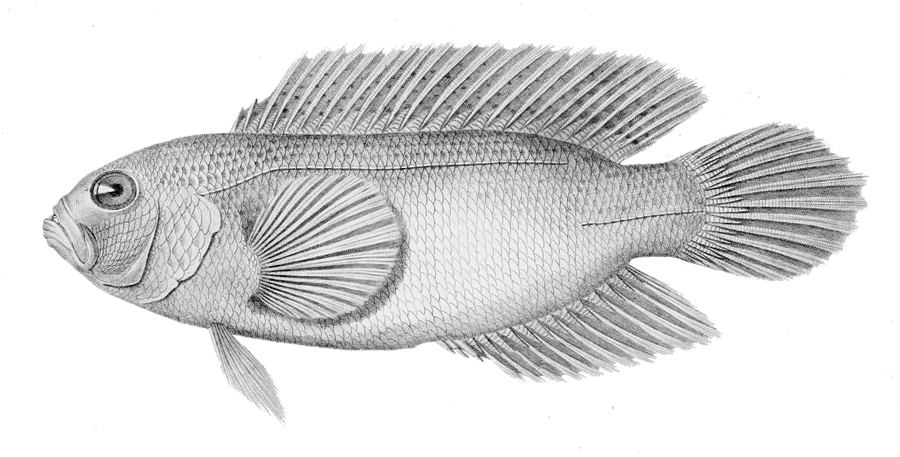
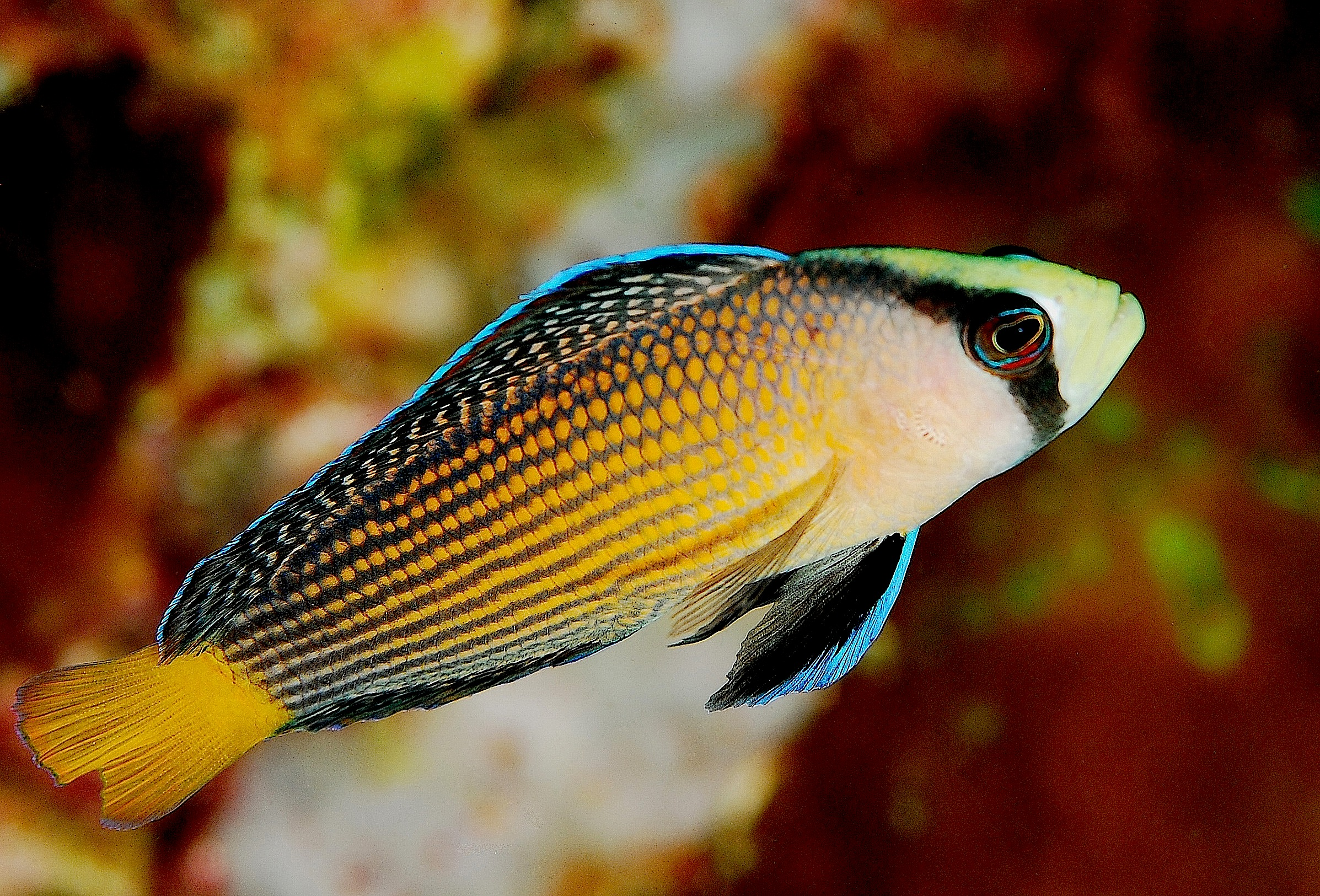
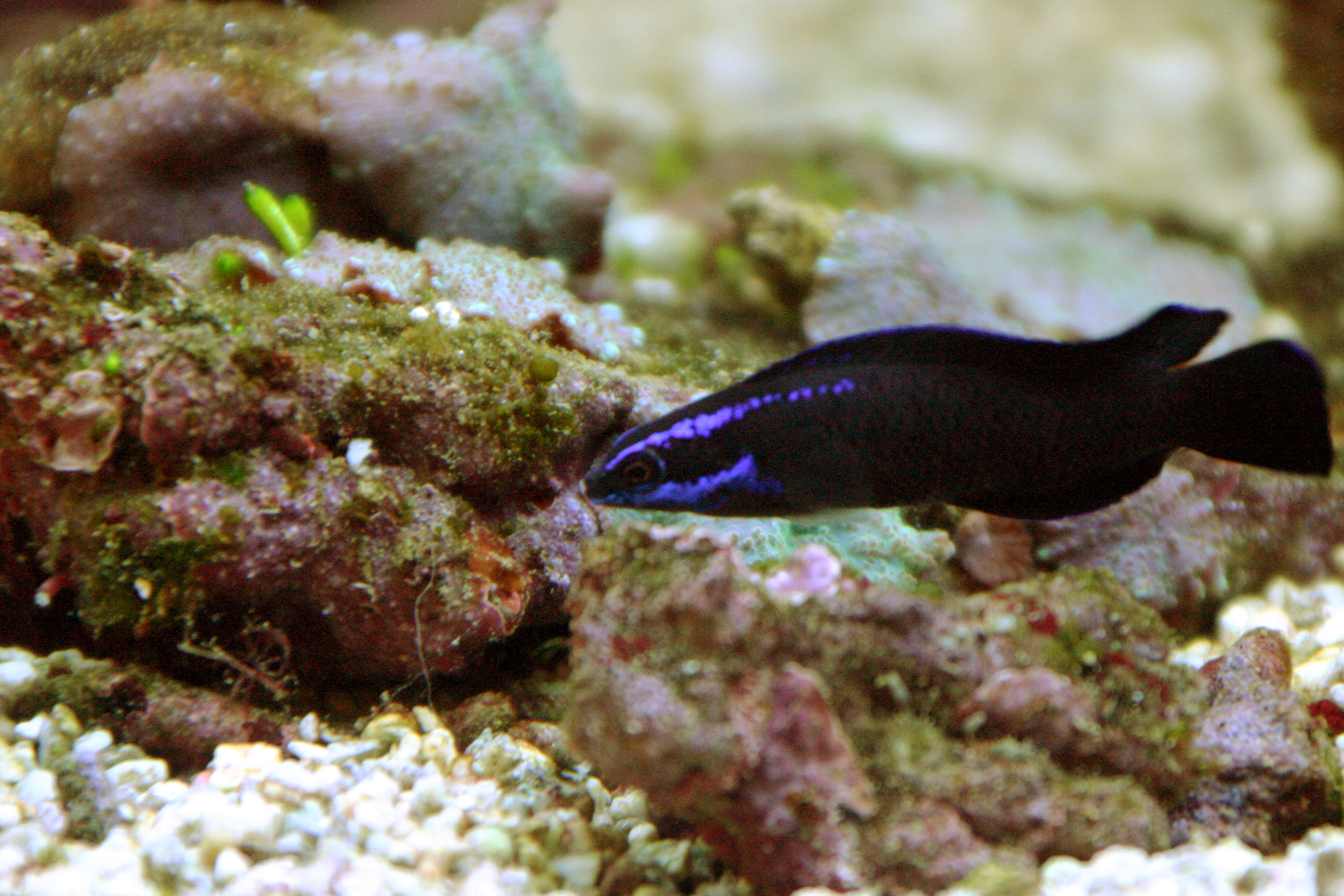
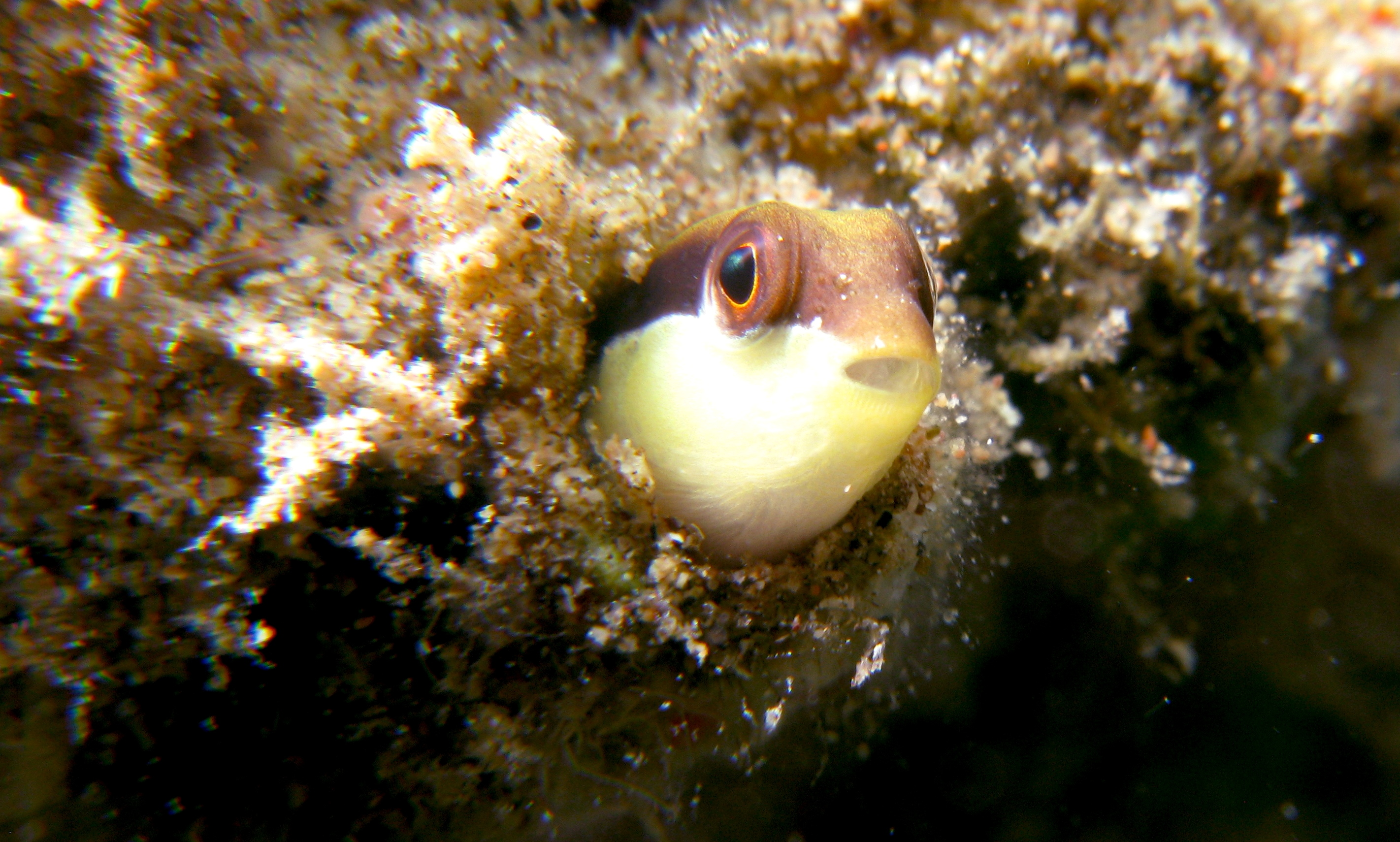
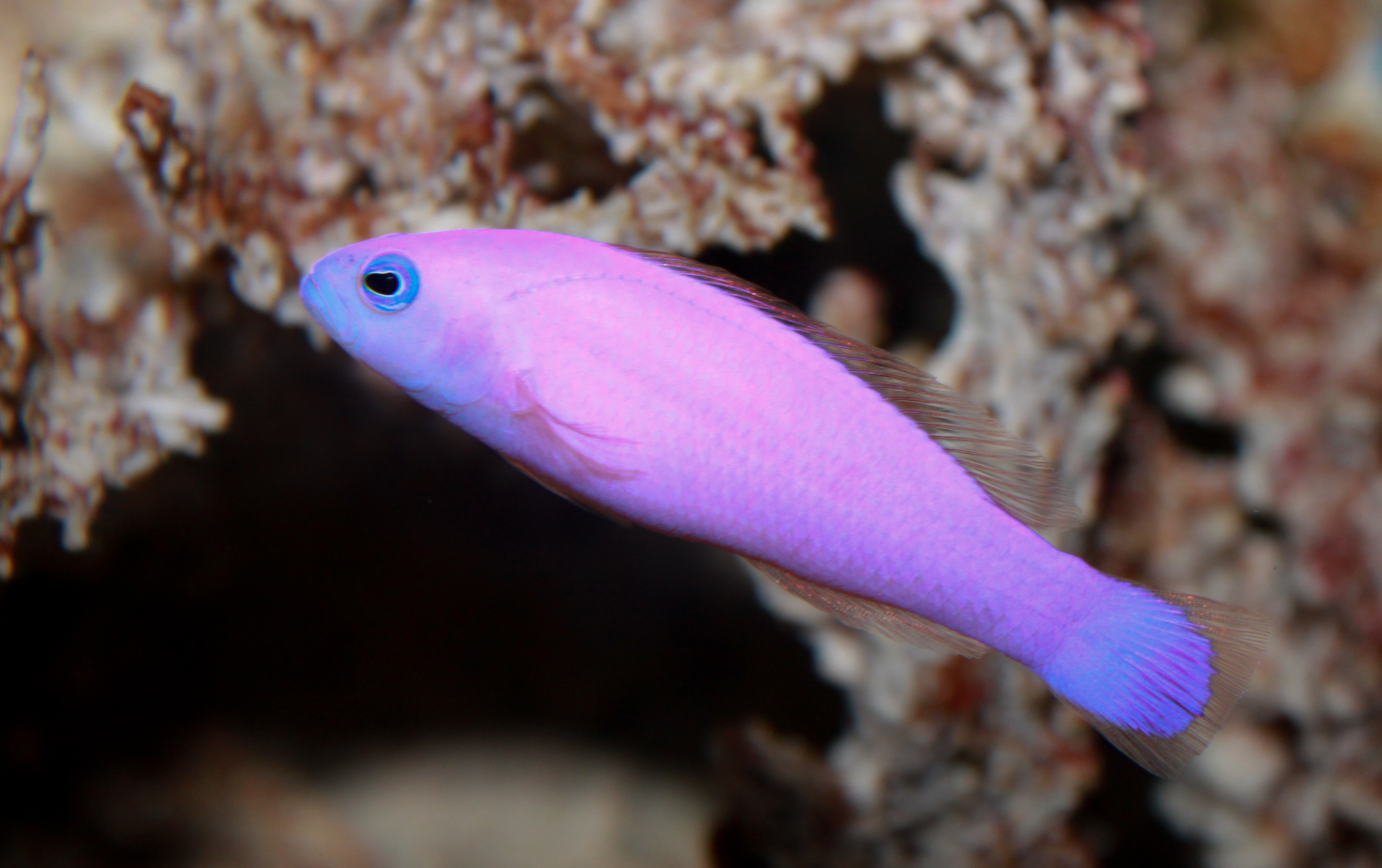
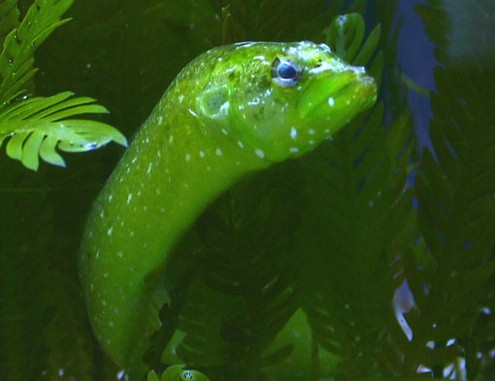
Common name	Image	Taxonomy	Reef safe	Description	Max size
Allen's dottyback		Manonichthys alleni	May eat shrimps		12 cm (4.7 in)
Australian multicolor pseudochromis		Ogilbyina novaehollandiae	May eat shrimps		10 cm (3.9 in)
Bicolor pseudochromis		Pseudochromis paccagnellae	May eat shrimps	Resembles royal gramma in coloration. The bicolor pseudochromis is semi-aggressive and will defend its territory against fish several times its size. This fish is fairly hardy, and is a good beginner fish.	6 cm (2.4 in)
Blue flavivertex pseudochromis		Pseudochromis flavivertex	May eat shrimps	Captive bred specimens are sometimes available	8 cm (3.1 in)
Bluelined dottyback		Pseudochromis cyanotaenia	May eat shrimps		6.1 cm (2.4 in)
Brown dottyback or yellow pseudochromis		Pseudochromis aureus	May eat shrimps		10 cm (3.9 in)
Cherry dottyback		Pholidochromis cerasina	May eat shrimps		7.9 cm (3.1 in)
Dilectus dottyback		Pseudochromis dilectus	May eat shrimps
Dusky dottyback		Pseudochromis fuscus	May eat shrimps		10 cm (3.9 in)
Elongate dottyback		Pseudochromis elongatus	May eat shrimps		6.4 cm (2.5 in)
Firetail dottyback		Pseudochromis flammicauda	May eat shrimps		5.6 cm (2.2 in)
Fridmani pseudochromis or orchid dottyback		Pseudochromis fridmani	May eat shrimps	Community fish does well in most aquariums. is not nearly as aggressive as other dottybacks.	8 cm (3.1 in)
Longfin dottyback		Manonichthys polynemus	May eat shrimps		12 cm (4.7 in)
Lyretail dottyback		Pseudochromis steenei	May eat shrimps		12 cm (4.7 in)
Neon pseudochromis, Arabian dottyback or neon dottyback		Pseudochromis aldabraensis	May eat shrimps	Captive bred specimens are sometimes available	10 cm (3.9 in)
Oblique-lined dottyback		Cypho purpurascens	May eat shrimps		7.4 cm (2.9 in)
Orangetail dottyback		Pseudochromis coccinicauda	May eat shrimps		5.8 cm (2.3 in)
Purple stripe pseudochromis or diadema basslet		Pseudochromis diadema	May eat shrimps		6 cm (2.4 in)
Red dottyback		Labracinus cyclophthalmus	With Caution	Large and aggressive for a dottyback	22 cm (8.7 in)
Sailfin pseudochromis		Pseudochromis veliferus	May eat shrimps		12 cm (4.7 in)
Splendid pseudochromis		Pseudochromis splendens	May eat shrimps		13 cm (5.1 in)
Springeri pseudochromis		Pseudochromis springeri	May eat shrimps	Captive bred species are sometimes available	5 cm (2.0 in)
Striped dottyback		Pseudochromis sankeyi	May eat shrimps	Captive bred specimens are sometimes available	8 cm (3.1 in)
Strawberry pseudochromis or purple pseudochromis		Pseudochromis porphyreus	May eat shrimps	A generally hardy fish, resembles the orchid dottyback, in that the body is a solid purple (sometimes pink), but is missing the black line/marking through the eye characteristic of orchids. This fish semi-aggressive in a home aquarium.	6 cm (2.4 in)
Twolined dottyback		Pseudochromis bitaeniatus	May eat shrimps		6.9 cm (2.7 in)
Carpet eel-blenny		Congrogadus subducens	with caution	Despite being eel-like in appearance, Carpet eel-blennies are part of the family pseudochromidae.	45 cm (17.7 in)

== Rabbitfish and Foxfaces ==
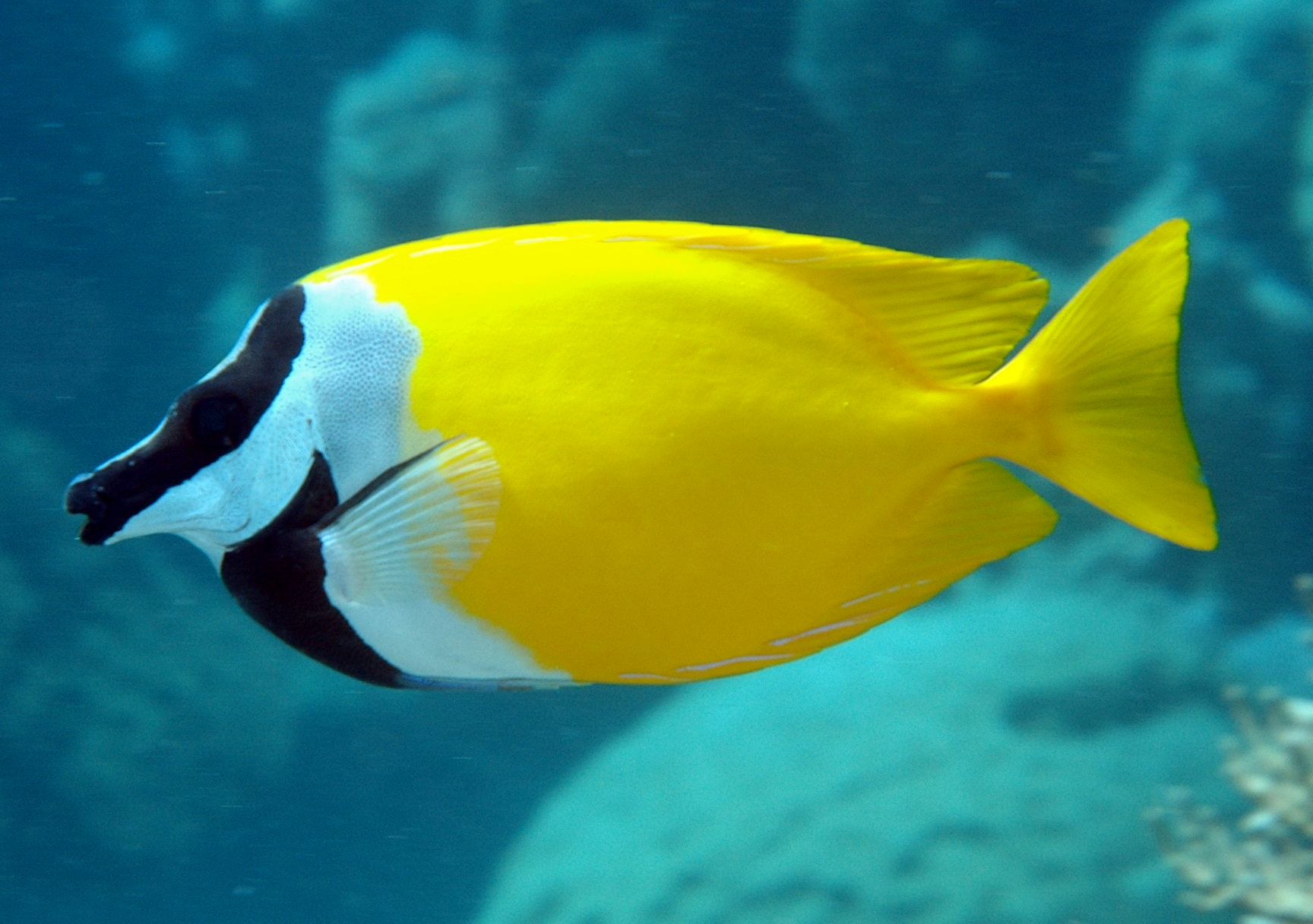
Foxface

Less commonly kept than some other species, many still make hardy and colorful aquarium residents.

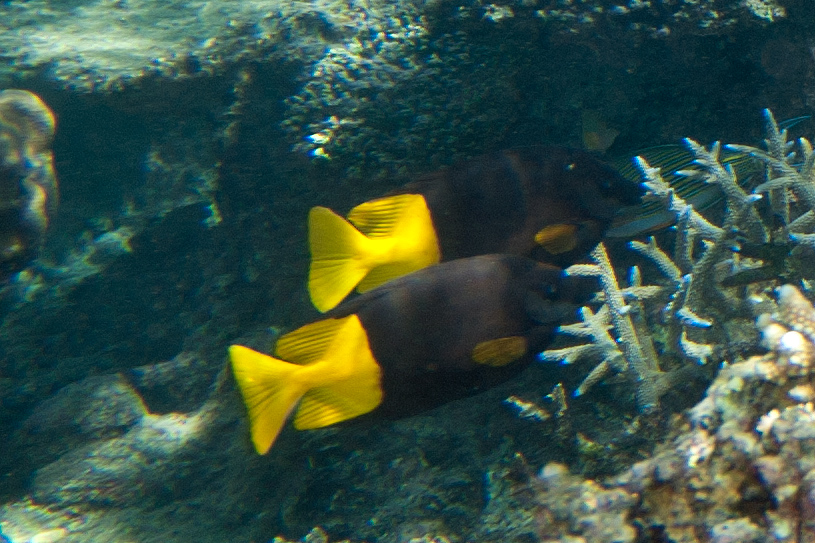
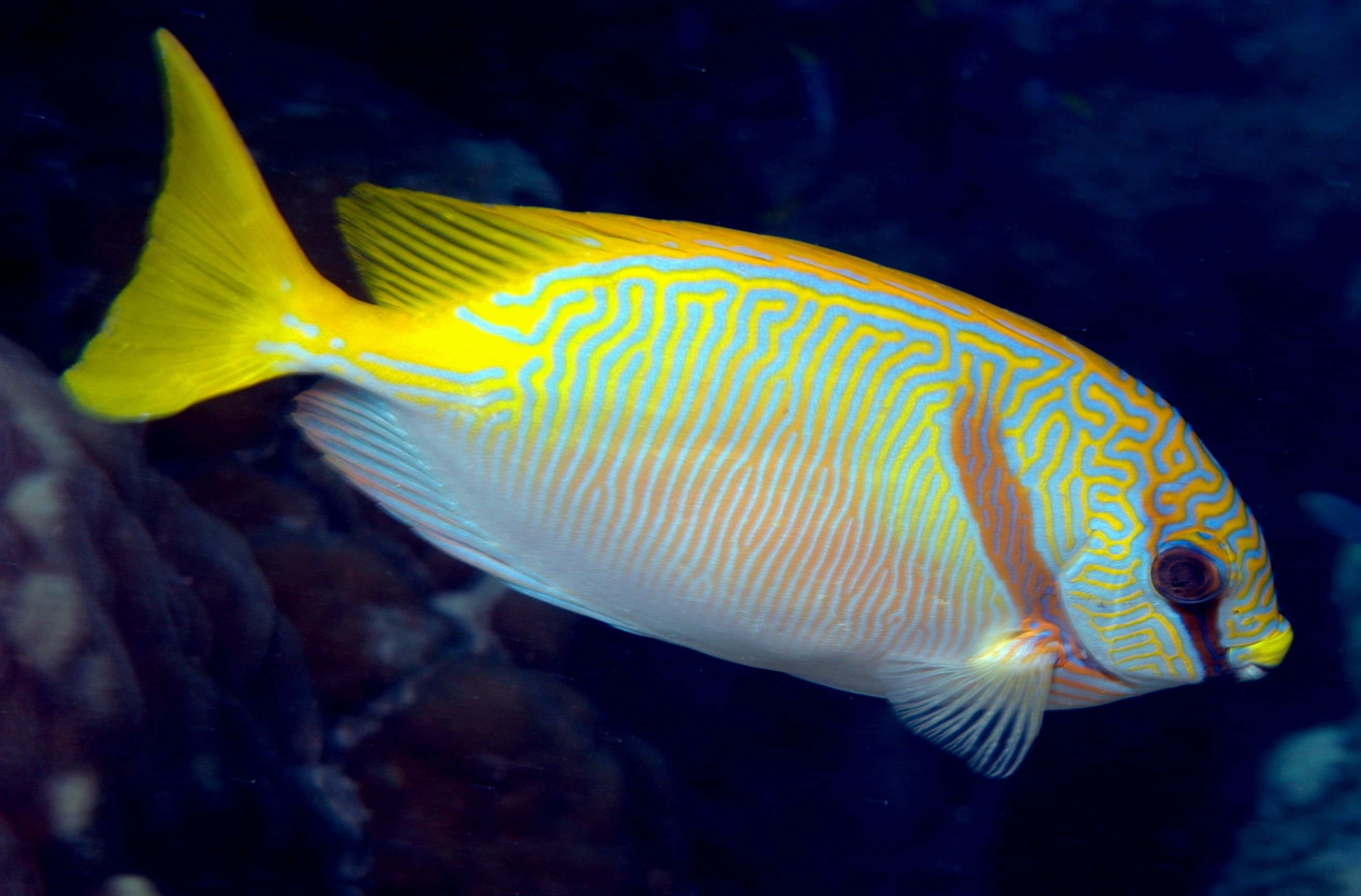
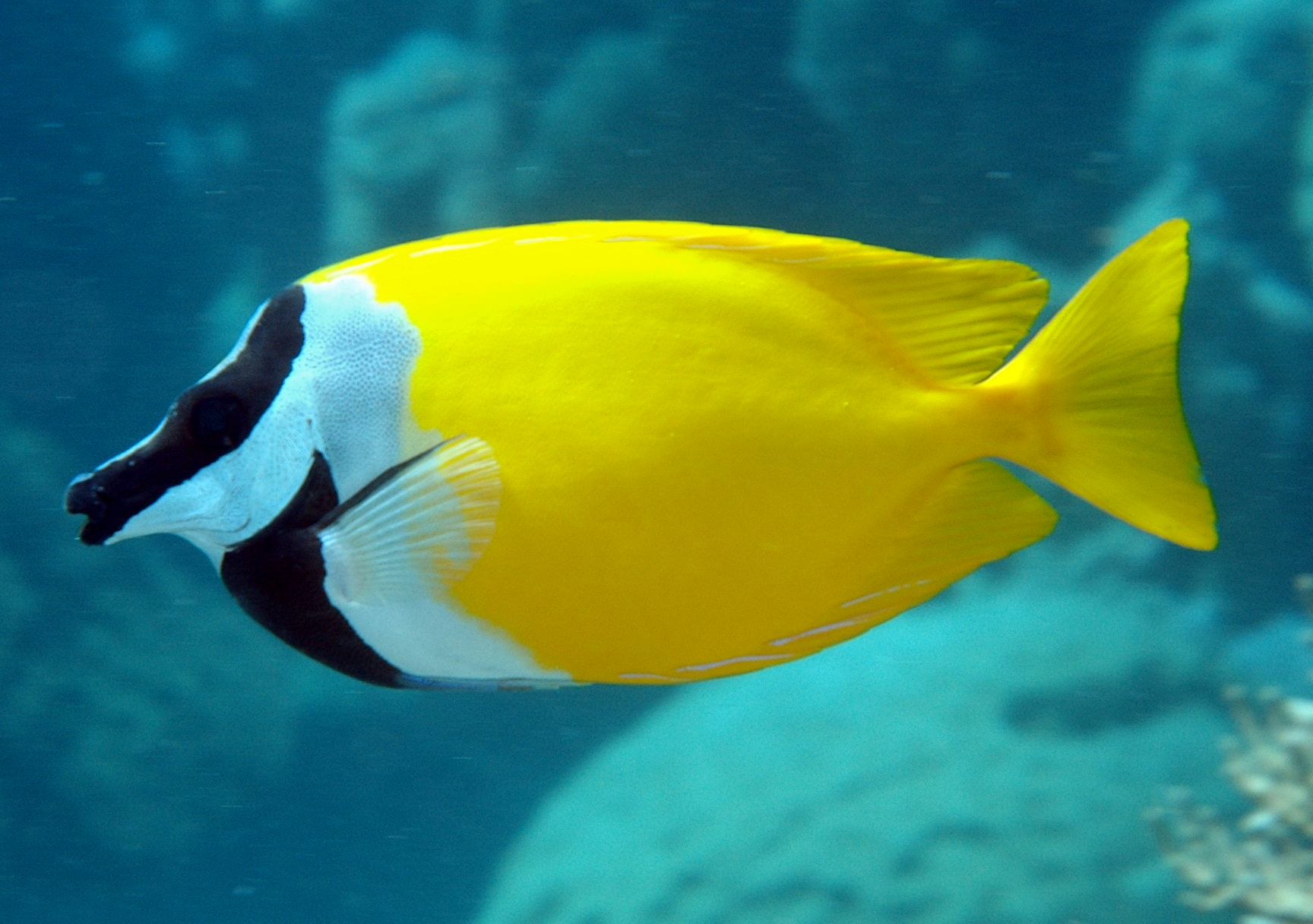
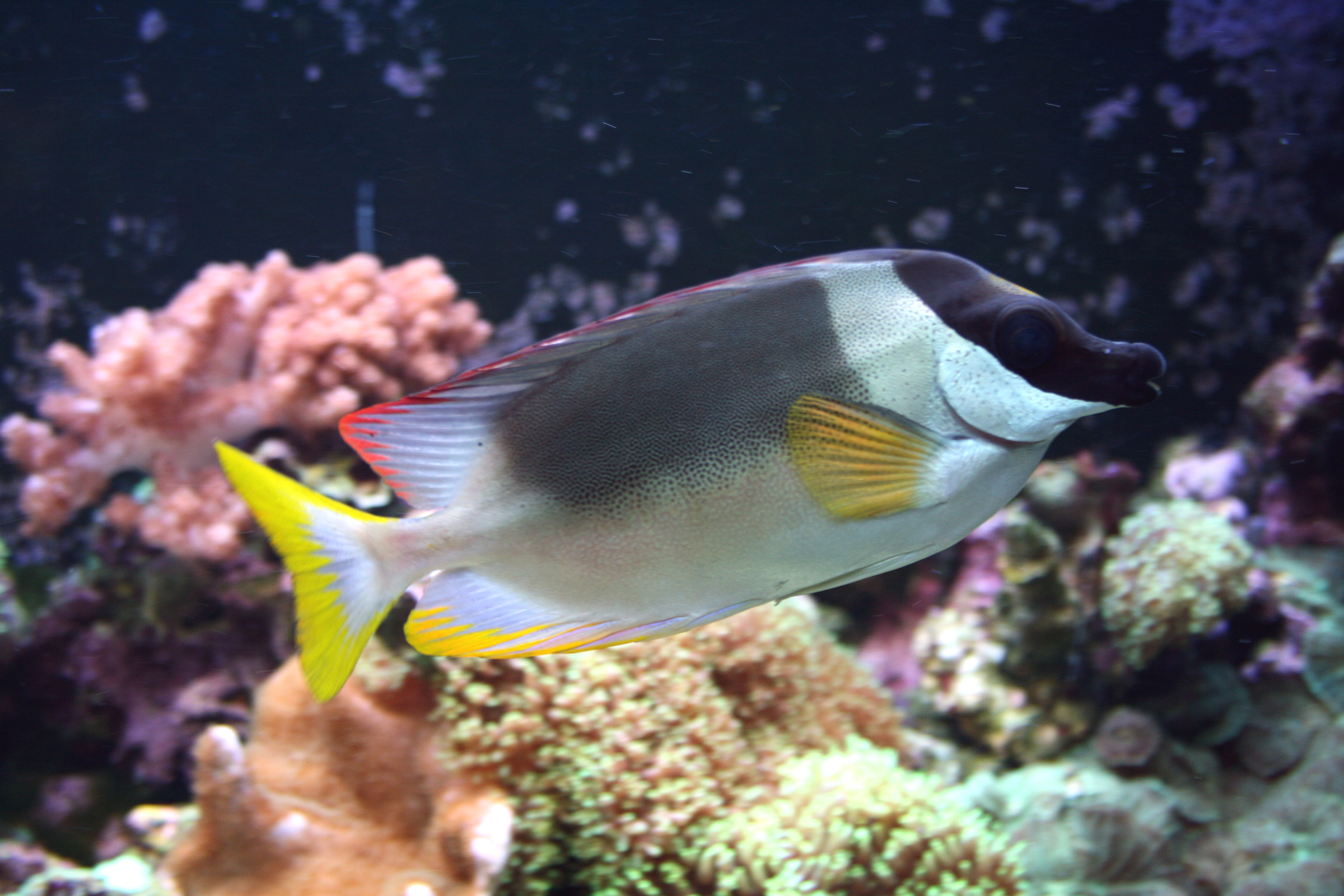
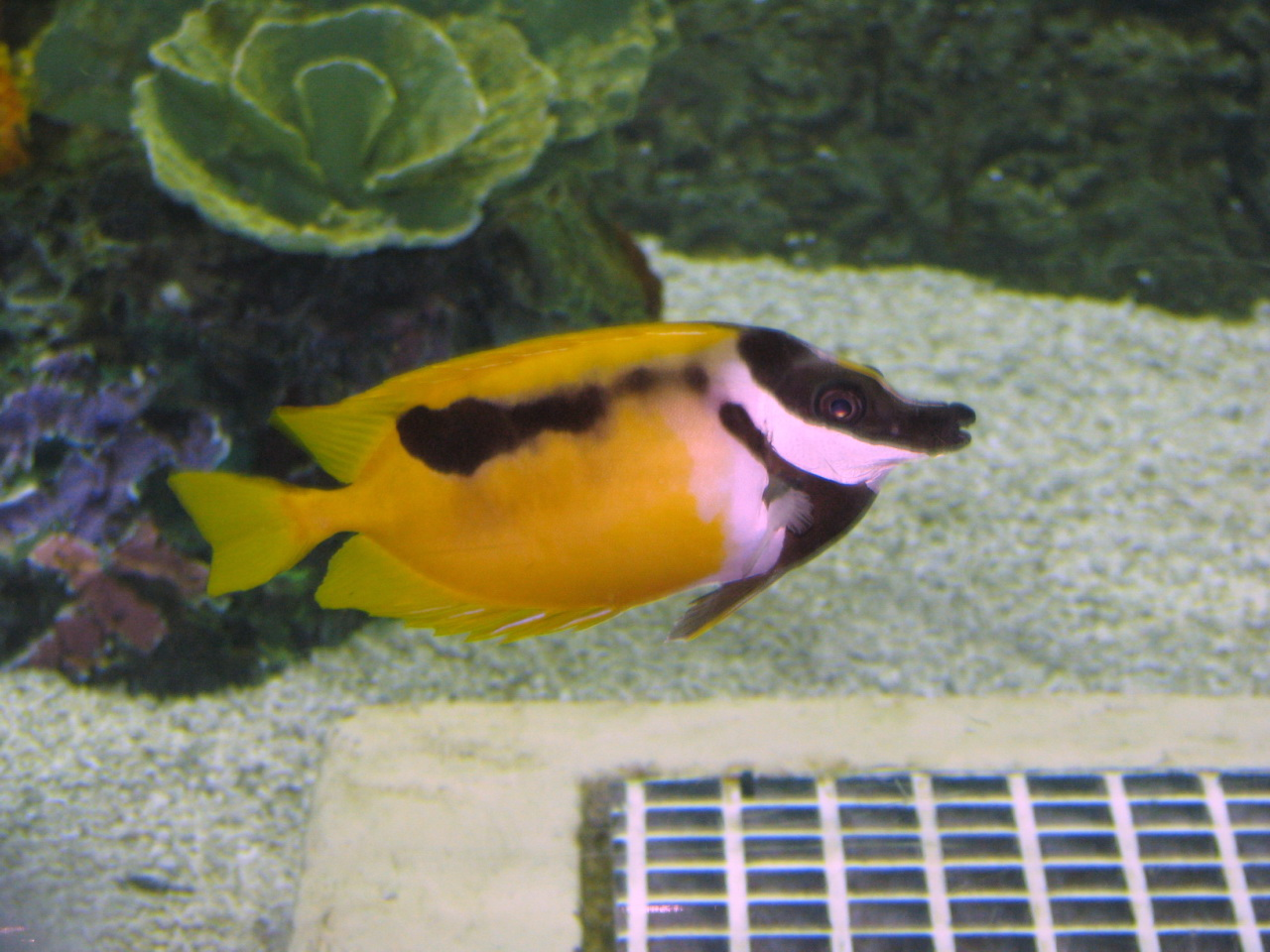
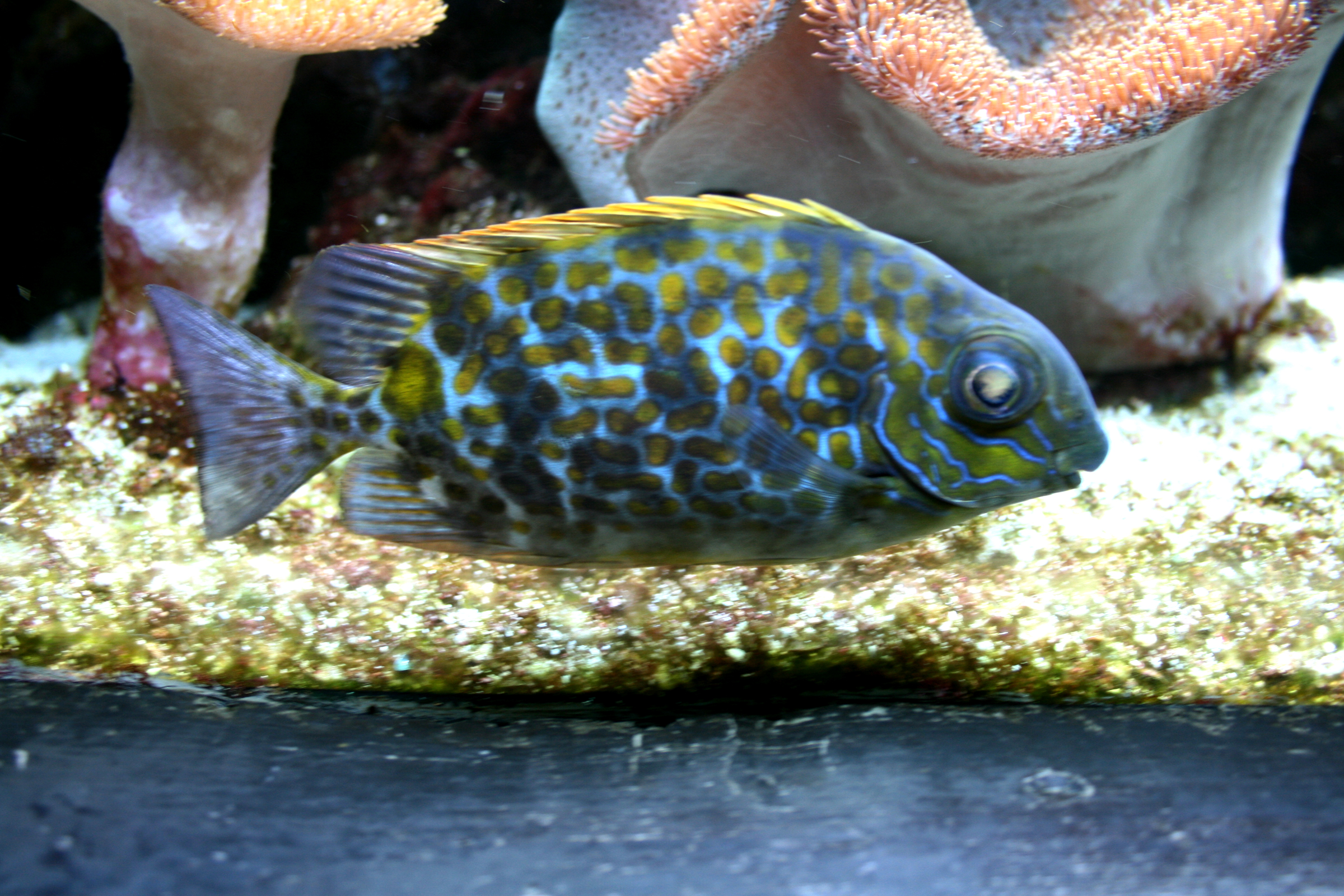
Common name	Image	Taxonomy	Reef safe	Description	Max size
Bicolor Foxface		Siganus uspi	With Caution		24 cm (9.4 in)
Blue-Lined Rabbitfish		Siganus doliatus	With Caution		25 cm (9.8 in)
Foxface		Siganus vulpinus		they have venomous spines	23 cm (9.1 in)
Magnificent foxface		Siganus magnificus			24 cm (9.4 in)
One Spot Foxface		Siganus unimaculatus	With Caution		18 cm (7.1 in)
Yellow Blotch Rabbitfish		Siganus guttatus	With Caution		42 cm (16.5 in)

== Rays ==
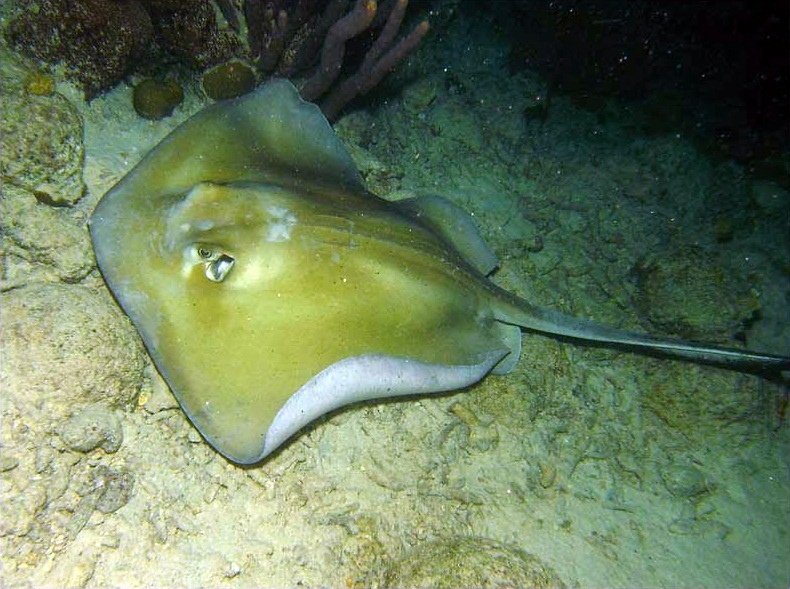
Southern stingray

Most rays have a venomous spine near the base of the tail. Care must be taken to avoid this animal when performing tank maintenance and during capture.

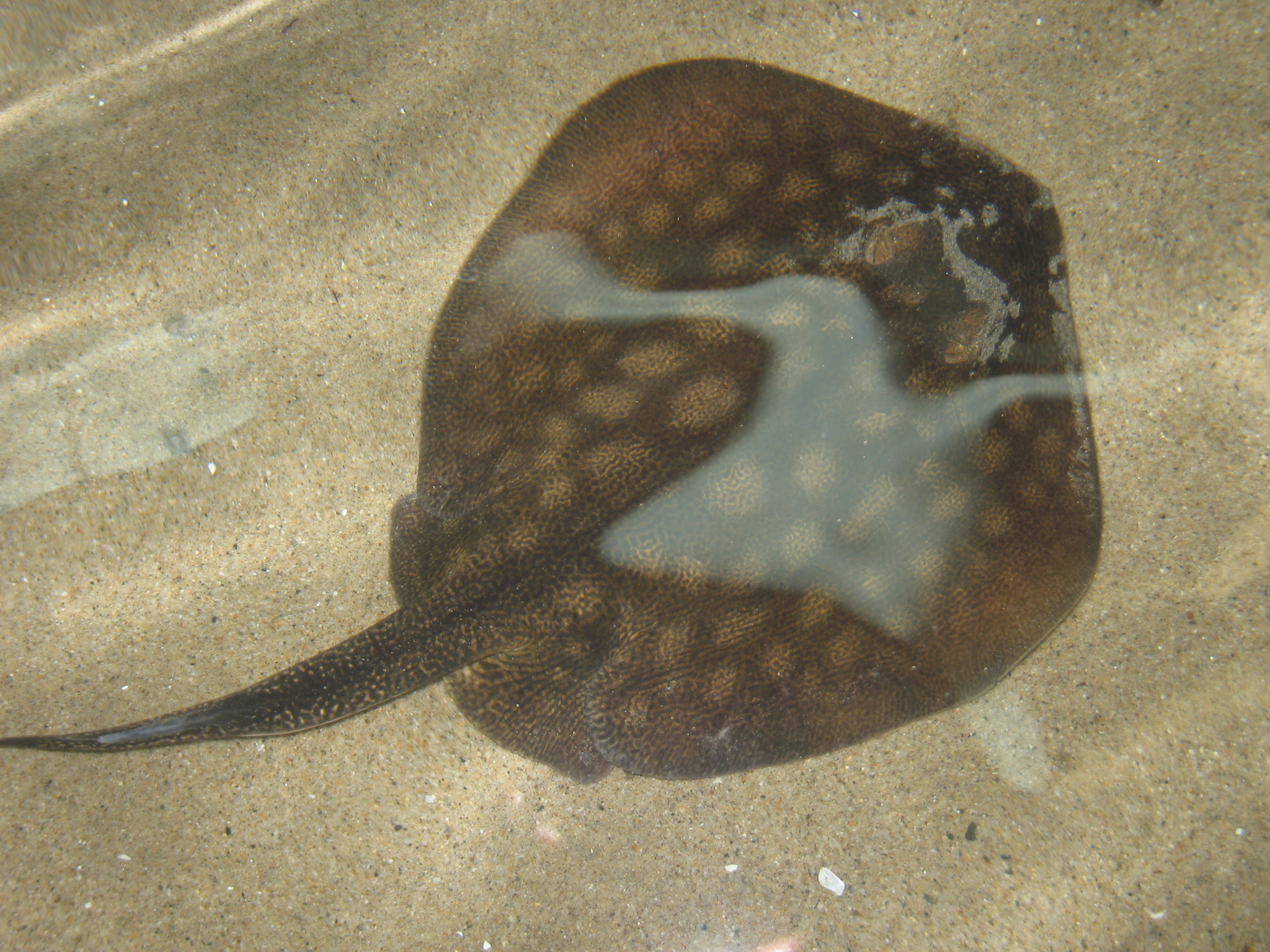
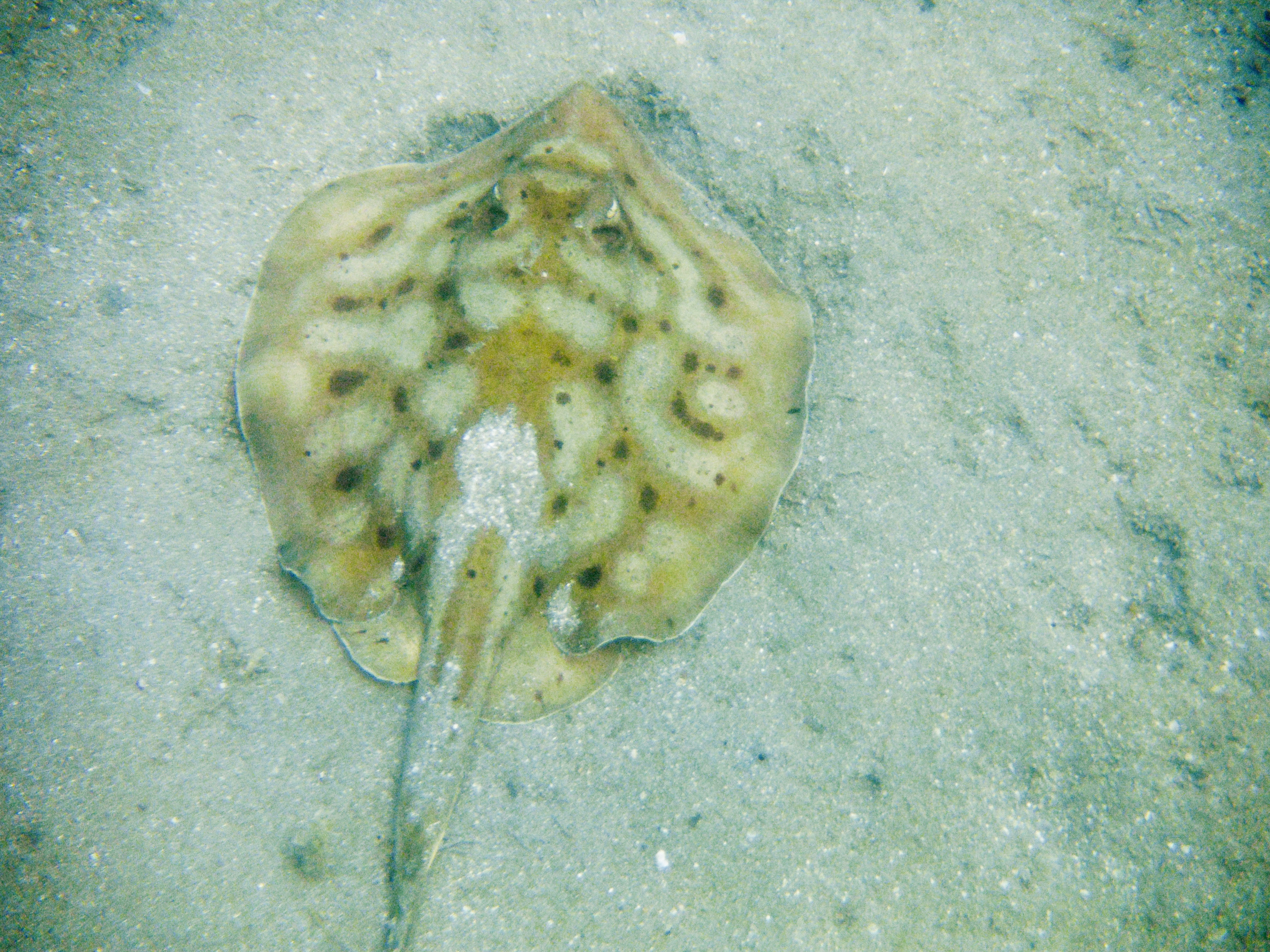
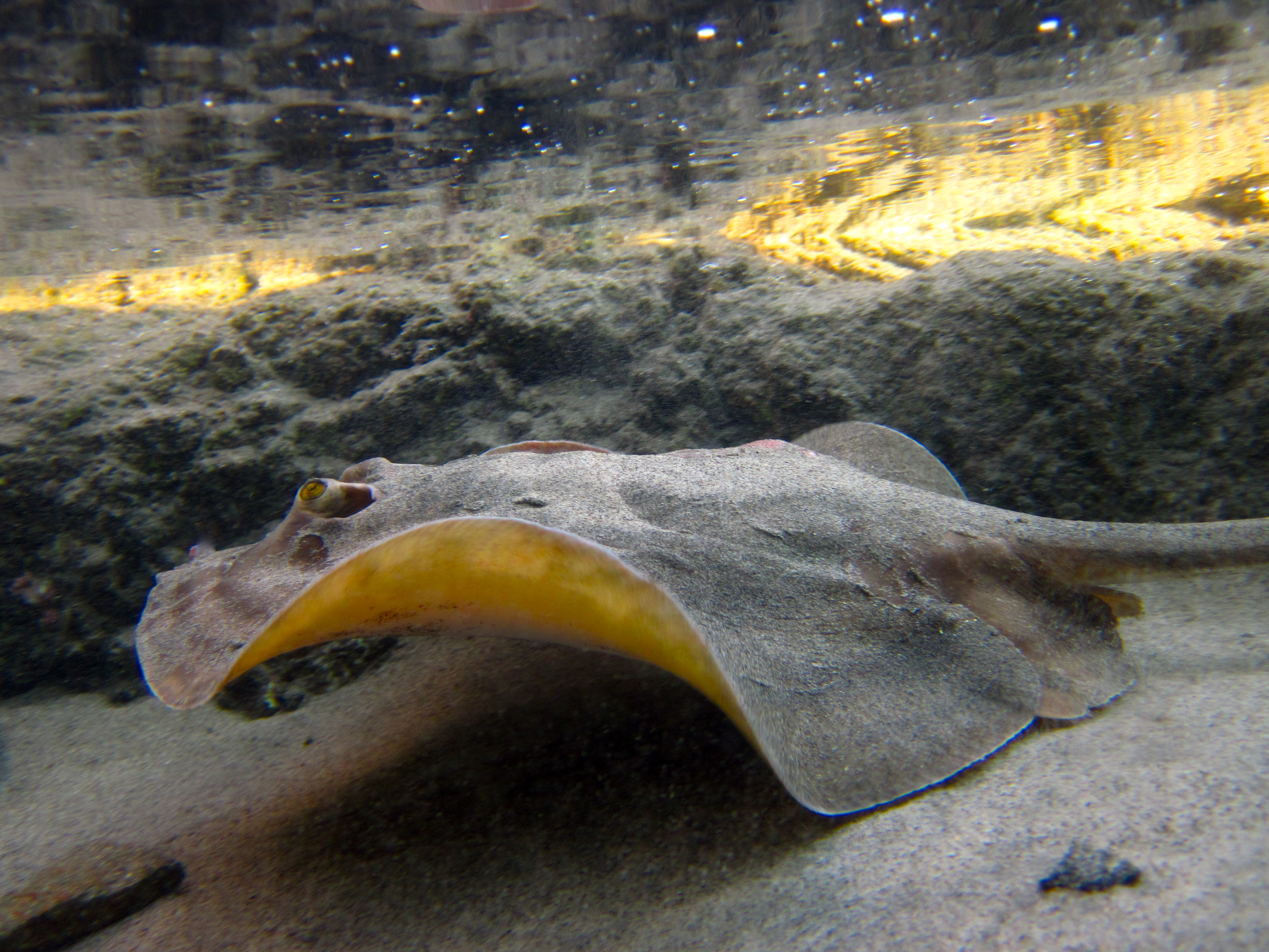
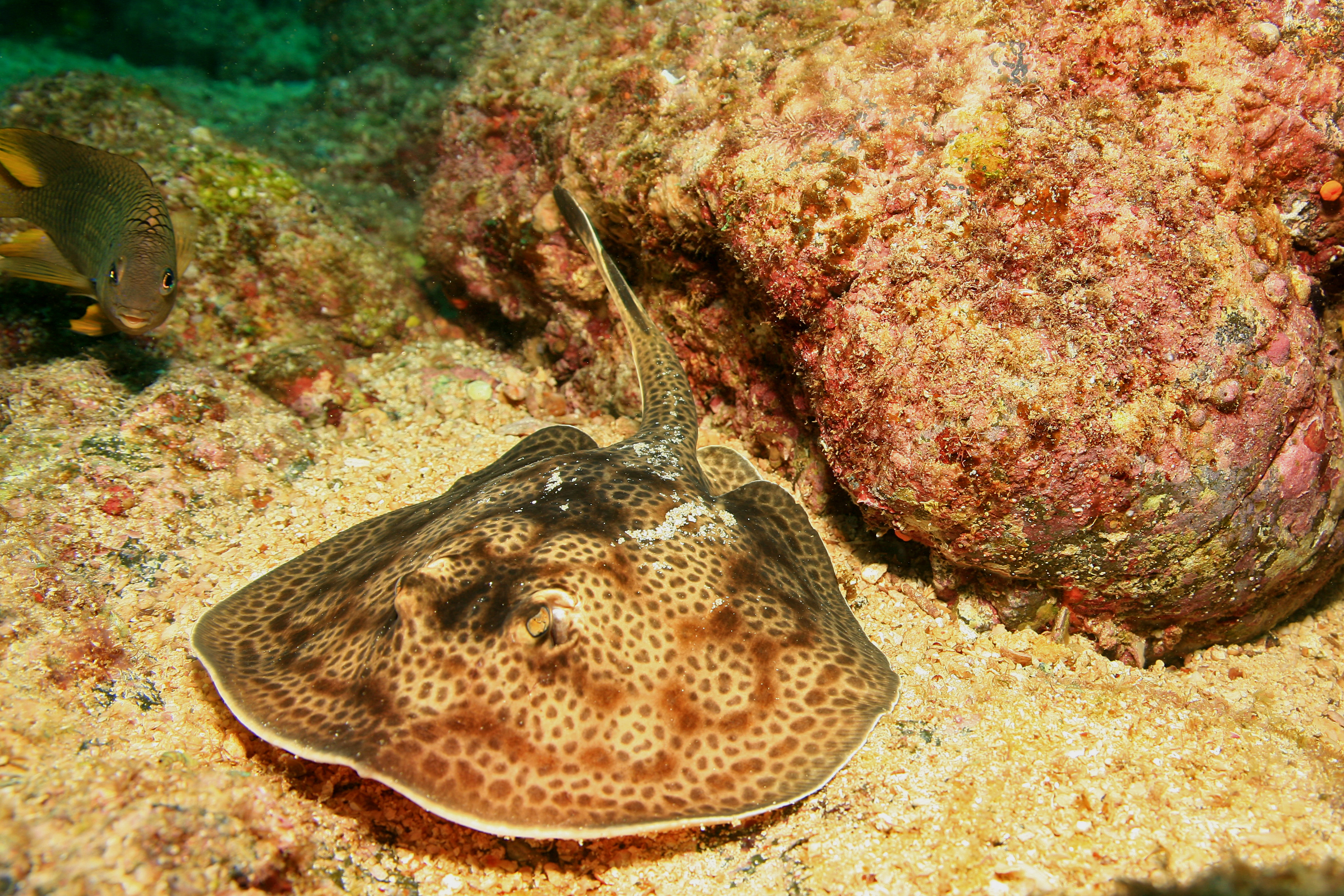
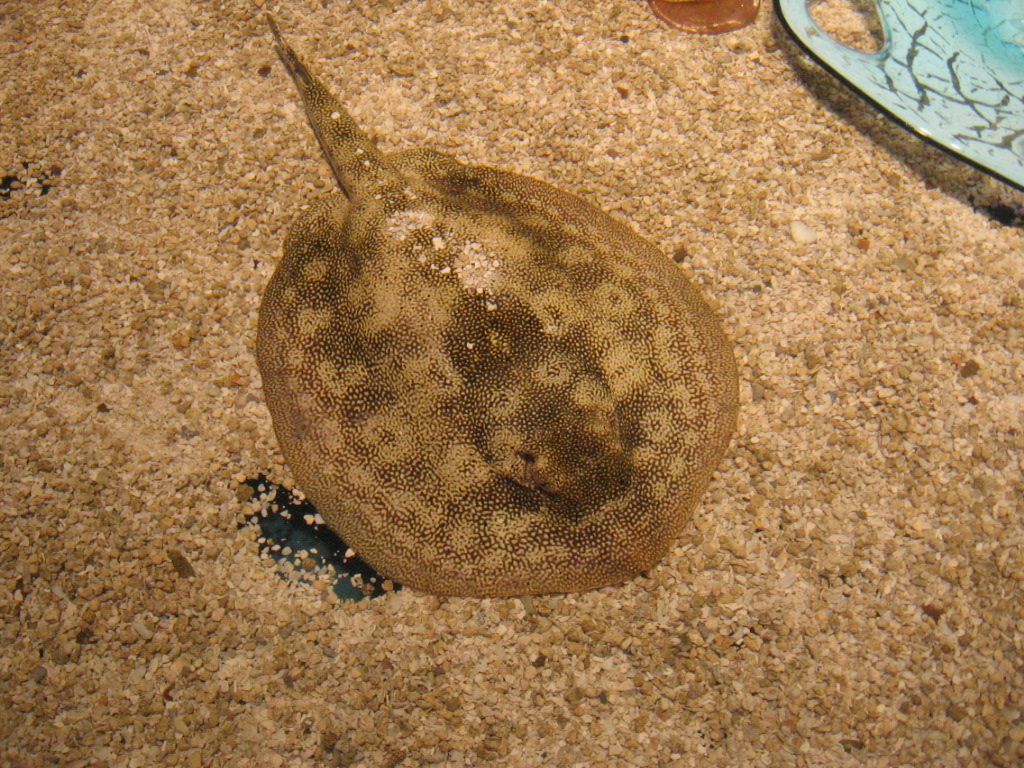
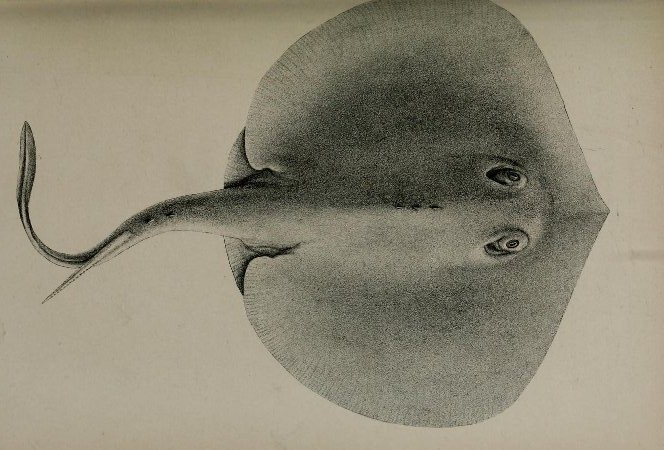
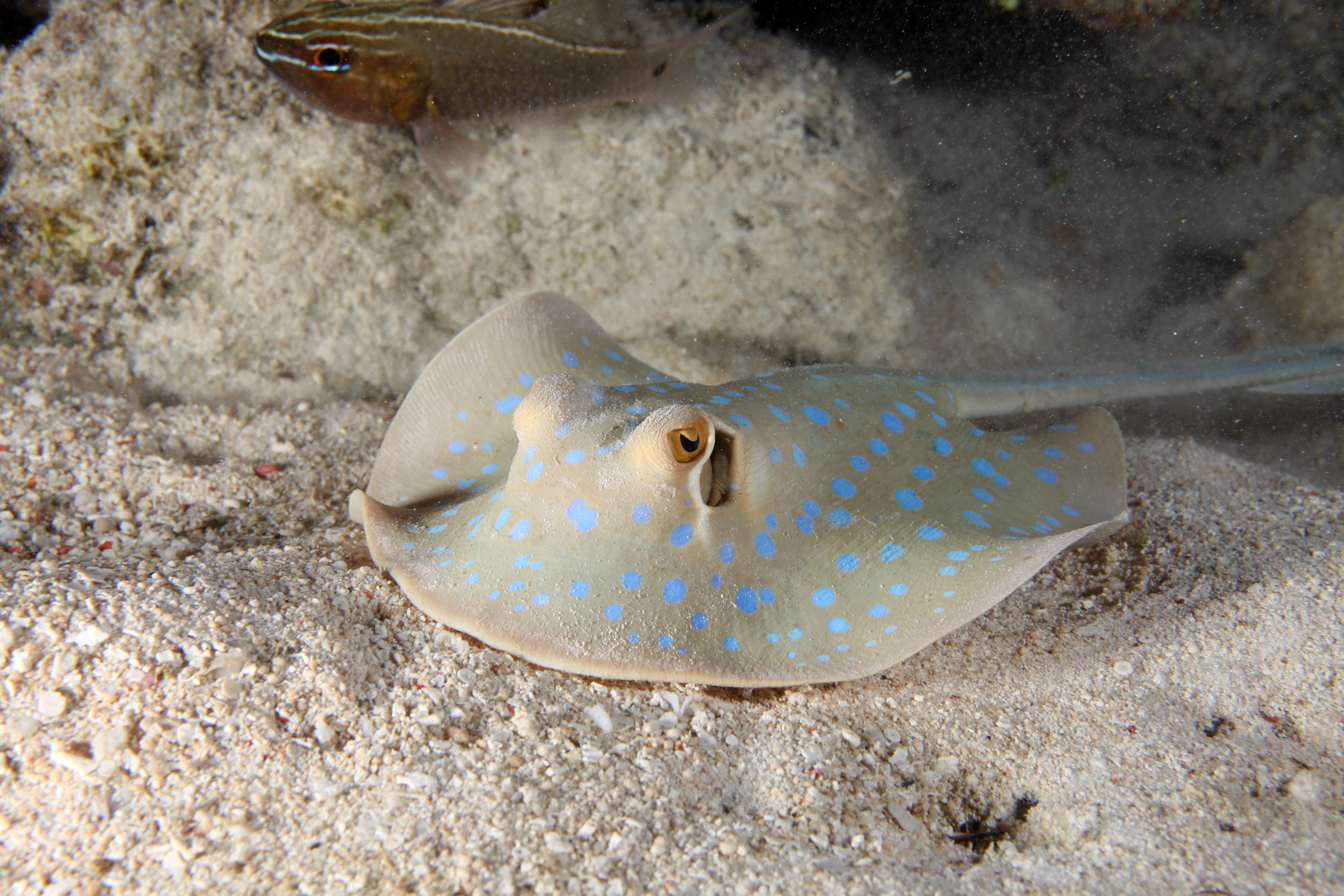
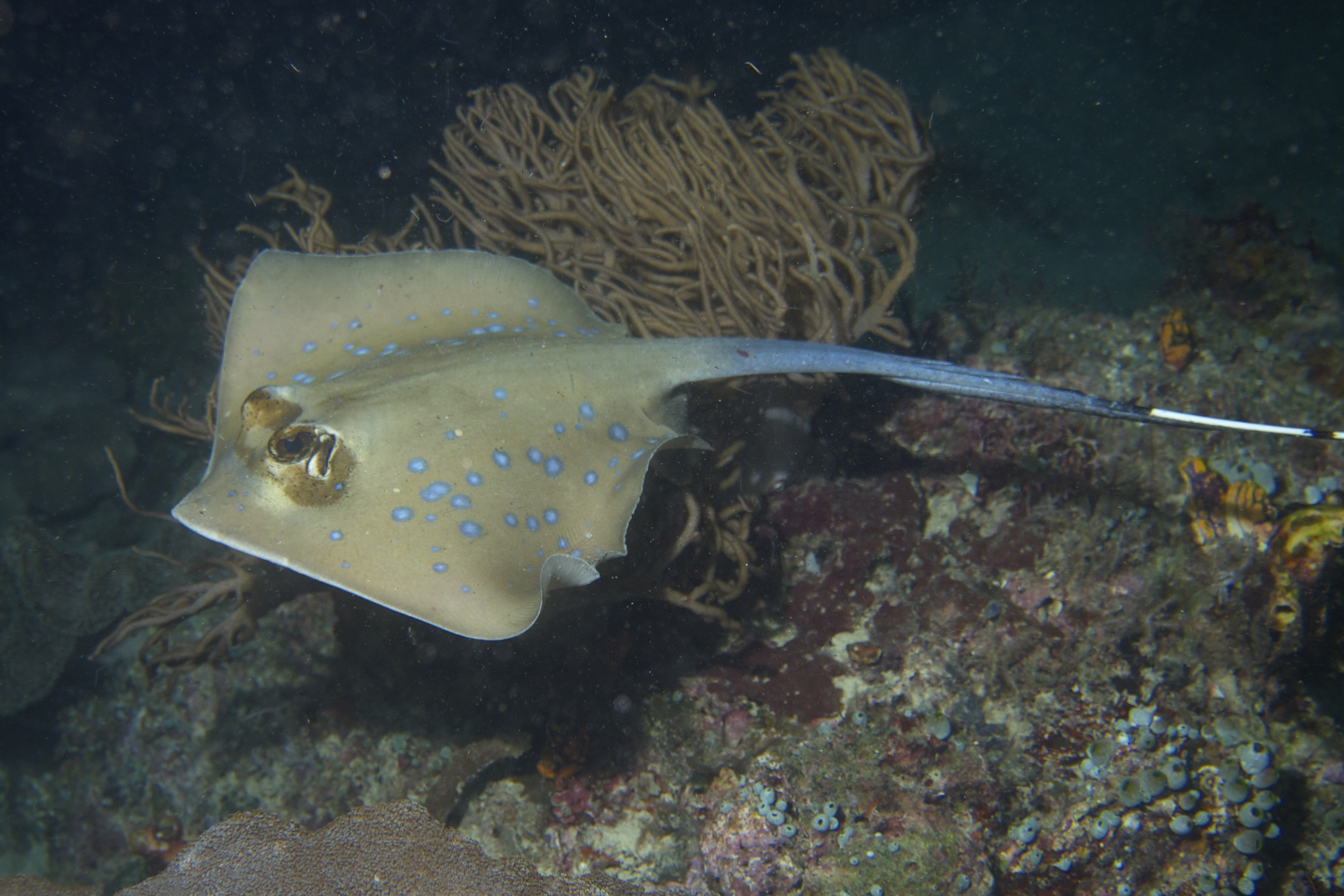
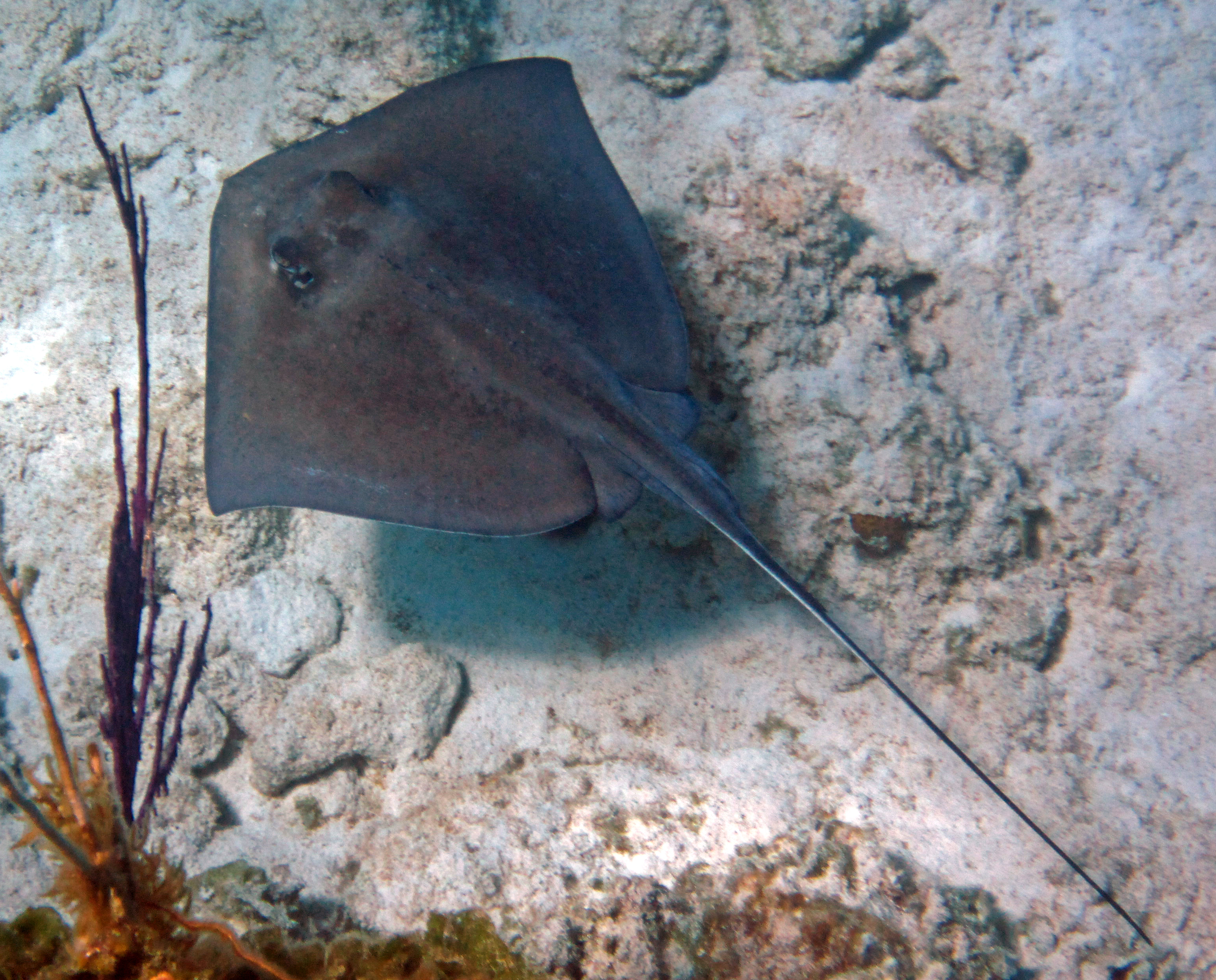
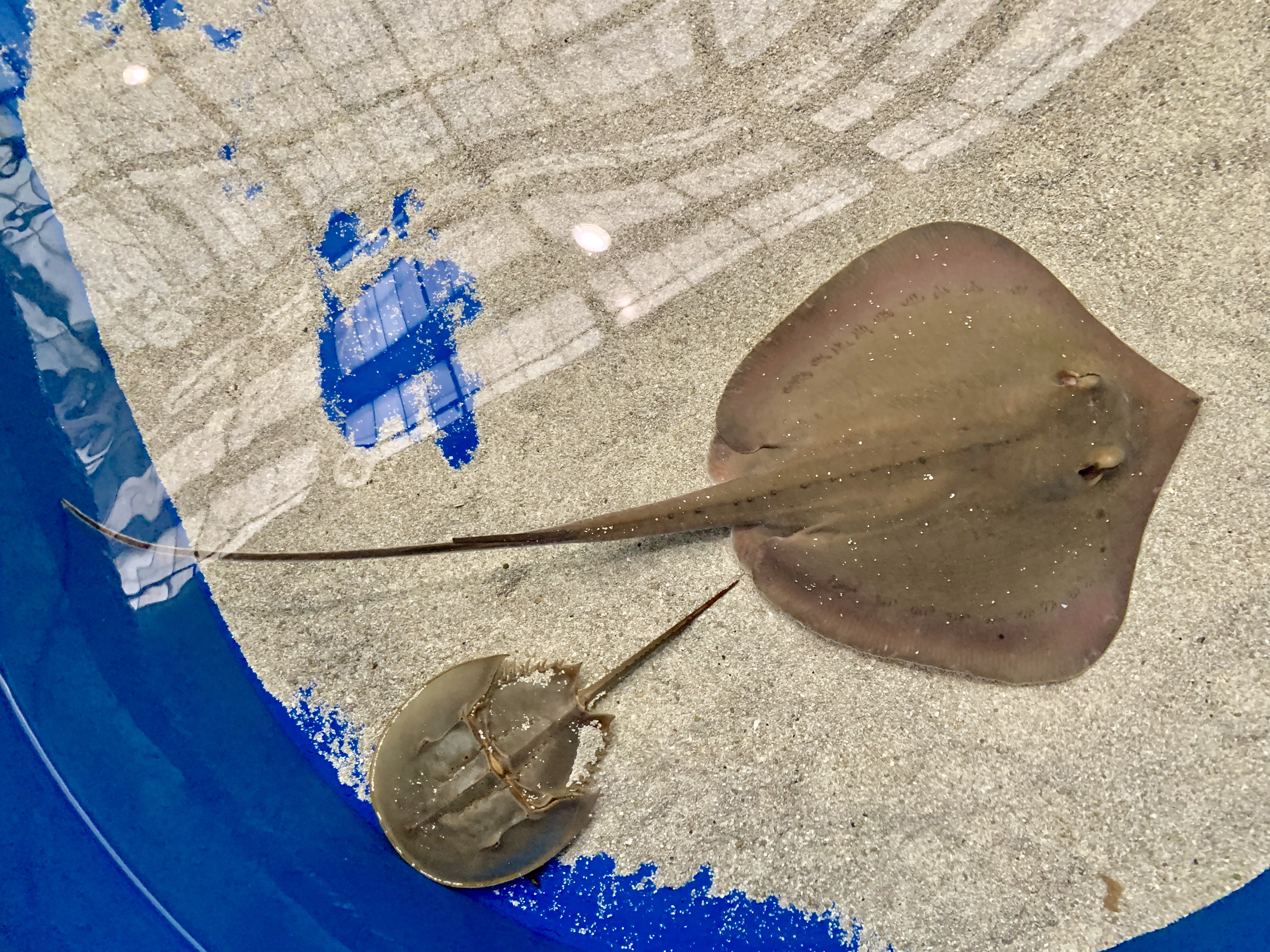
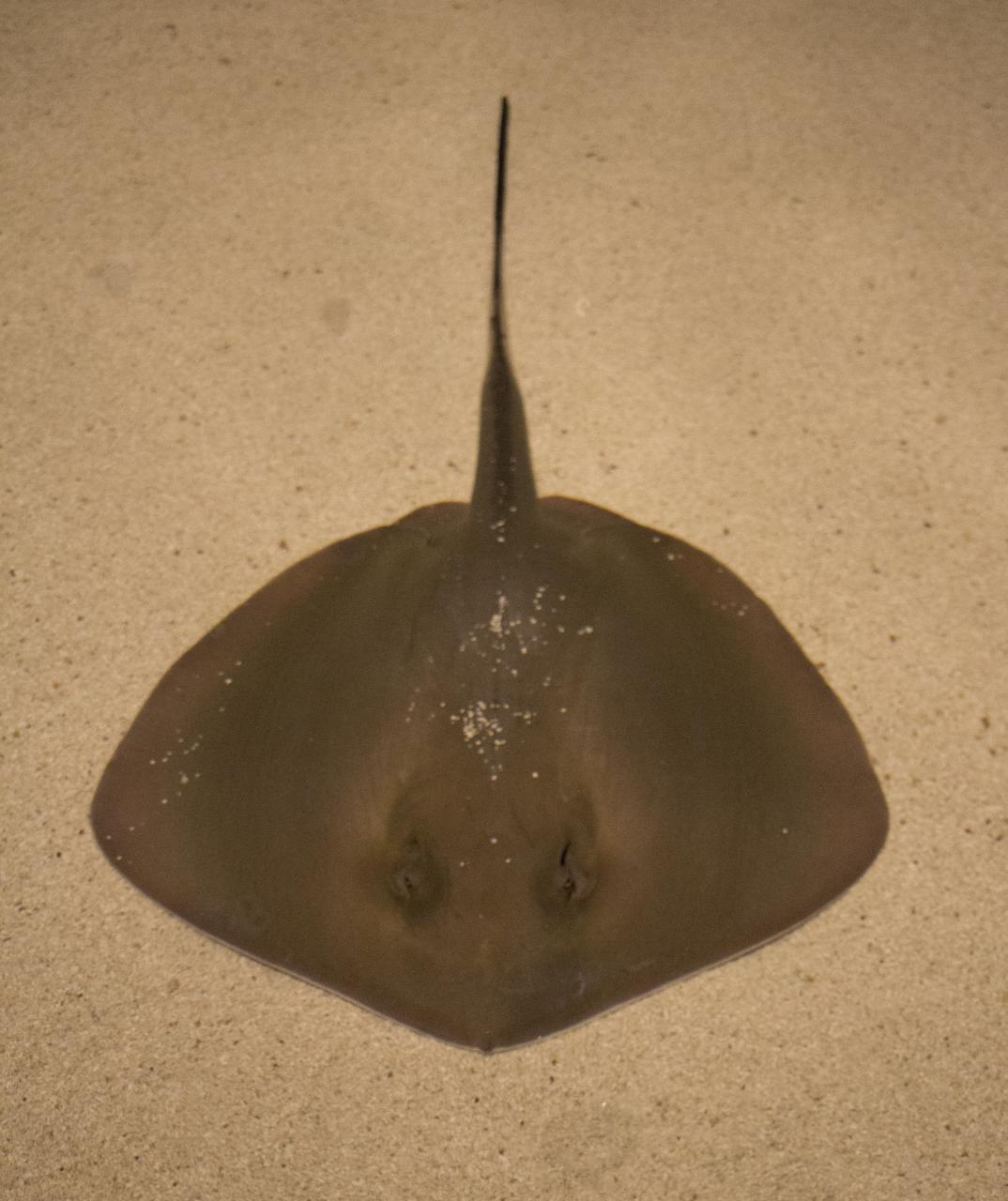
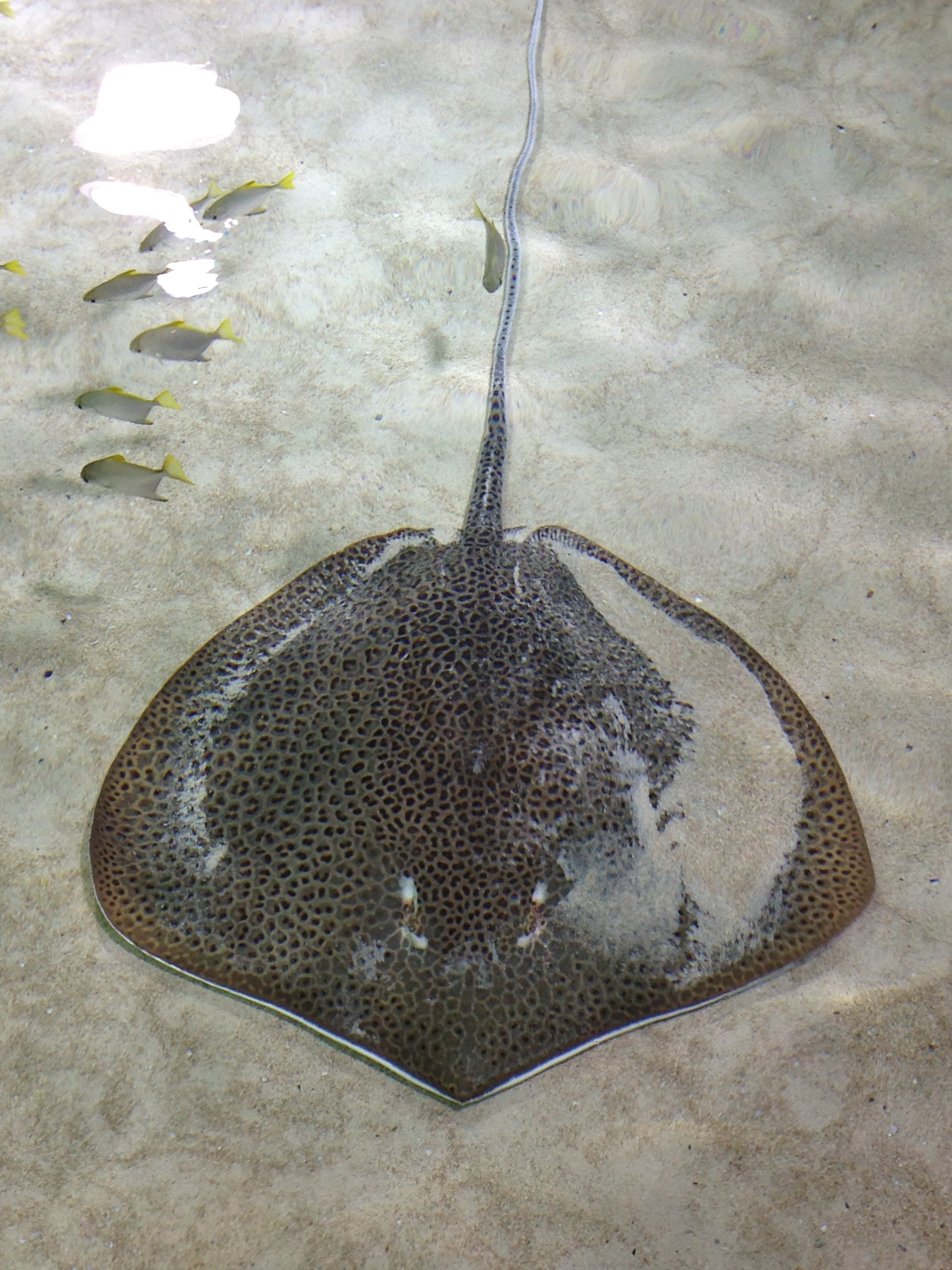
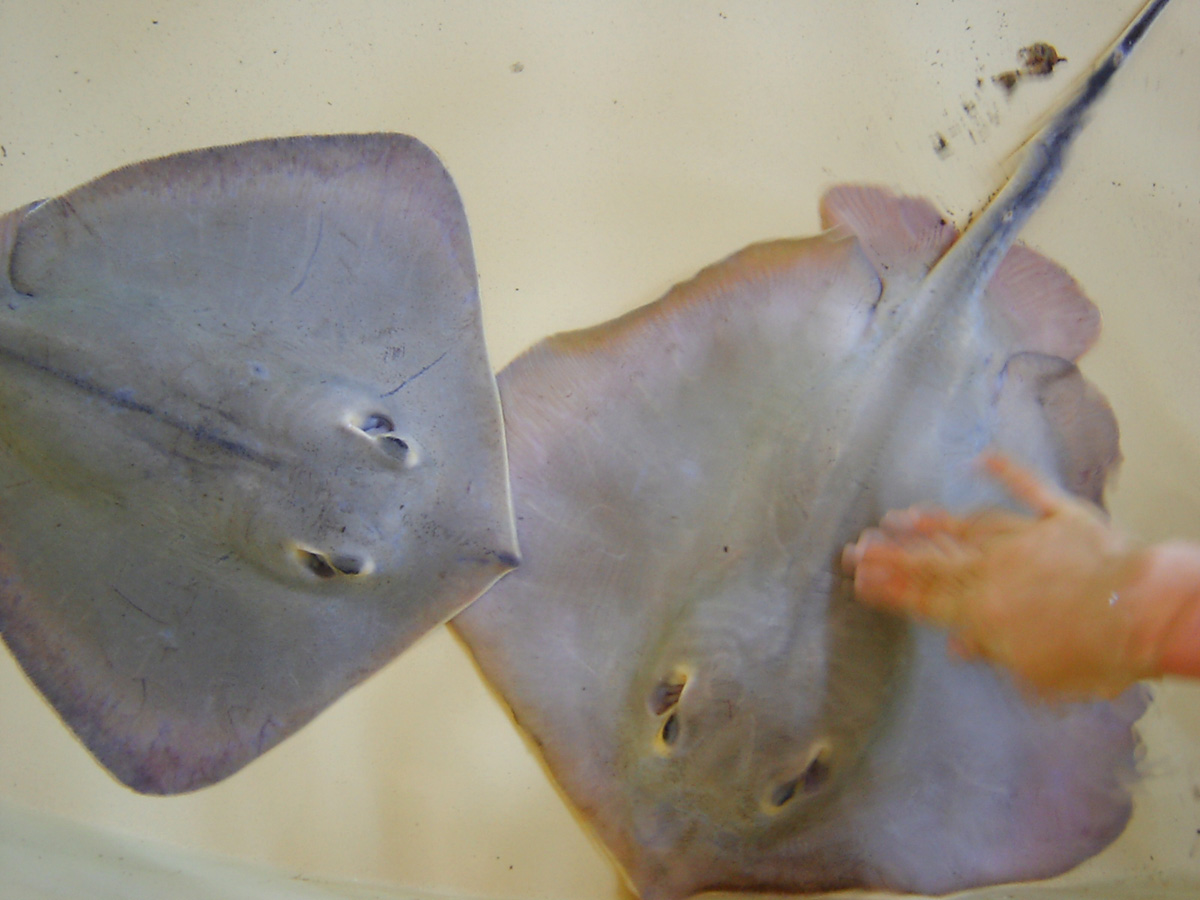
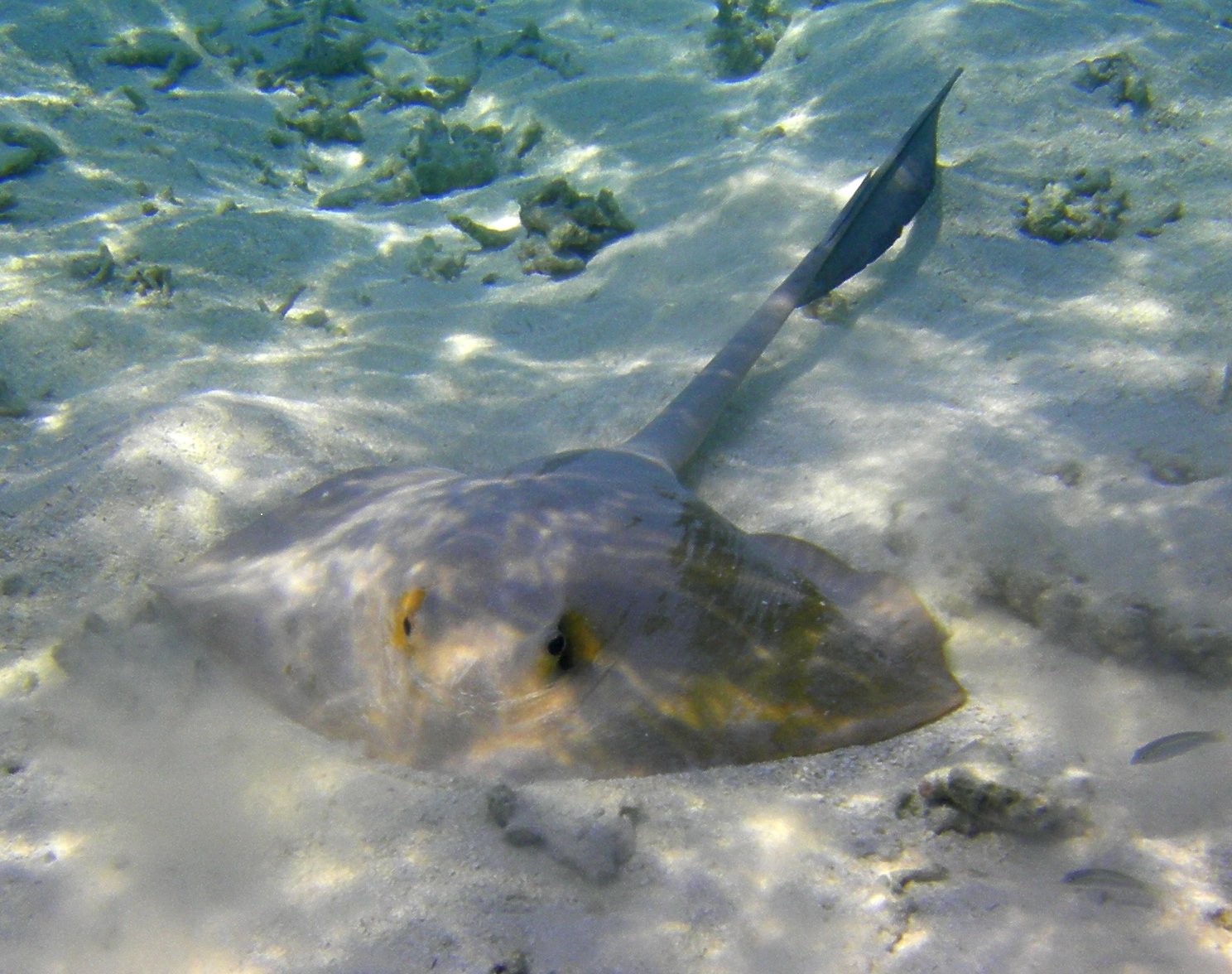
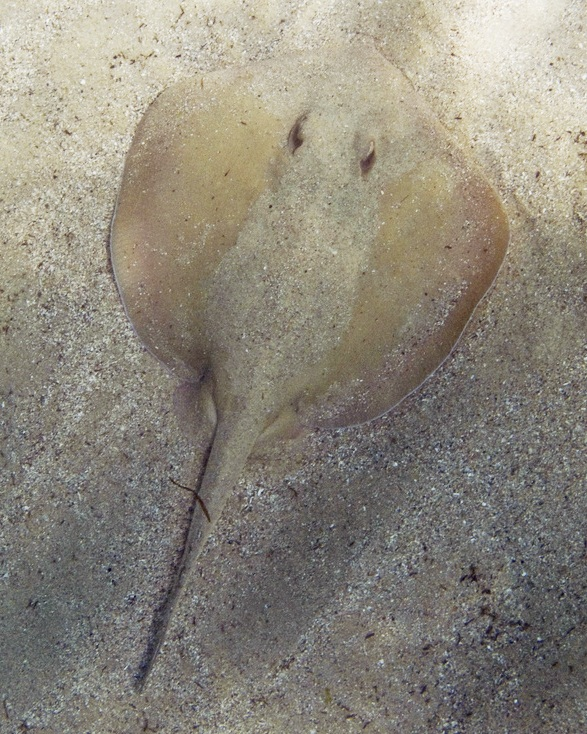
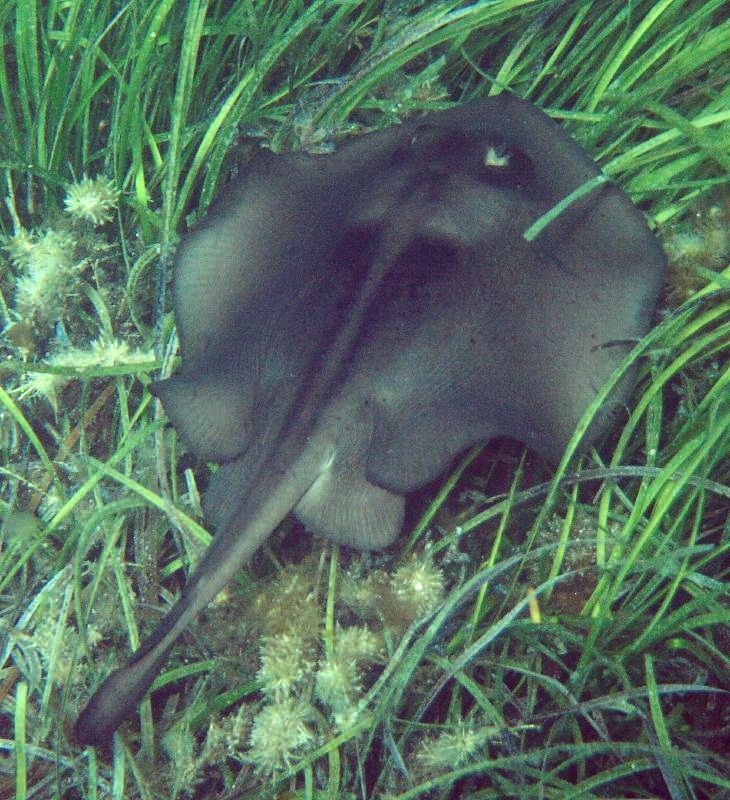
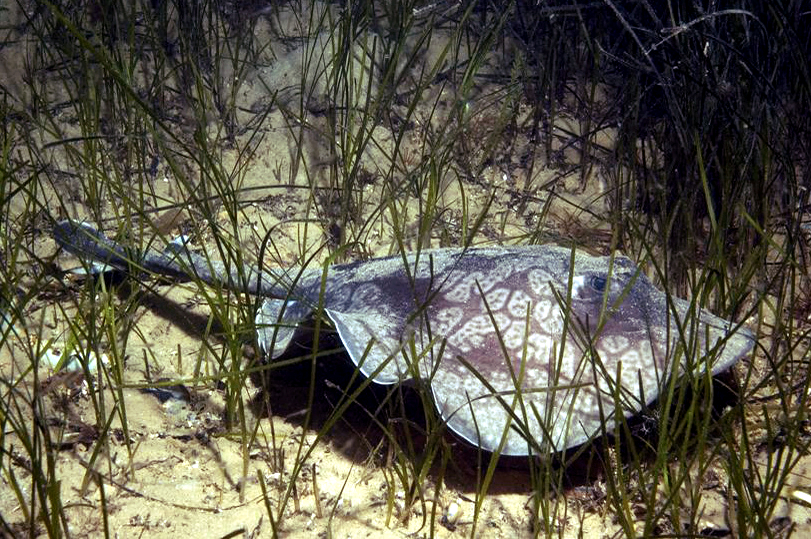
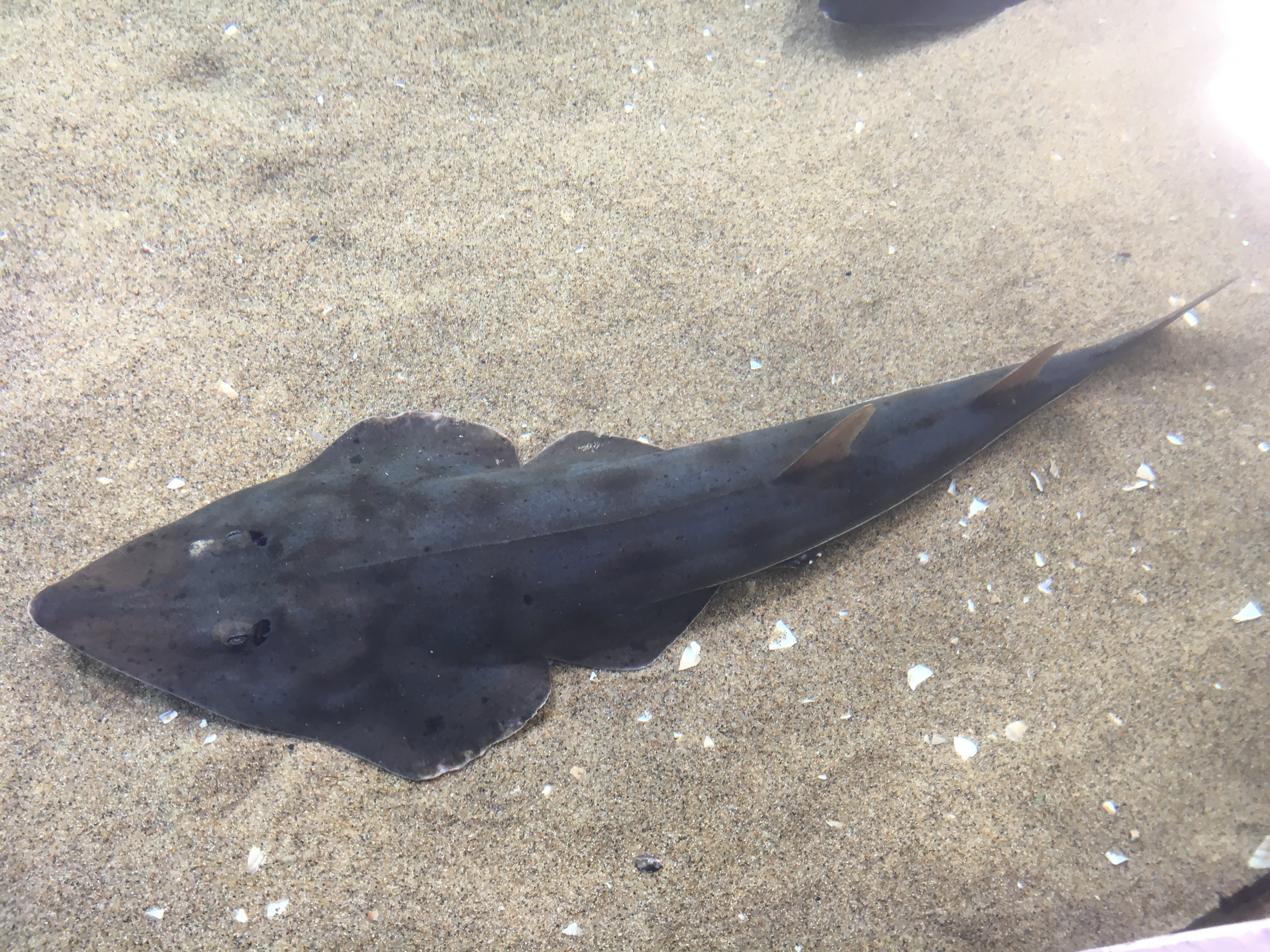
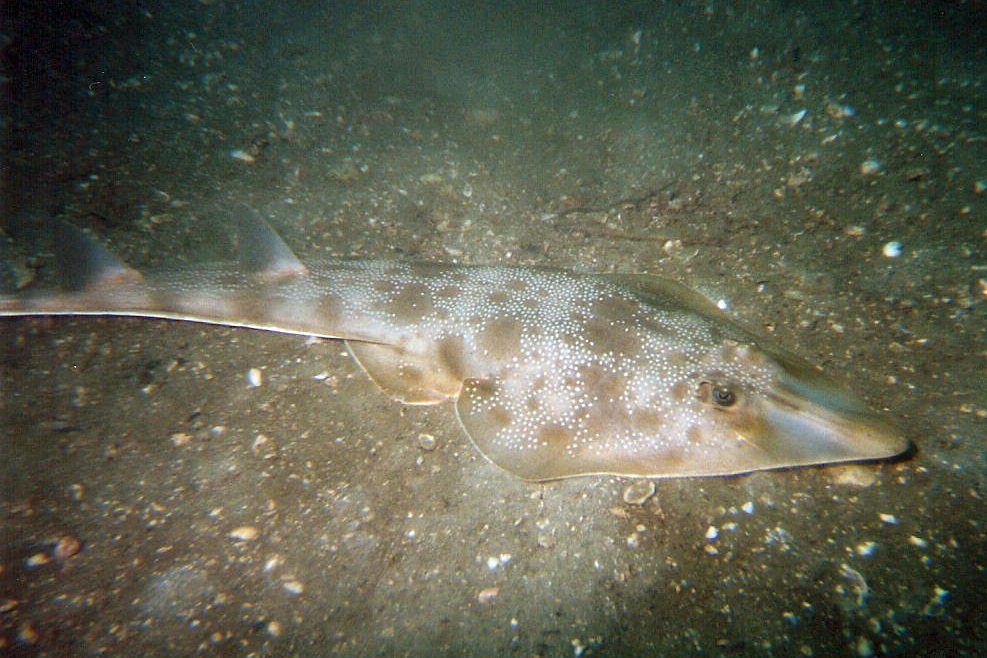
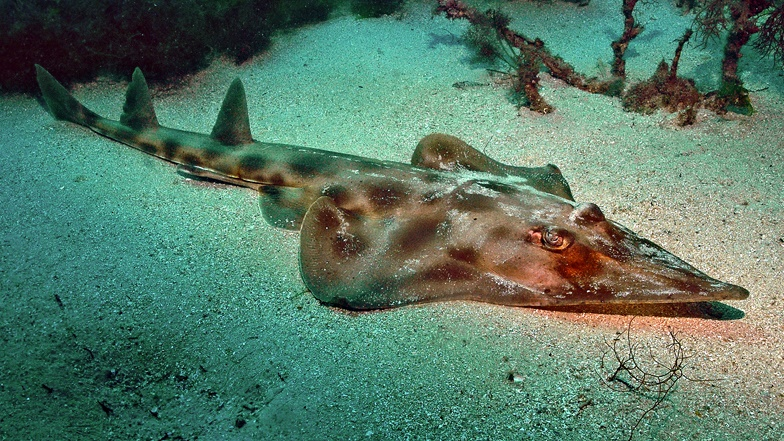
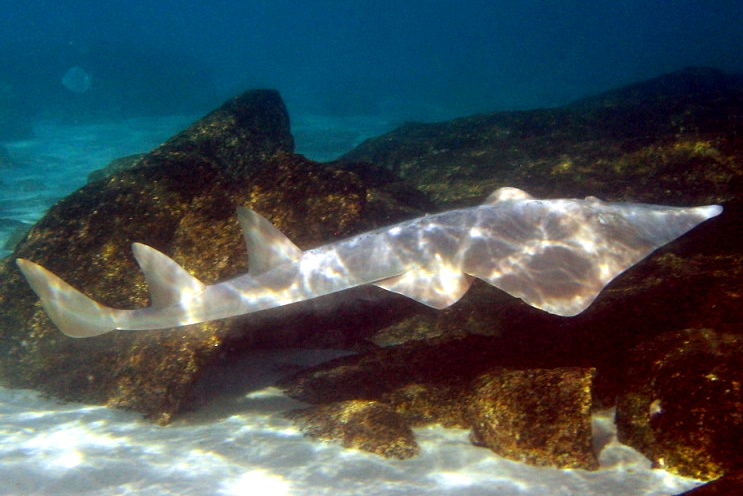
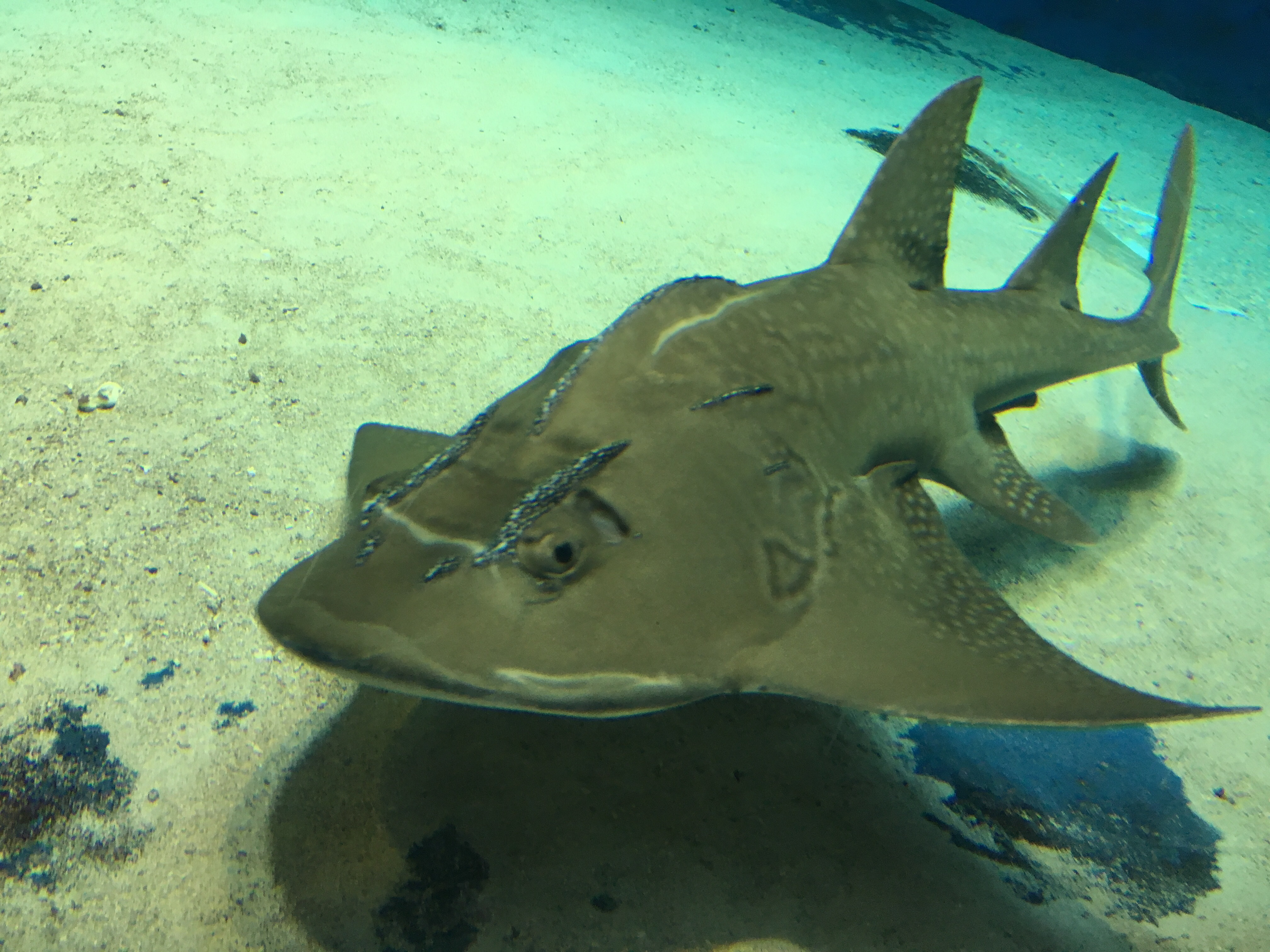
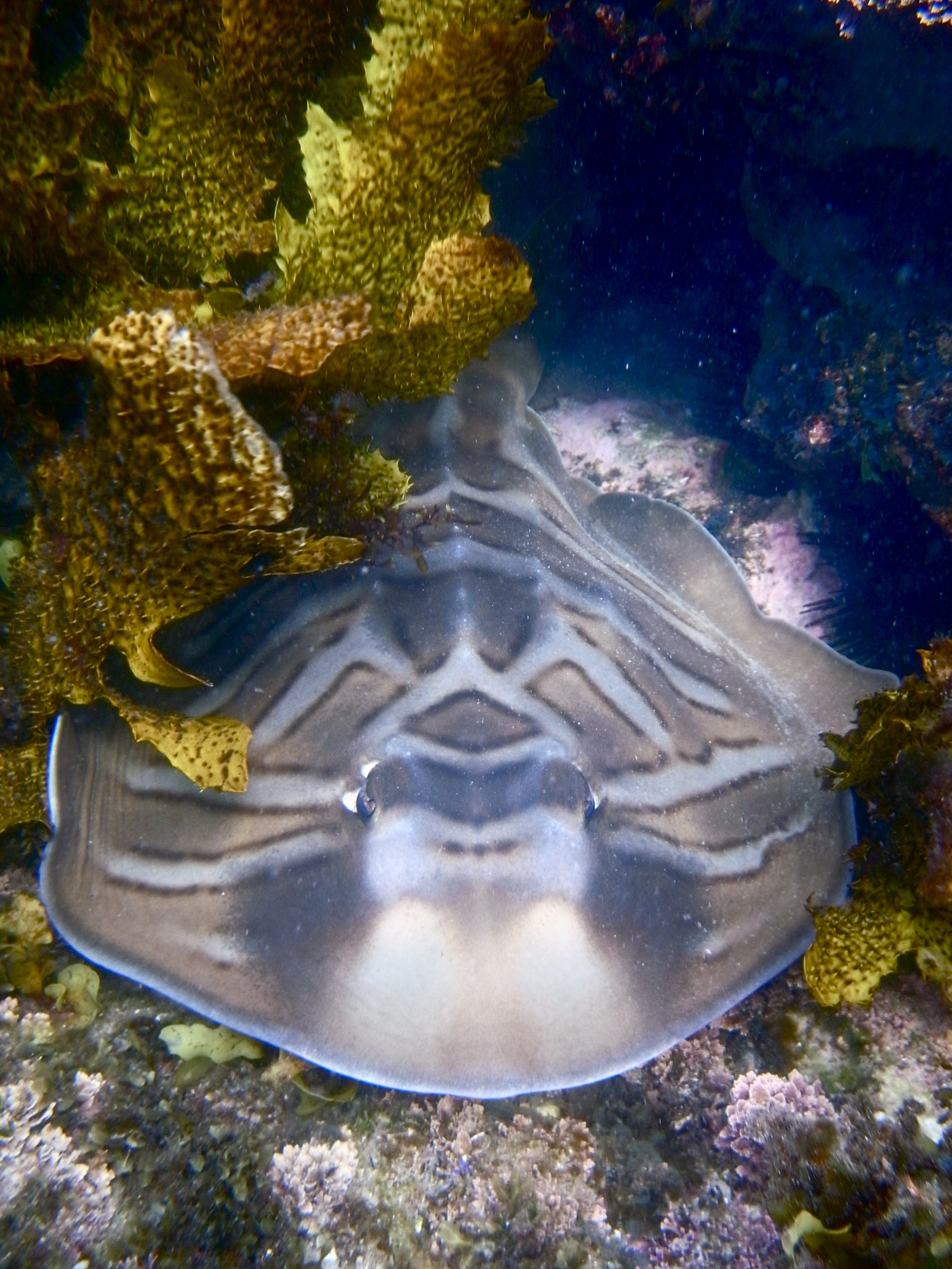
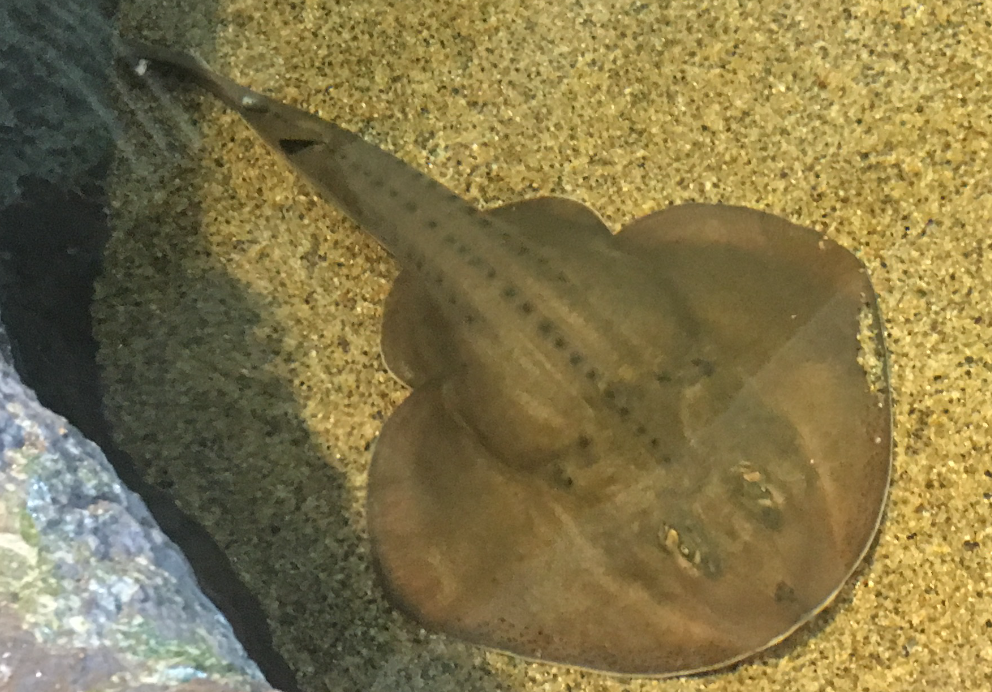
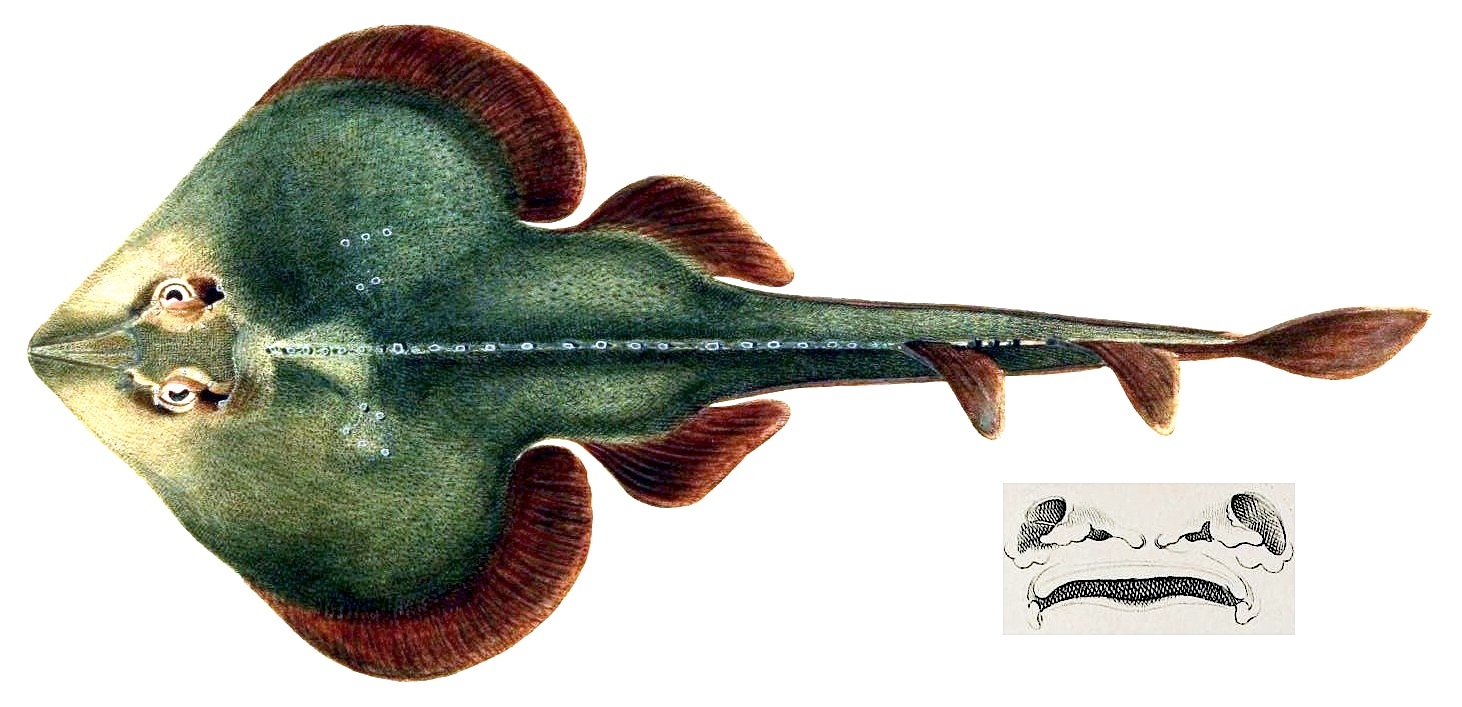
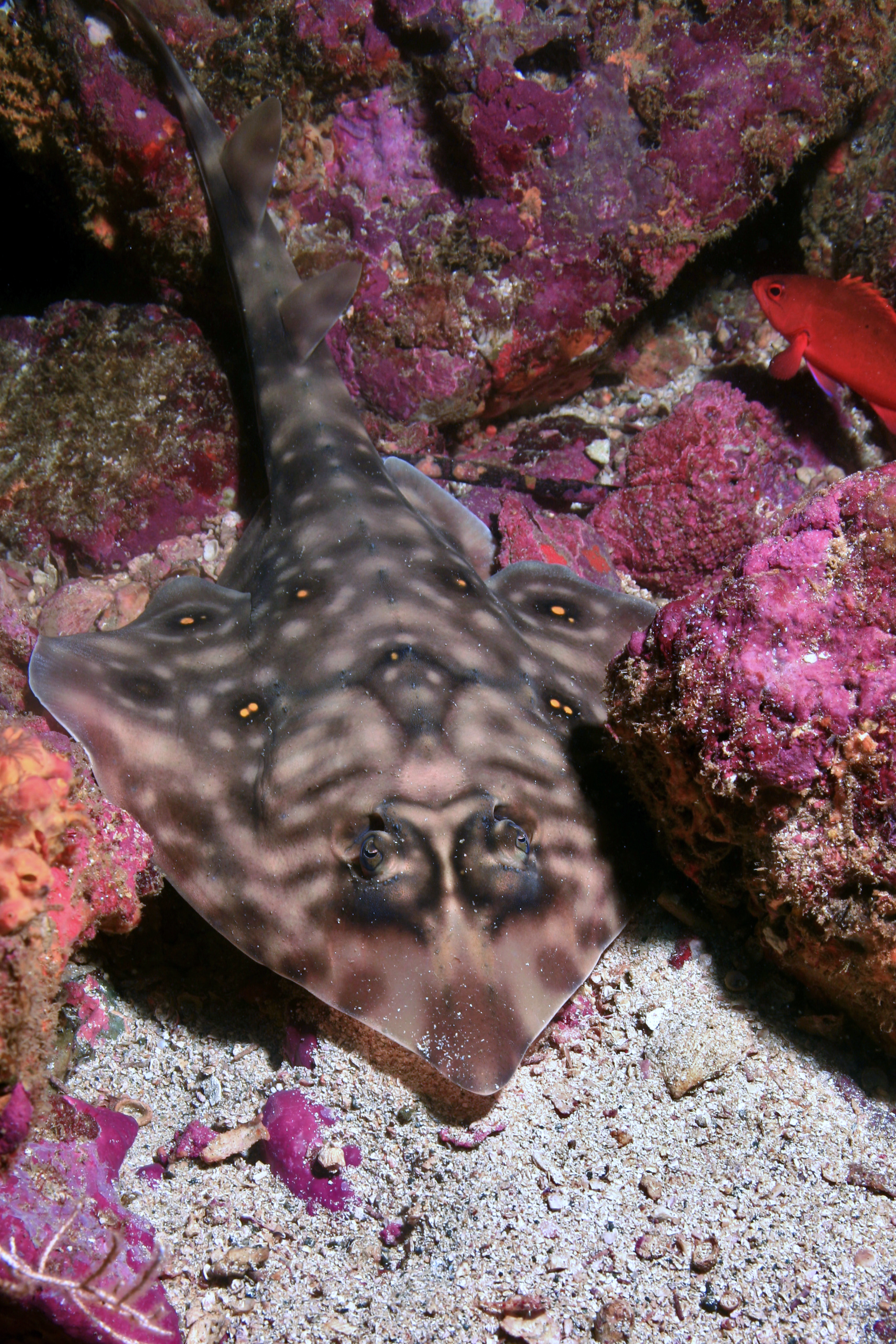
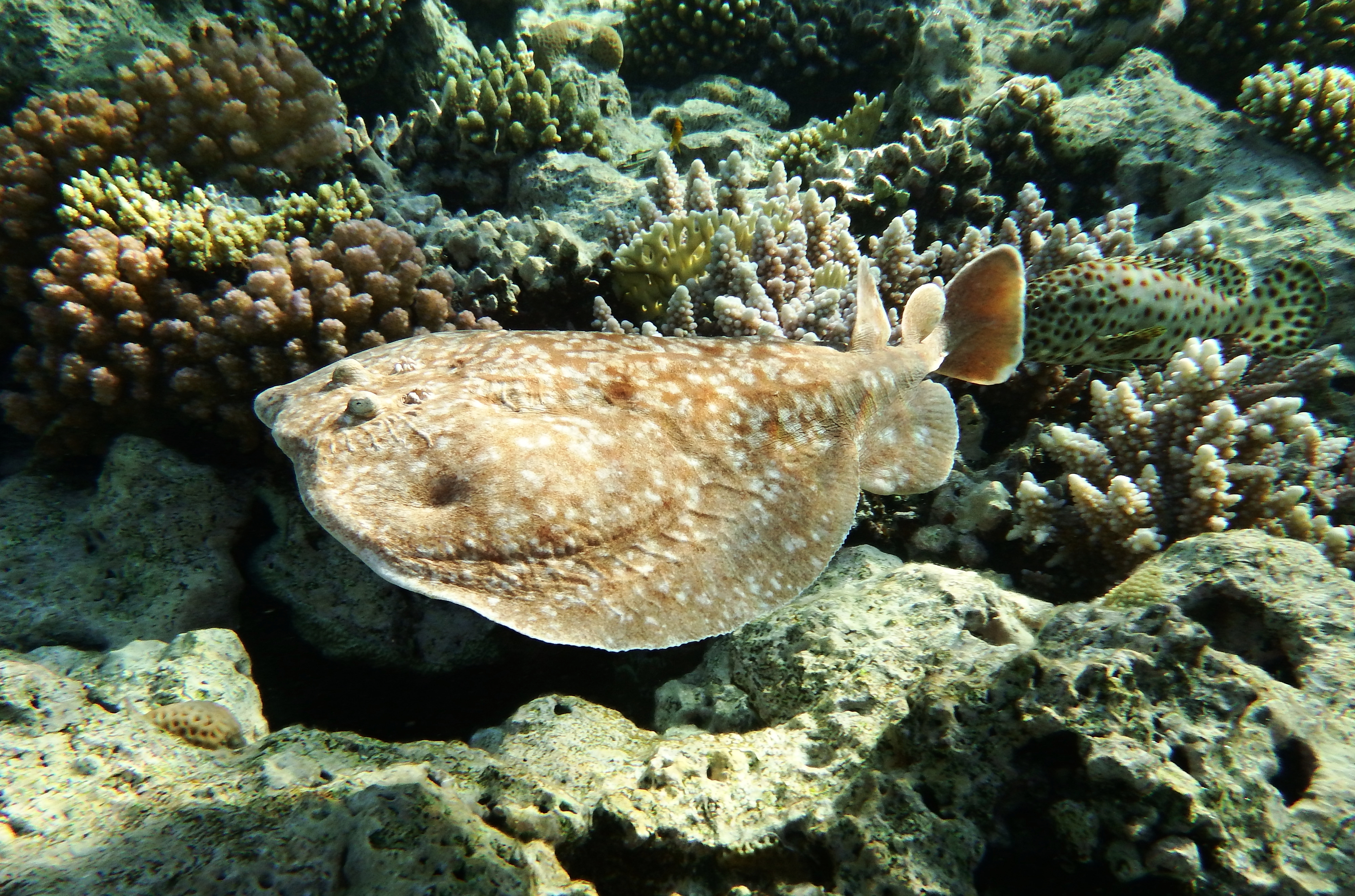
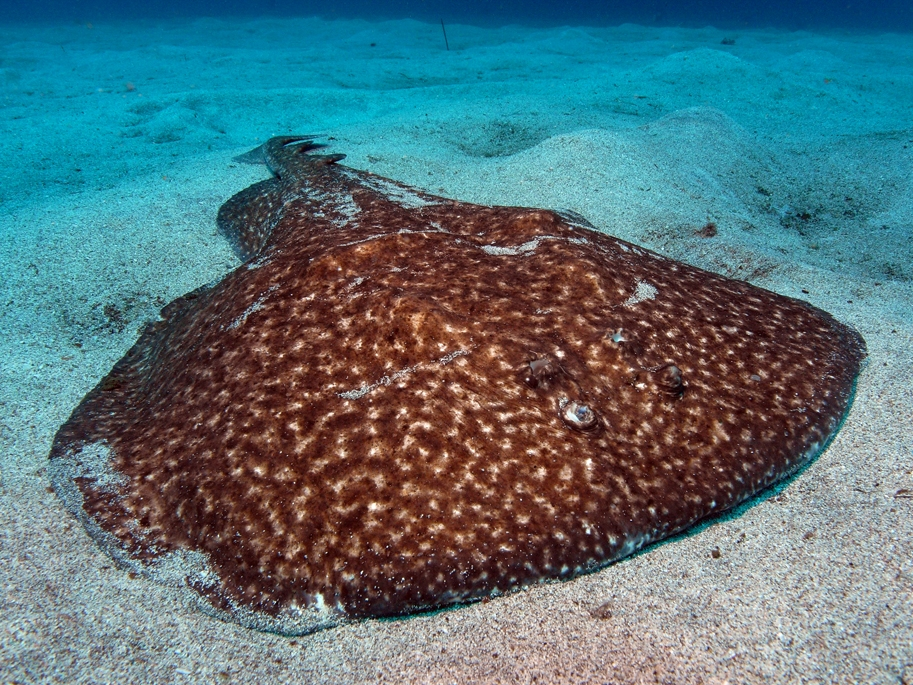
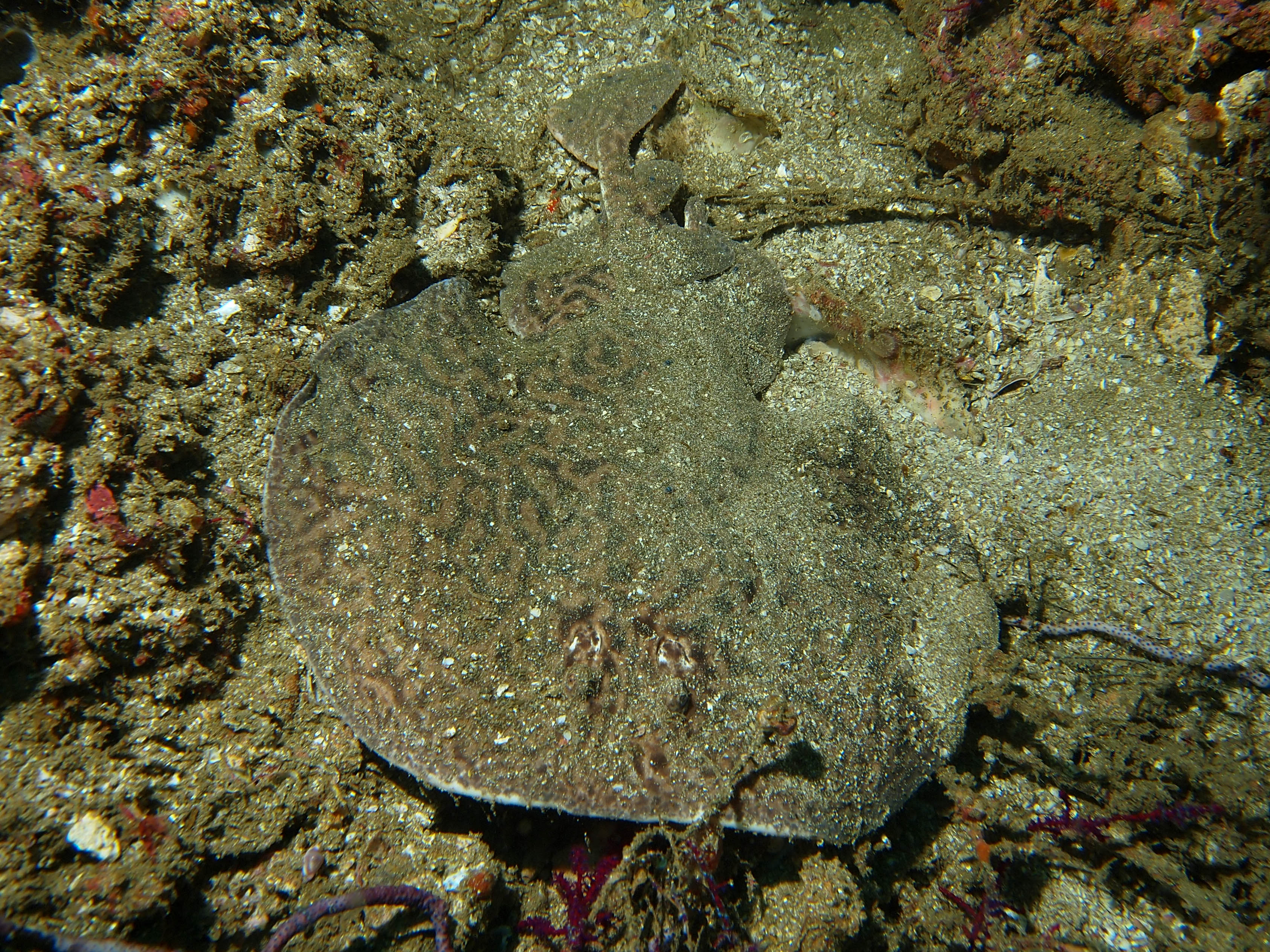
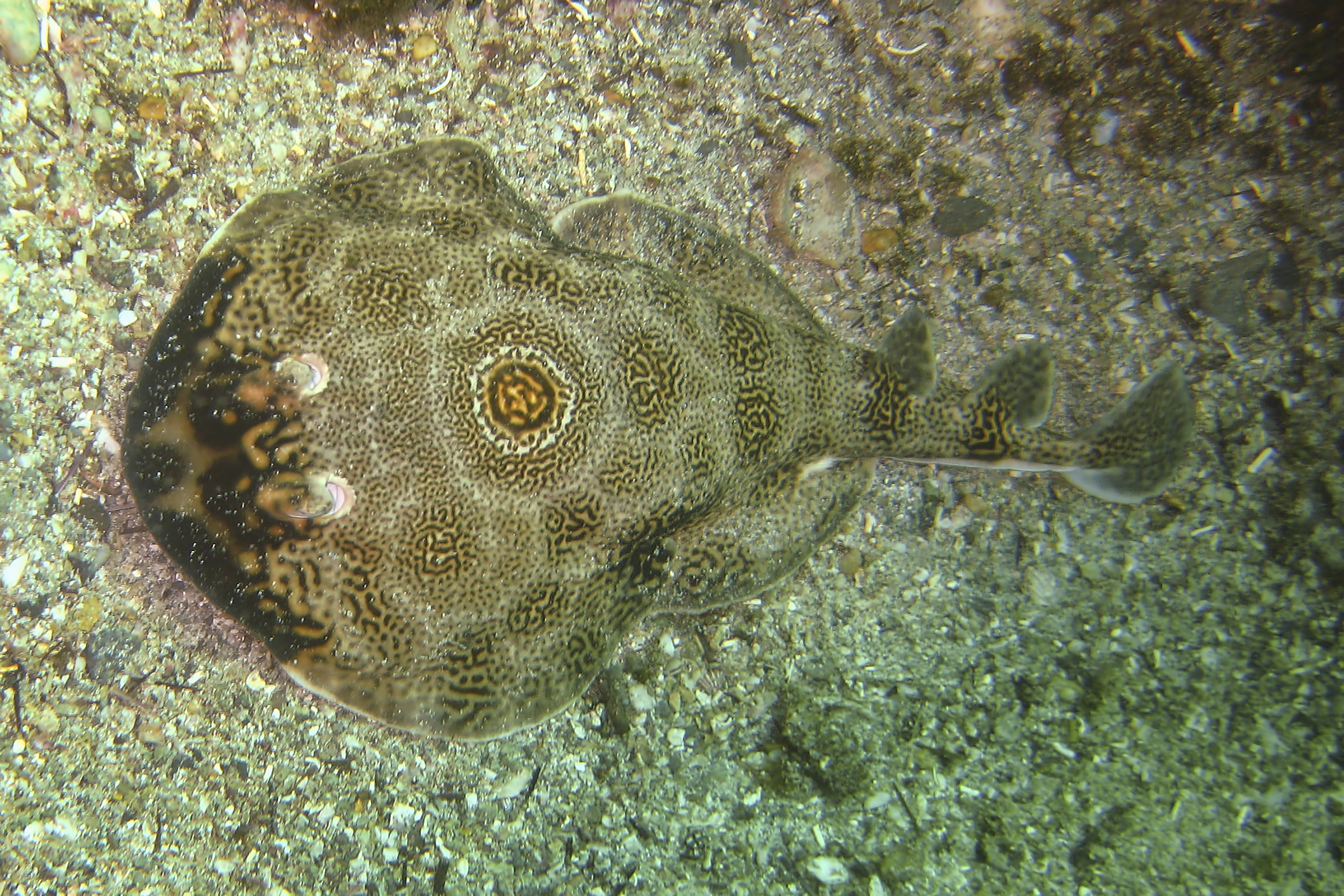
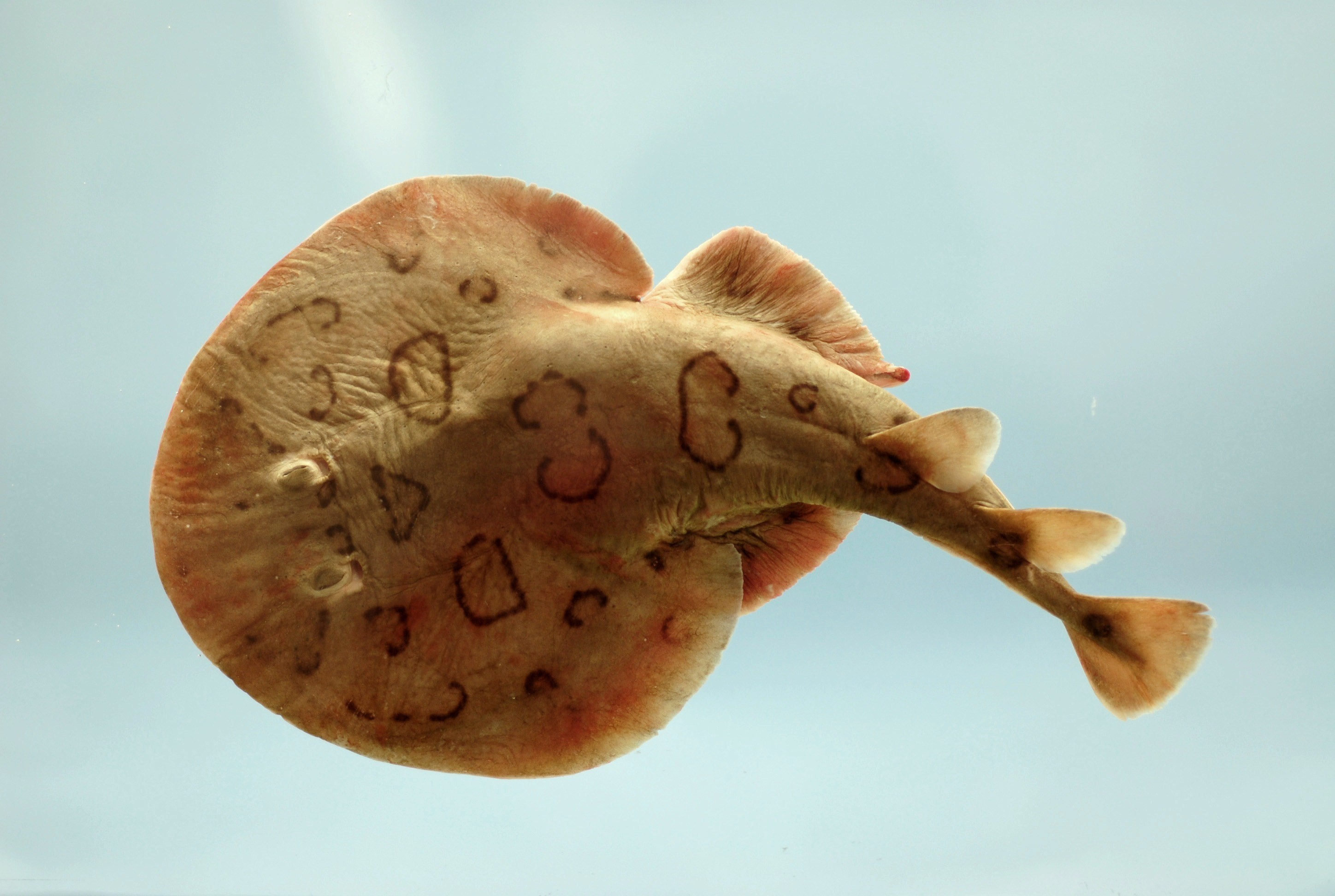
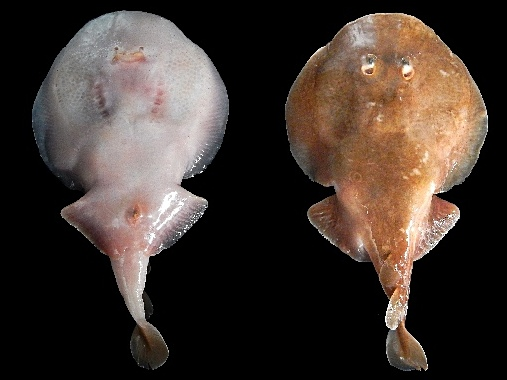
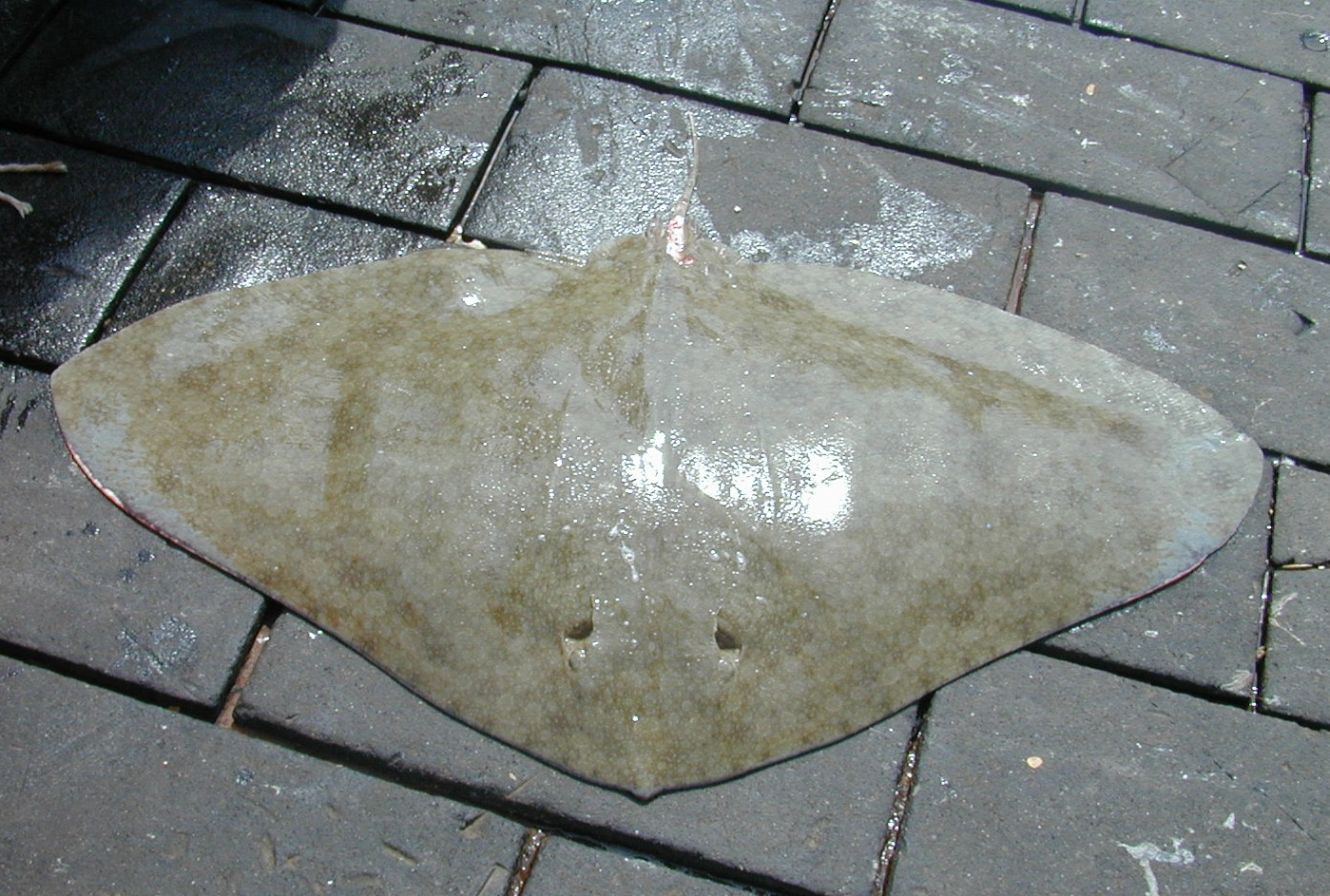
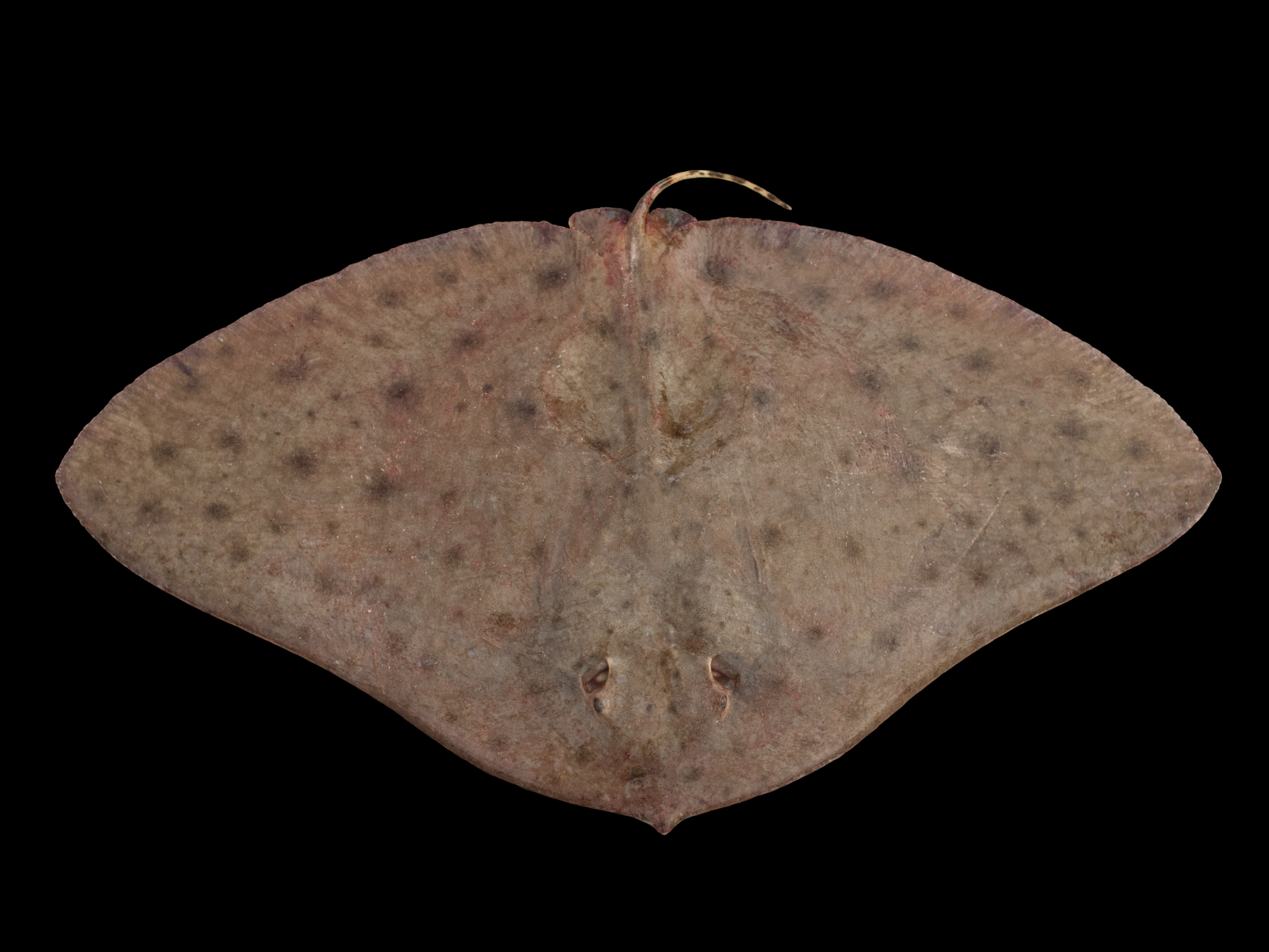
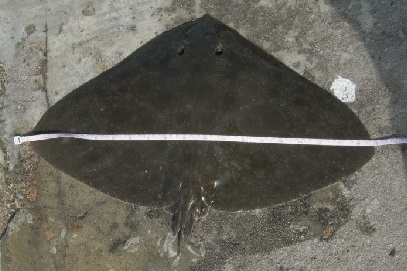
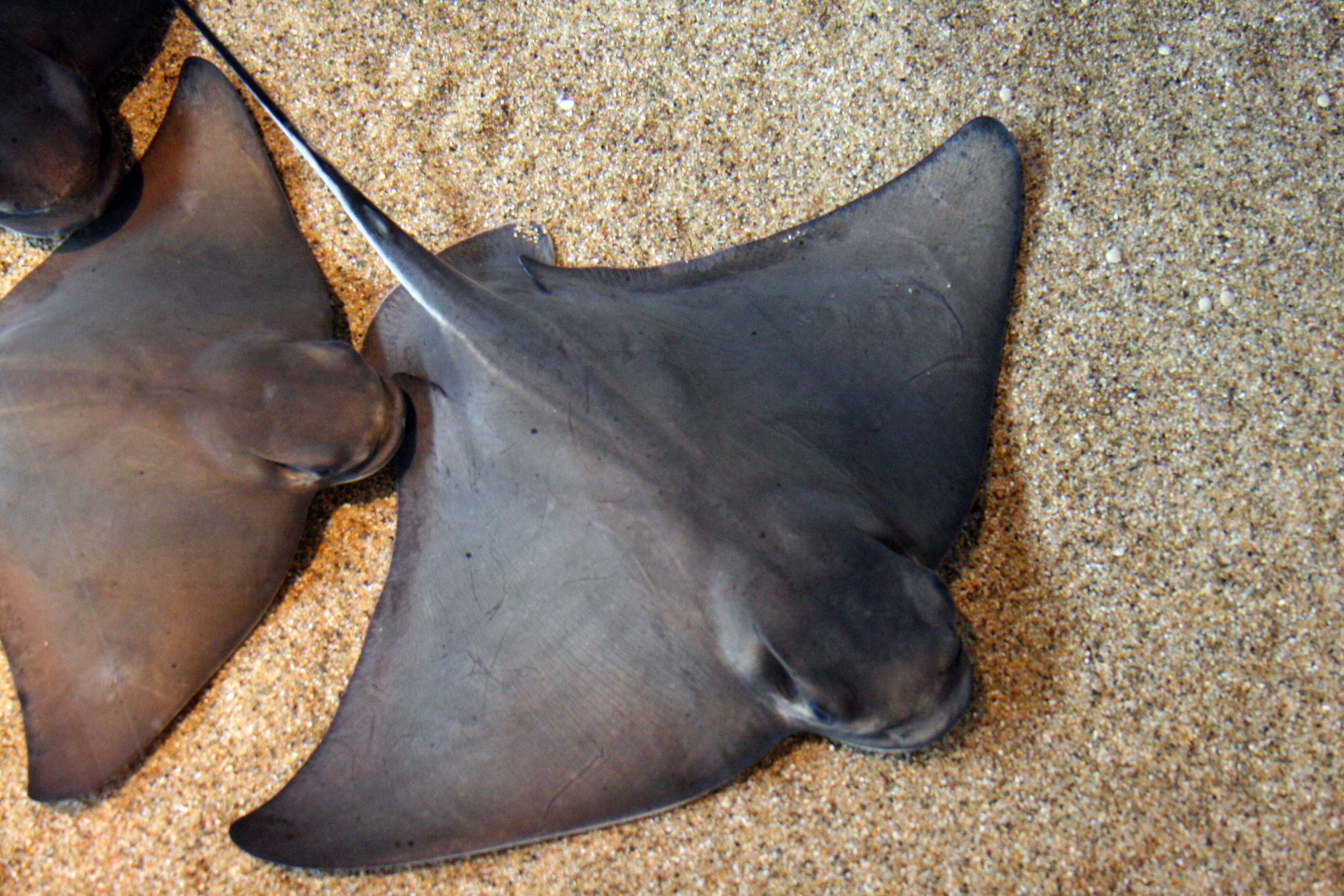
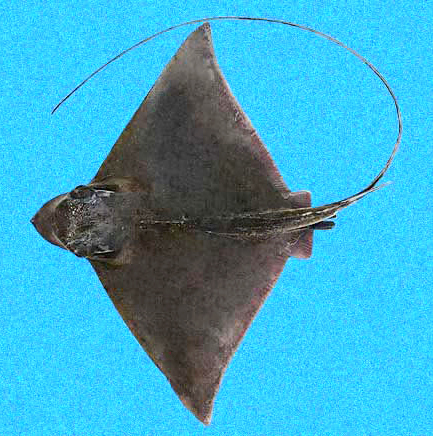
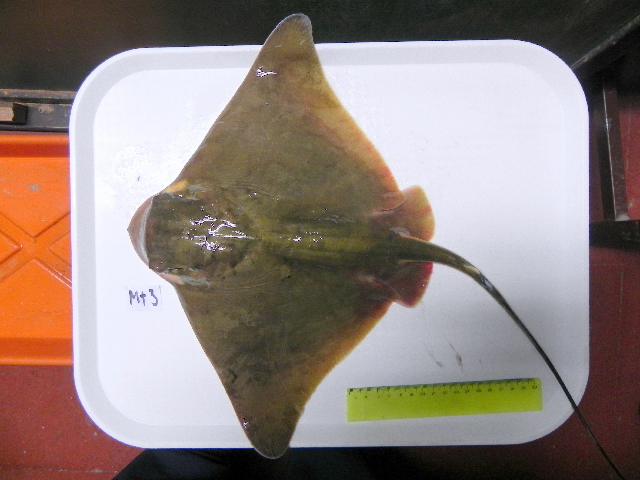
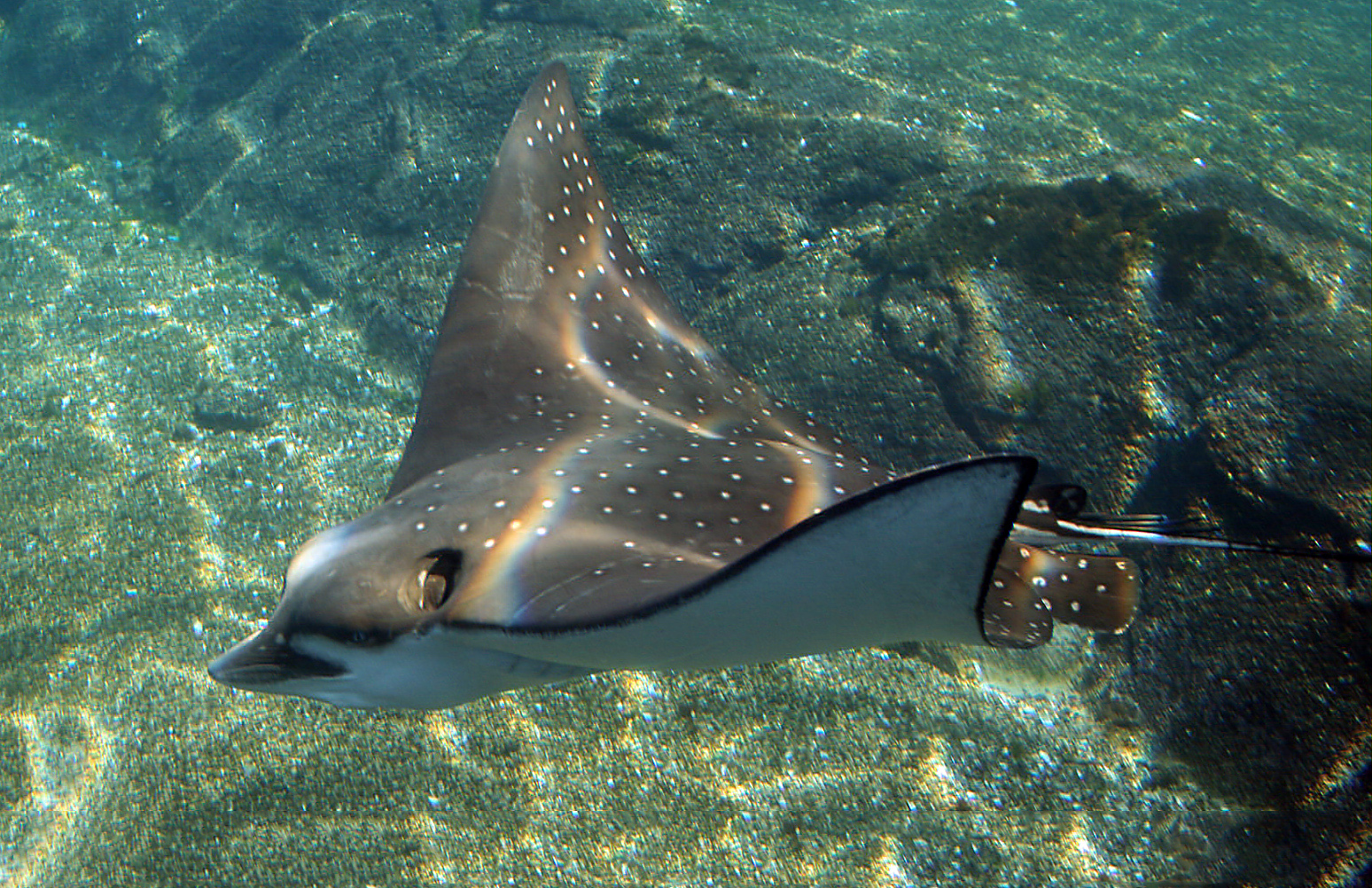
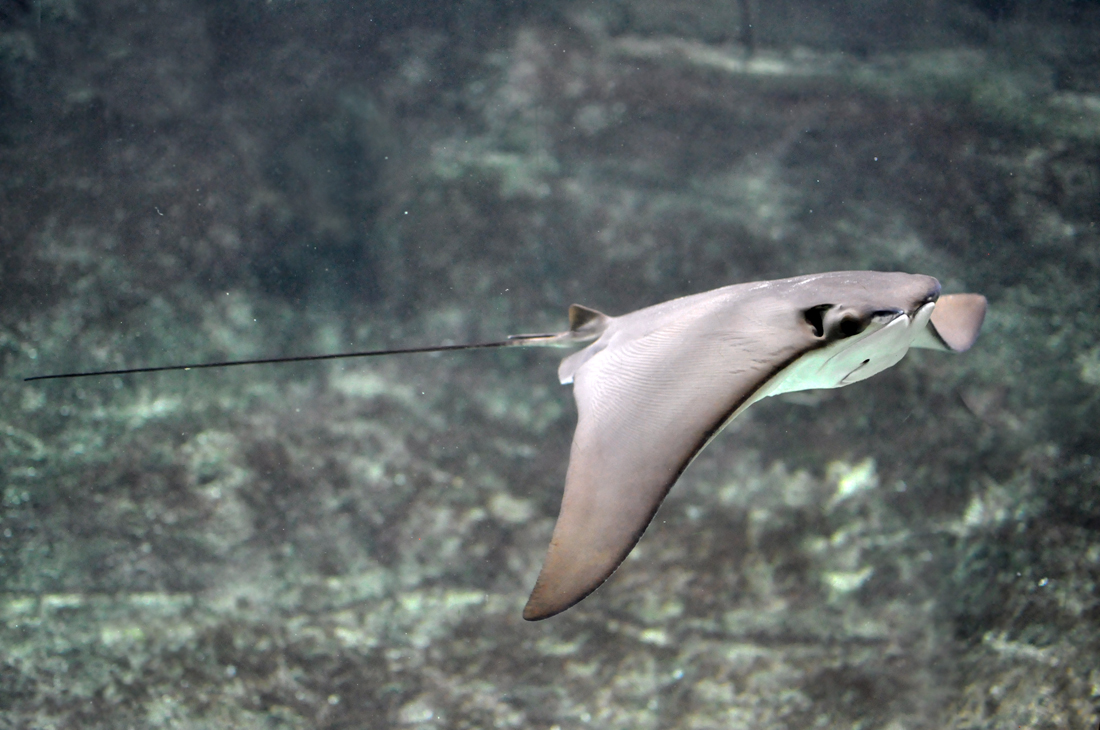
Common name	Image	Taxonomy	Reef safe	Description	Max size
Round stingray		Urobatis halleri	No	Requires a minimum 180 gallon aquarium. Recently purchased individuals can be startled easily by quick movements and loud noises, but they will become relatively tame after spending a while in captivity. Unhealthy individuals will become a light grey color and their markings will fade. Occasionally called the Cortez ray and thus misidentified as Urobatis maculatus.	58 cm (22.8 in)
Cortez round stingray		Urobatis maculatus	No	Requires a minimum 180 gallon aquarium and is hardy and attains a small size although rarely available. May be misidentified with Urobatis halleri as that species is occasionally called the Cortez ray.	42 cm (16.5 in)
Bullseye round stingray		Urobatis concentricus	No	Requires a minimum 180 gallon aquarium. An occasionally available. A hardy species.	47.5 cm (18.7 in)
Leopard round stingray		Urobatis pardalis	No	Probably is a hardy species.	46.2 cm (18.2 in)
Yellow stingray		Urobatis jamaicensis	No	Requires a minimum 180 gallon aquarium and readily acclimates to suitable captive environments. It is also readily available in the aquarium trade and will eat any small fish that it can catch.	76 cm (29.9 in)
Chilean round ray		Urotrygon chilensis	No	Requires a minimum 180 gallon aquarium. It is small and well suited for captivity.	41.9 cm (16.5 in)
Bluespotted ribbontail ray		Taeniura lymma	No	Requires a minimum 260 gallon aquarium. It is notorious for doing terribly in aquarium confines. Many individuals never eat and others may die or stop feeding for no apparent reason. Force-feeding shows promise with this species. Not to confused with the Bluespotted stingray Neotrygon kuhlii.	35 cm (13.8 in)
Bluespotted stingray		Neotrygon kuhlii	No	Requires a minimum 260 gallon aquarium and is quite hardy, however it should not be disturbed as it acclimates to aquarium life (which takes around 2–3 days). Provide it with a 5 cm (2 in) deep fine sand bed. Do not confuse this species with the much less hardy Bluespotted ribbontail ray Taeniura lymma.	70 cm (27.6 in)
Southern stingray		Hypanus americanus	No	Requires a minimum 4,200 gallon aquarium as this ray grows to a very large size. It is quite hardy, yet it will devour any fish or invertebrate it can capture.	200 cm (78.7 in)
Atlantic stingray		Hypanus sabinus	No	Requires a minimum 135 gallon aquarium. Is relatively small yet may or may not easily adapt to life in an aquarium. It is best kept in saltwater or brackish systems although they can survive in freshwater.	61 cm (24.0 in)
Bluntnose Stingray		Hypanus say	No	Requires a minimum 560 gallon aquarium. Well suited to captive life.	100 cm (39.4 in)
Reticulated whiptail ray		Himantura uarnak	No	Due to its massive proportions, this occasionally available ray should be avoided.	200 cm (78.7 in)
Red stingray		Hemitrygon akajei	No	Requires a water temperature of in between 15 °C (59.0 °F) and 25 °C (77.0 °F).	200 cm (78.7 in)
Cowtail stingray		Pastinachus sephen	No	Like other Whiptail stingrays, Pastinachus sephen should be provided with an aquarium containing a sand bed and little aquascaping.	183 cm (72.0 in)
Common stingaree		Trygonoptera testacea	No	Seems to be well suited to captive life.	47 cm (18.5 in)
Striped stingaree		Trygonoptera ovalis	No?	Seems to be well suited to captive life although it should be kept at cool temperatures.	61 cm (24.0 in)
Spotted stingaree		Urolophus gigas	No	Seems to be well suited to captive life.	70 cm (27.6 in)
Shovelnose guitarfish		Pseudobatos productus	No	Requires a minimum 825 gallon aquarium with a 7 cm (2.7 in) deep sand bed and no rockwork. May live for 8 to 10 years in an aquarium.	119 cm (46.9 in)
Atlantic guitarfish		Pseudobatos lentiginosus	No	Requires a minimum 200 gallon aquarium preferably with no aquascaping. Uncommon in the aquarium trade.	76 cm (29.9 in)
Speckled guitarfish		Pseudobatos glaucostigmus	No	Like other guitarfish, it should be kept in an aquarium with a sand bed, much open swimming area, and little rockwork.	89 cm (35.0 in)
Eastern shovelnose ray		Aptychotrema rostrata	No	Like other guitarfish, it should be kept in an aquarium with a sand bed, much open swimming area, and little rockwork.	100 cm (39.4 in)
Giant shovelnose ray		Glaucostegus typus	No	Like other guitarfish, it should be kept in an aquarium with a sand bed, much open swimming area, and little rockwork.	270 cm (106.3 in)
Bowmouth guitarfish		Rhina ancylostoma	No	Like other guitarfish, it should be kept in an aquarium with a sand bed, much open swimming area, and little rockwork. Also called the Shark ray and the Mud skate.	300 cm (118.1 in)
Eastern fiddler ray		Trygonorrhina fasciata	No	Requires a minimum 560 gallon aquarium. It is durable but it may have trouble feeding with more agile bony fish tankmates.	126 cm (49.6 in).
Thornback ray		Platyrhinoidis triseriata	No	Requires a minimum 360 gallon aquarium without any aquascaping. It may consume benthic fishes and its thorns are tangled in nets easily.	91 cm (35.8 in)
Shortnose guitarfish		Zapteryx brevirostris	No	Requires a minimum 200 gallon aquarium with little aquascaping and preferably a sand bed. Given such an environment, it will readily adapt to captive life. It can create a cave by lifting the center of its body off the ground to lure in potential prey.	59.3 cm (23.3 in)
Banded guitarfish		Zapteryx exasperata	No	Requires a minimum 300 gallon aquarium with a sand bed, much open swimming area, and little rockwork, and a ledge under which to hide under. Under such conditions, it is somewhat hardy. It is rarely encountered in the aquarium trade.	97 cm (38.2 in)
Southern banded guitarfish		Zapteryx xyster	No	Is rarely available. Like other guitarfish, it should be kept in an aquarium with a sand bed, much open swimming area, and little rockwork.	78 cm (30.7 in)
Leopard torpedo ray		Torpedo panthera	No	Requires a minimum 180 gallon aquarium with a thick sand bed and little to no decoration. Like other species in the genus Torpedo, Large individuals should be carefully handled as they are capable of shocking their owners. This ray should be kept alone.	100 cm (39.4 in)
Marbled electric ray		Torpedo marmorata	No	It is relatively hardy although it usually will only target moving food. Like other species in the genus Torpedo, Large individuals should be carefully handled as they are capable of shocking their owners. It should also be kept in an aquarium with a thick sand bed and little to no decoration. Not to be confused with the Marbled electric ray (Torpedo sinuspersici).	100 cm (39.4 in)
Marbled electric ray		Torpedo sinuspersici	No	Occasionally available to European hobbyists. It is relatively hardy although it usually will only target moving food. Like other species in the genus Torpedo, Large individuals should be carefully handled as they are capable of shocking their owners. It should also be kept in an aquarium with a thick sand bed and little to no decoration. Not to be confused with the Marbled electric ray (Torpedo marmorata).	130 cm (51.2 in)
Bullseye electric ray		Diplobatis ommata	No	Requires a minimum 40 gallon aquarium and is hard to feed. Like the Lesser electric ray, it can be sustained if fed live food including small grass shrimp and annelid worms and should also be provided with a sand bed 6 cm (2.3 in) deep. Also like the Lesser electric ray, it may shock other tankmates, yet it can be kept with others of its own kind. It is rarely encountered in the aquarium trade.	25 cm (9.8 in)
Lesser electric ray		Narcine bancroftii	No	Requires a minimum 70 gallon aquarium. Like the Bullseye electric ray, it can be kept successfully if fed live food such as annelid worms and provided with a layer of sand 6 cm (2.3 in) deep. This ray may shock tankmates although they can be kept with other Lesser electric rays.	100 cm (39.4 in)
Brown numbfish		Narcine brunnea	No	Like other rays in the genus Narcine, it is difficult to feed (should be fed annelid worms) and should not be kept with rough surfaced rocks. It can be kept with others of its own kind.	22 cm (8.7 in)
Unknown electric ray		Narcine barinnus	No	Like other rays in the genus Narcine, it is difficult to feed (should be fed annelid worms) and should not be kept with rough surfaced rocks. It can be kept with others of its own kind.	?
Elat electric ray		Heteronarce bentuviai	No?	Also known as the Eilat Sleeper Ray.	17.6 cm (6.9 in)
Spiny butterfly ray		Gymnura altavela	No	Requires a minimum 8,750 gallon aquarium. Like most butterfly rays, it usually does not do well in aquarium confines as it is often hard to feed (thus force feeding shows promise with this species). Also like most butterfly rays, it is an active ray that requires much swimming space like some active sharks. It is rarely available.	400 cm (157.5 in)
Smooth butterfly ray		Gymnura micrura	No	Like most butterfly rays, it usually does not do well in aquarium confines as it is often hard to feed (thus force feeding shows promise with this species). Also like most butterfly rays, it is an active ray that requires much swimming space like some active sharks. It is rarely available.	137 cm (53.9 in)
California butterfly ray		Gymnura marmorata	No	Like most butterfly rays, it usually does not do well in aquarium confines as it is often hard to feed (thus force feeding shows promise with this species). Also like most butterfly rays, it is an active ray that requires much swimming space like some active sharks.	100 cm (39.4 in)
Bat ray		Myliobatis californica	No	Requires a minimum 4,850 gallon aquarium and if given the space, does quite successfully. Unfortunately, they host large amounts of parasites, requiring quarantine and treatments. May jump out of an open aquarium.	180 cm (70.9 in)
Bullnose eagle ray		Myliobatis freminvillei	No	Requires a large system as it is quite large and active.	100 cm (39.4 in)
Southern eagle ray		Myliobatis goodei	No	Requires a large system as it is quite large and active.	125 cm (49.2 in)
Spotted eagle ray		Aetobatus narinari	No	Requires a covered, large system as it is quite large, active, and is capable of leaping out of the water. It can be difficult to feed and is very sensitive to trichlorfon.	330 cm (129.9 in)
Cownose ray		Rhinoptera bonasus	No	Requires a large system in which to live in although it does not need to be deep. Is a schooling fish so keeping several of these rays is recommended. It is also quite active.	213 cm (83.9 in)

== Scorpionfish ==
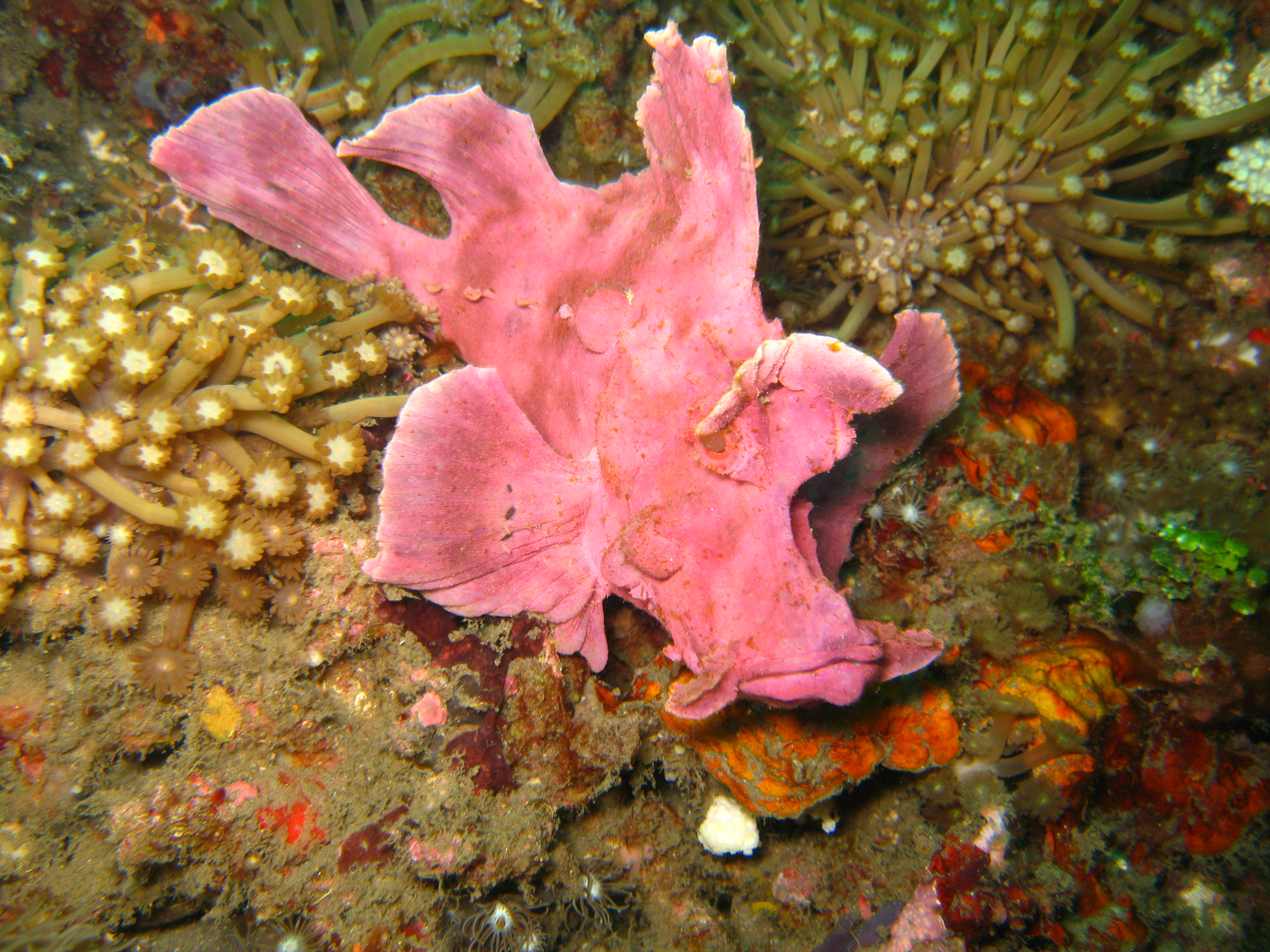
Leaf fish

Because they are relatively inactive fishes, most species can be kept in smaller aquariums than other equally large fish, and 30 gallon tanks are not unusual. Because they are capable of eating fish that are surprisingly large, but will often be picked at by fish that eat invertebrates a species tank is often set up for them. Some fish will never accept anything but live food, typically these specimens are fed on gut packed guppies, mollies, or ghost shrimp. Similarly to the lionfish, care should be taken when handling these fish as they are also venomous.

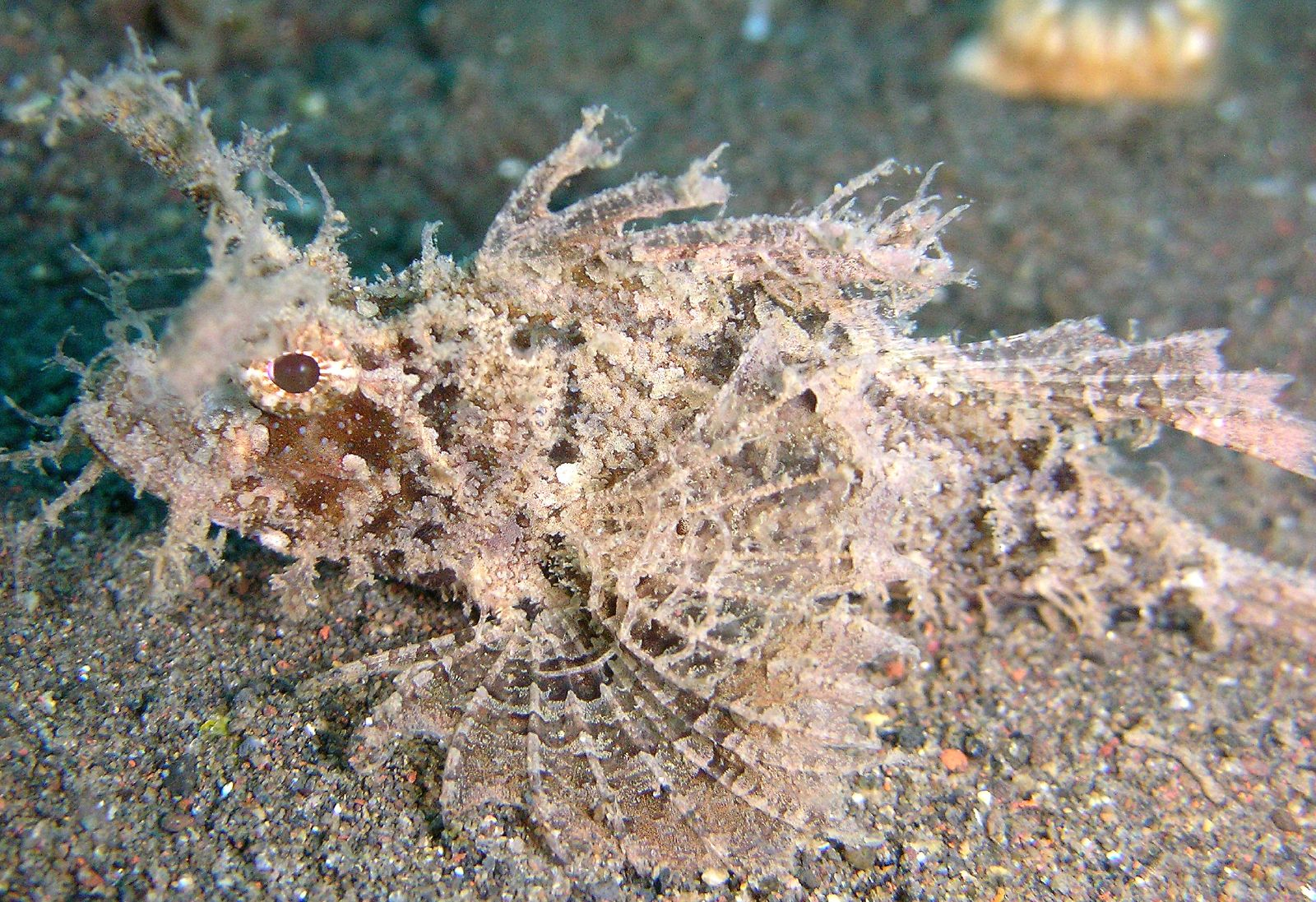
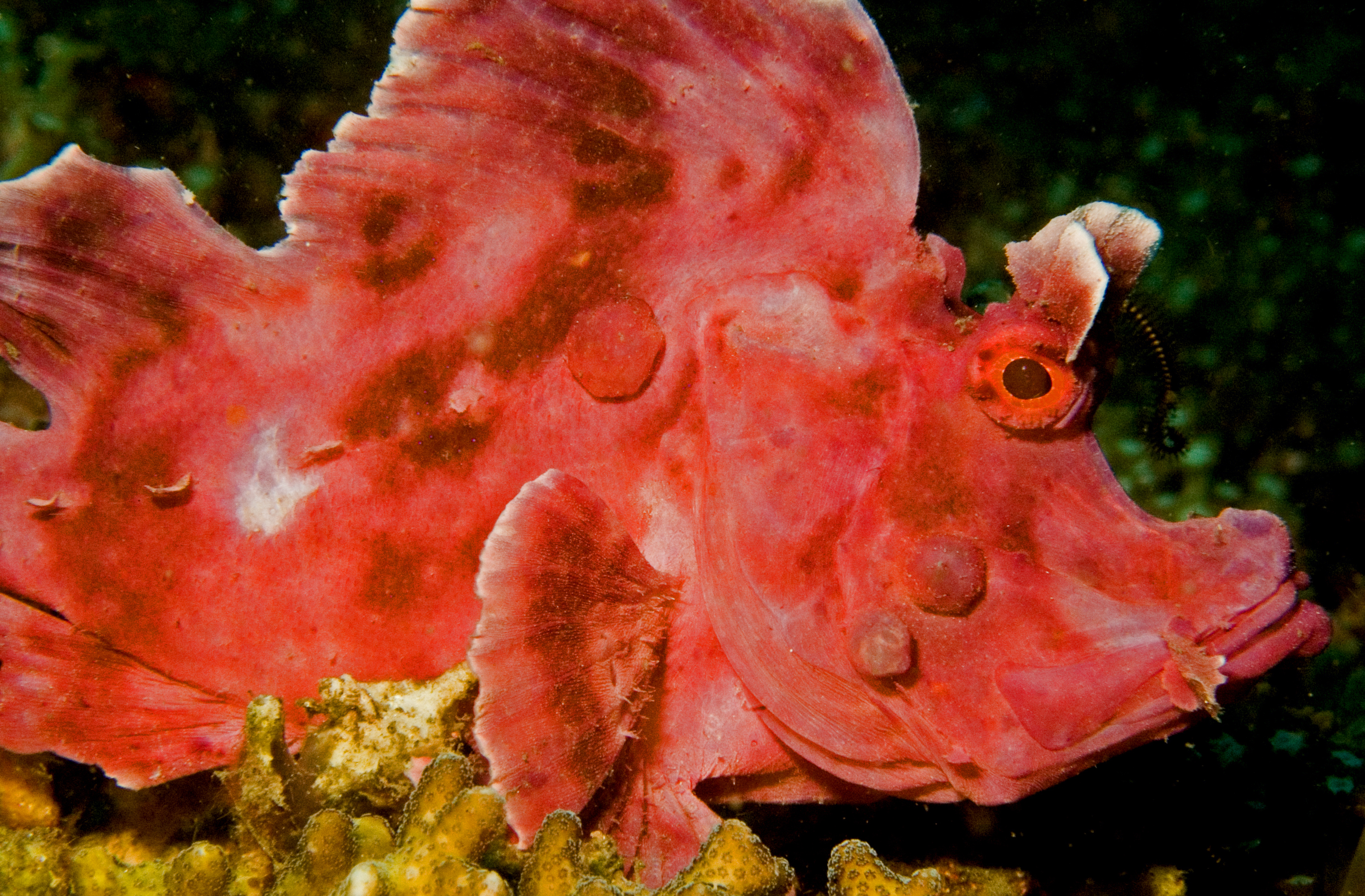
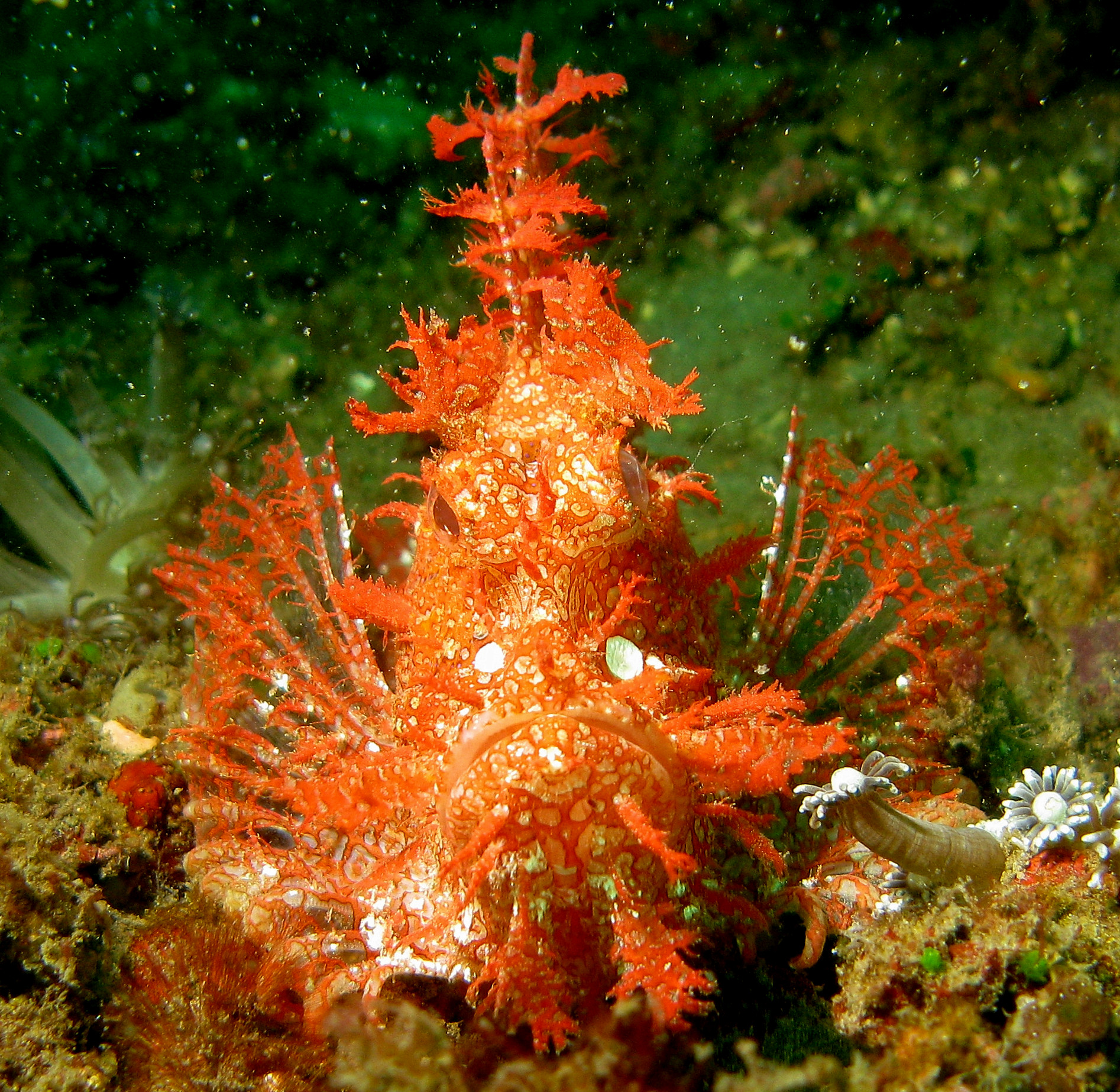
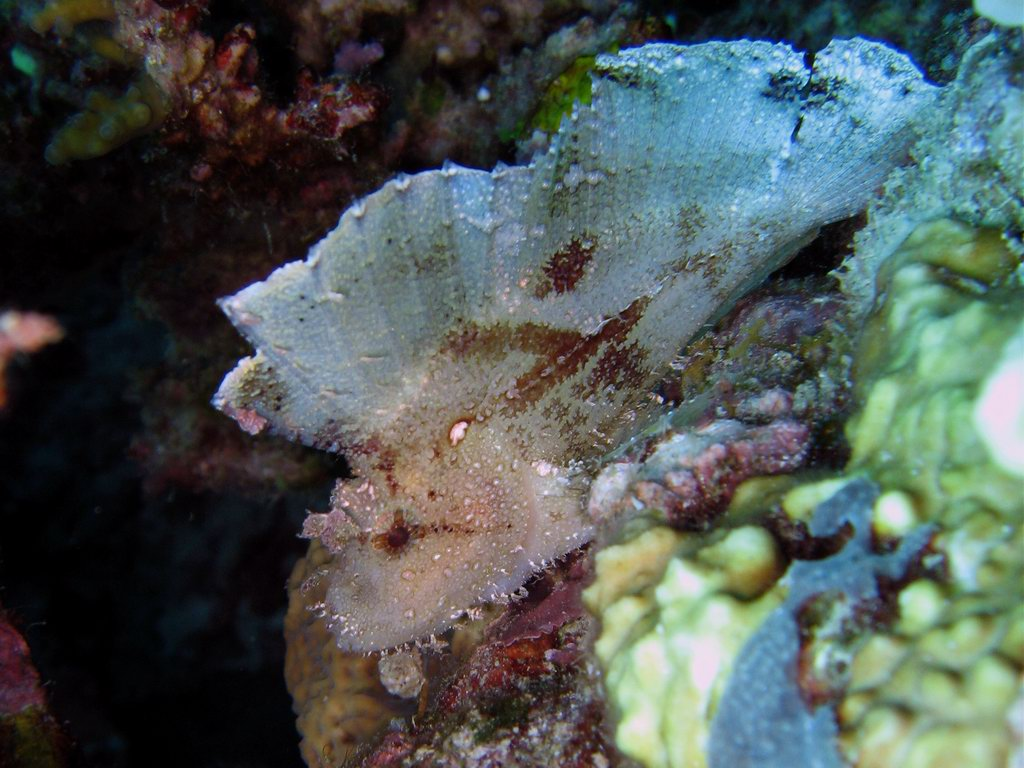
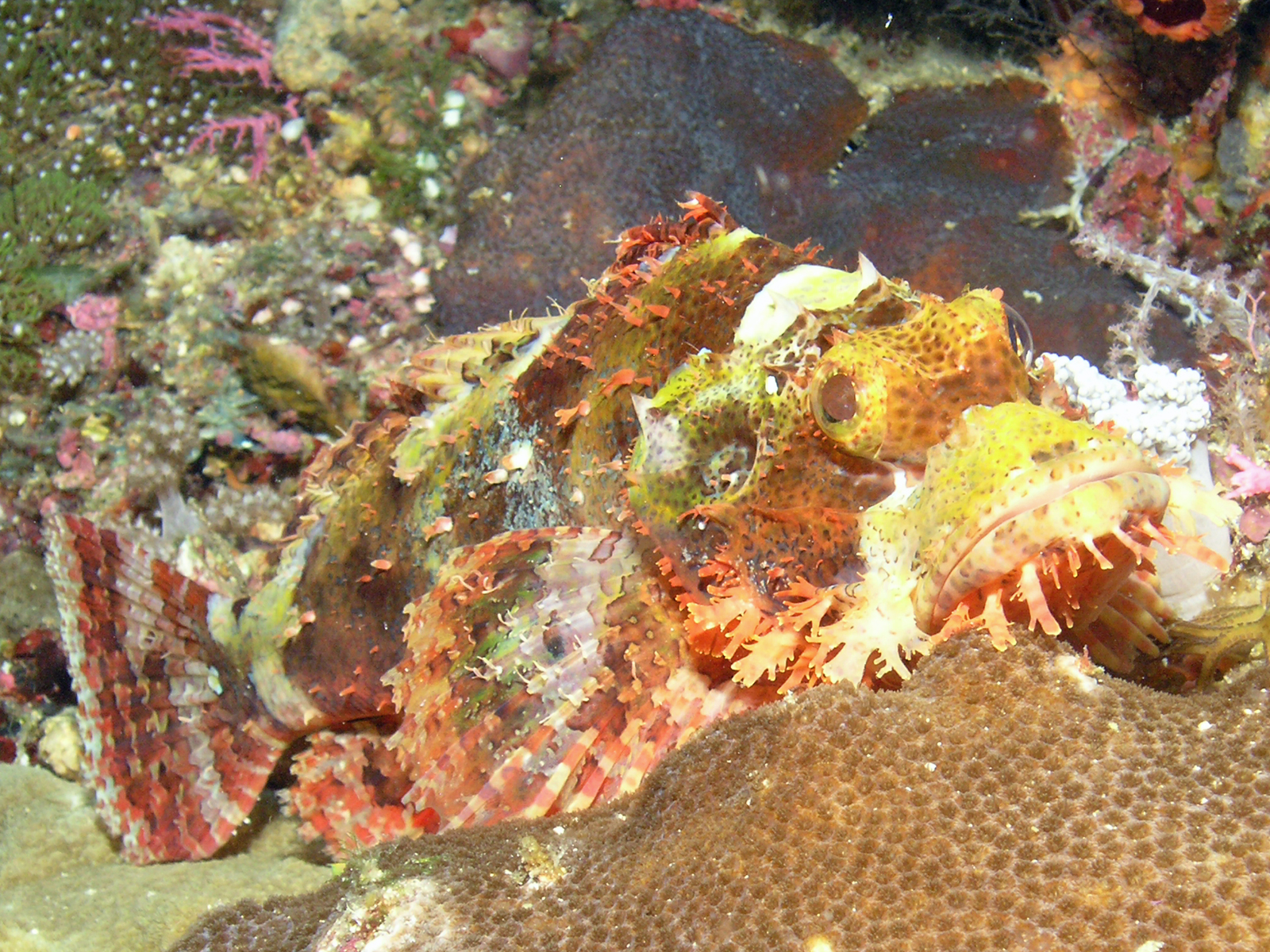
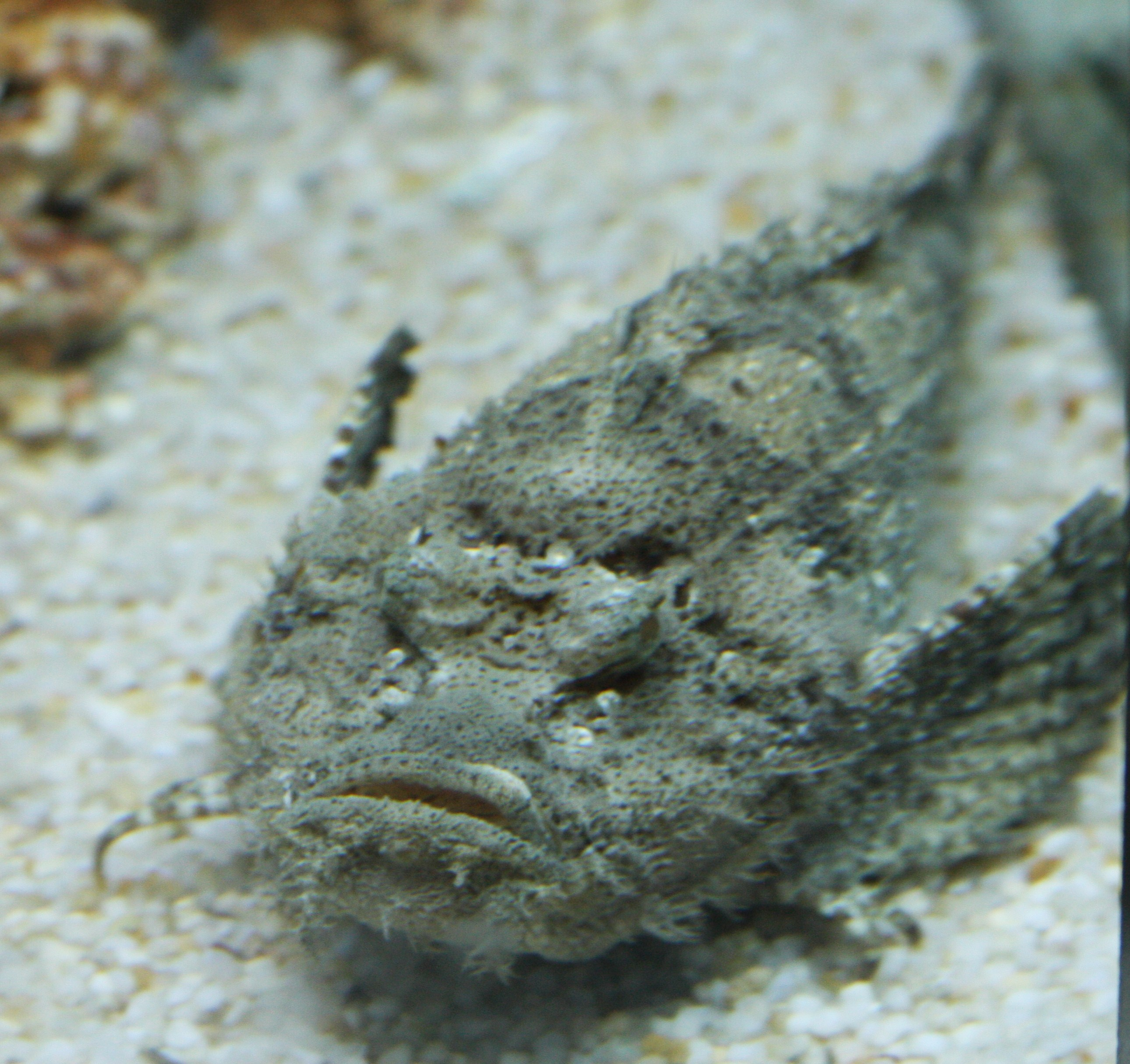
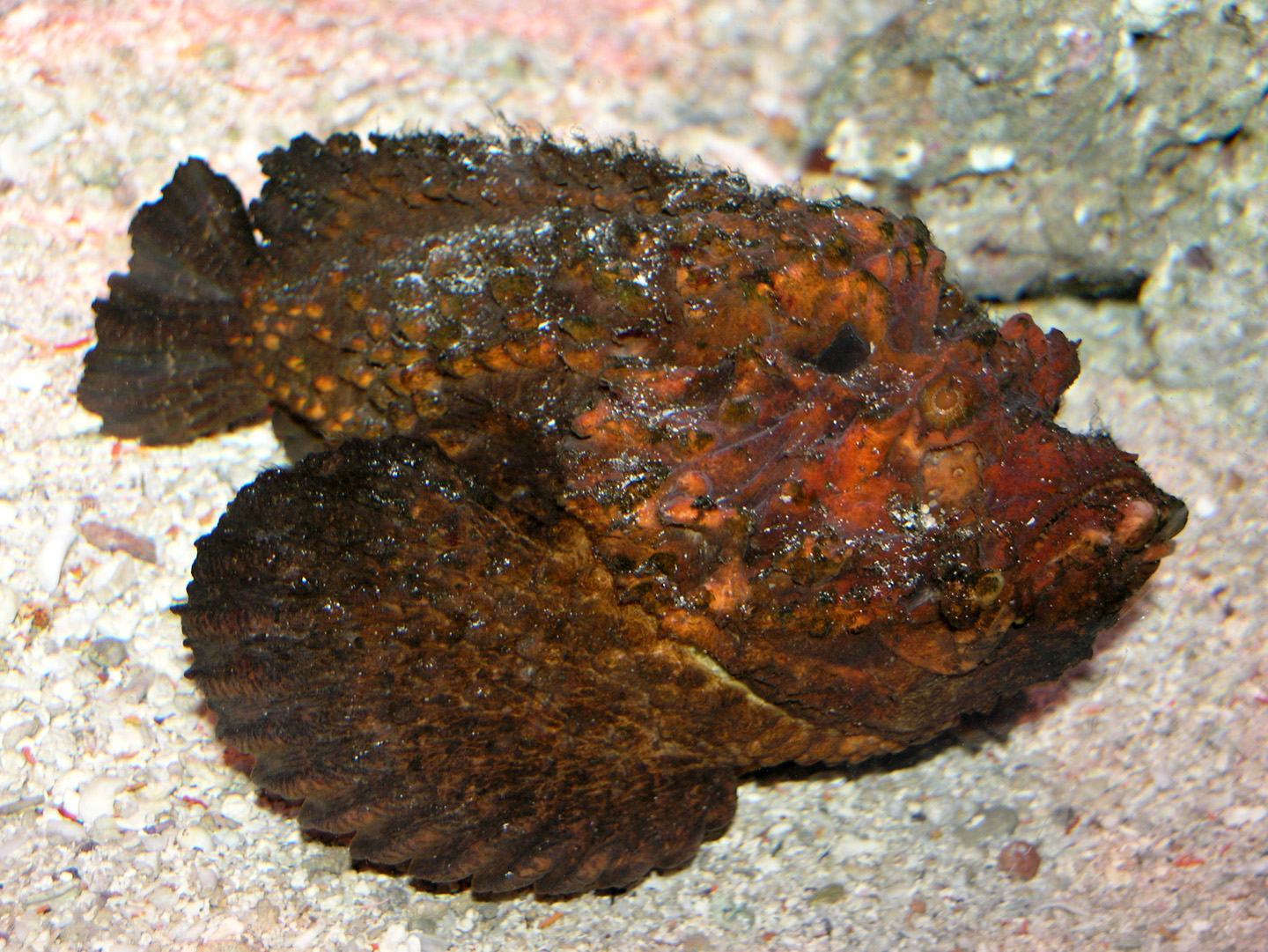
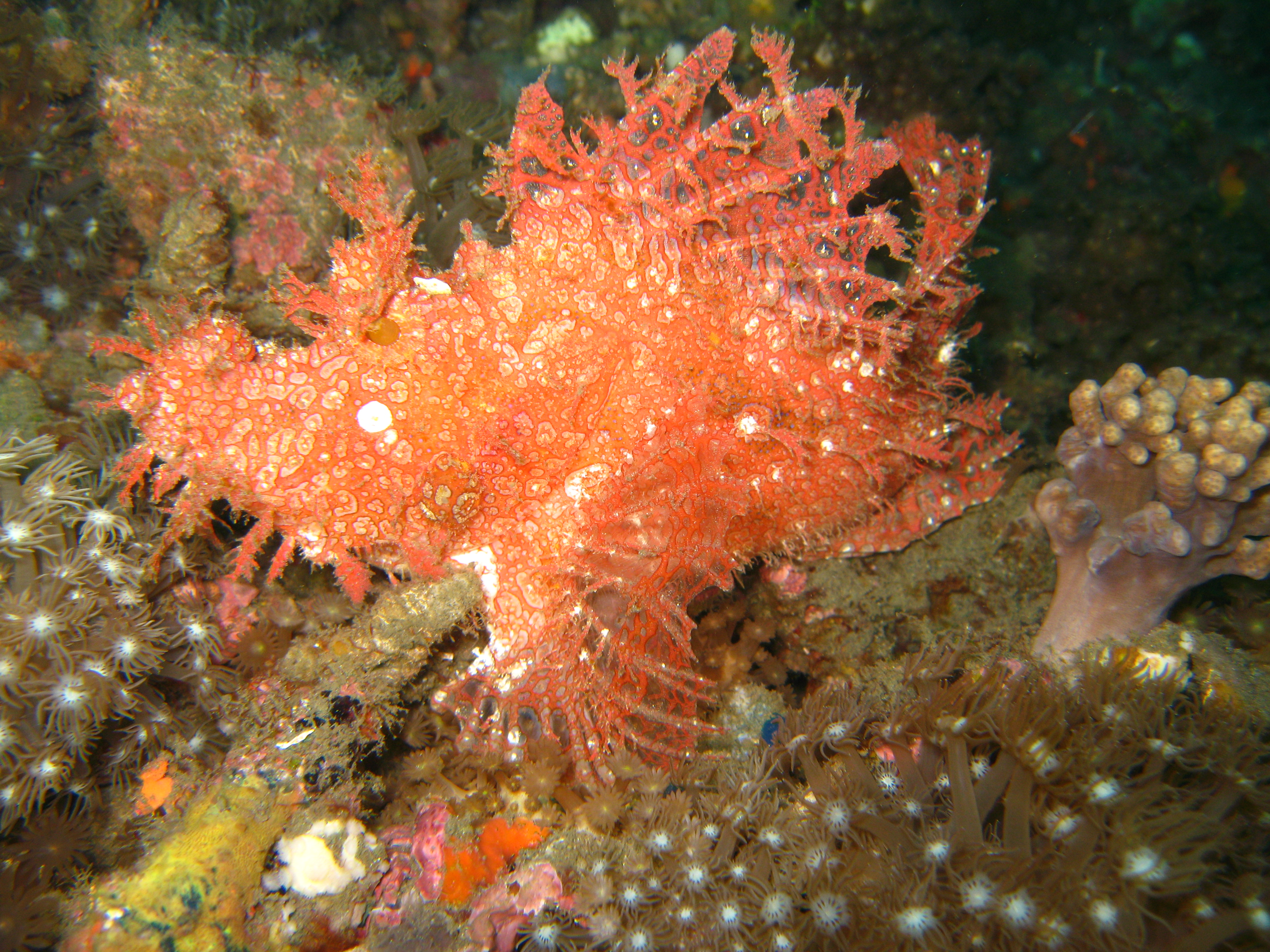
Common name	Image	Taxonomy	Reef safe	Description	Max size
Ambon scorpionfish		Pteroidichthys amboinensis	Not with shrimp or small fish		12 cm (4.7 in)
Decoy scorpionfish		Iracundus signifer	Not with shrimp or small fish		13 cm (5.1 in)
Eschmeyer's scorpionfish		Rhinopias eschmeyeri	Not with shrimp or small fish		19 cm (7.5 in)
Flasher scorpionfish		Scorpaenopsis macrochir	Not with shrimp or small fish		13 cm (5.1 in)
Lacey scorpionfish		Rhinopias aphanes	Not with shrimp or small fish		24 cm (9.4 in)
Leaf scorpionfish		Taenianotus triacanthus	With Caution		10 cm (3.9 in)
Mozambique scorpionfish		Parascorpaena mossambica	Not with shrimp or small fish		10 cm (3.9 in)
Papuan scorpionfish		Scorpaenopsis papuensis	Not with shrimp or small fish		20 cm (7.9 in)
Poss's scorpionfish		Scorpaenopsis possi	Not with shrimp or small fish		19.3 cm (7.6 in)
Rogue scorpion		Amblyapistus taenianotus	With Caution		10 cm (3.9 in)
Sea goblin		Inimicus didactylus	Not with shrimp or small fish		18 cm (7.1 in)
Stone fish		Synanceja verrucosa	No	Highly venomous! Have caused human deaths	40 cm (15.7 in)
Weedy scorpionfish		Rhinopias frondosa	Not with shrimp or small fish		23 cm (9.1 in)
Yellowspotted scorpionfish		Sebastapistes cyanostigma	Not with shrimp or small fish		8 cm (3.1 in)

== Seahorses ==
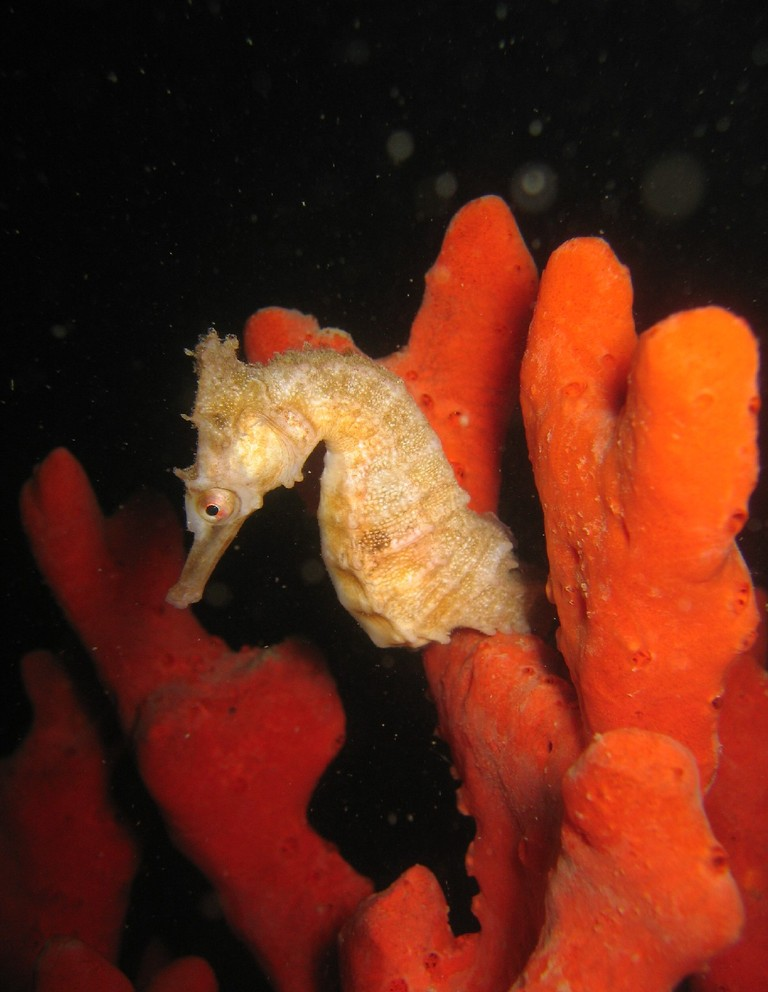
White's seahorse

It takes a special aquarist to maintain these delicate beauties. A potential keeper must be dedicated and willing to throw artistic creativity to the winds- as what seahorses need is not always beautiful. They require taller tanks, live/frozen food, and many hitching posts, as well as very peaceful tankmates. In fact, beginners would be well-advised not to mix seahorses with any other species until they have more experience. Good tank mates would include other peaceful, microfauna consuming species such as pipefish and dragonets.
Seahorses found in stores are generally Captive Bred, but occasionally one might find a wild caught (WC) specimen. WC Seahorses should only be purchased by seahorse experts who are going to breed them, as they tend to be finicky and most are endangered in the wild.
One of the advantages of Seahorses is that many species stay small and can (in fact, some should) be kept in smaller tanks, making them ideal for aquarists who are pressed for space or money.

Seahorses are among the few popular marine aquarium species that can be temperate. Species vary in their temperature requirement, so here an extra category has been added.
TR=Tropical ST=Sub-Tropical TM=Temperate

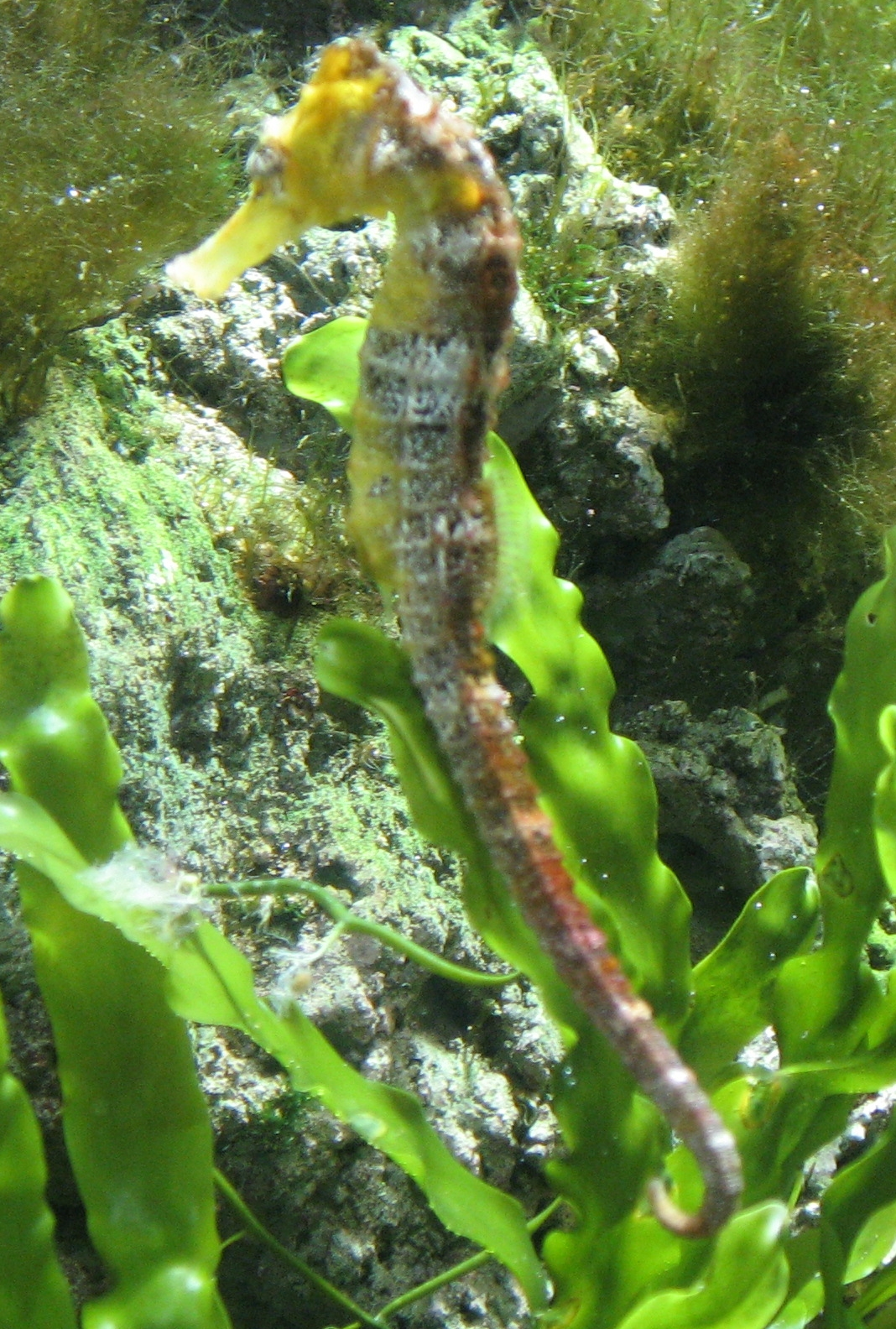
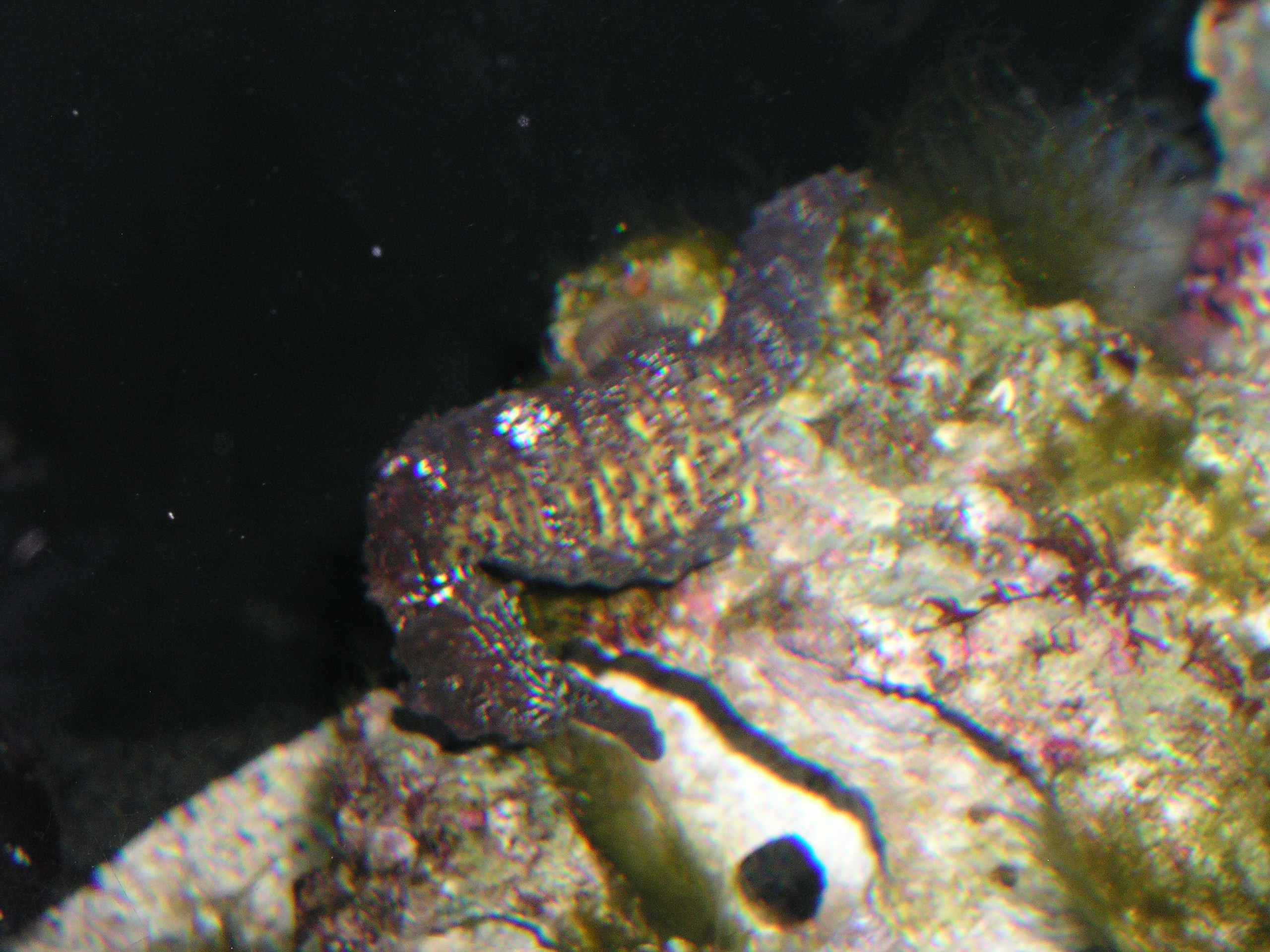
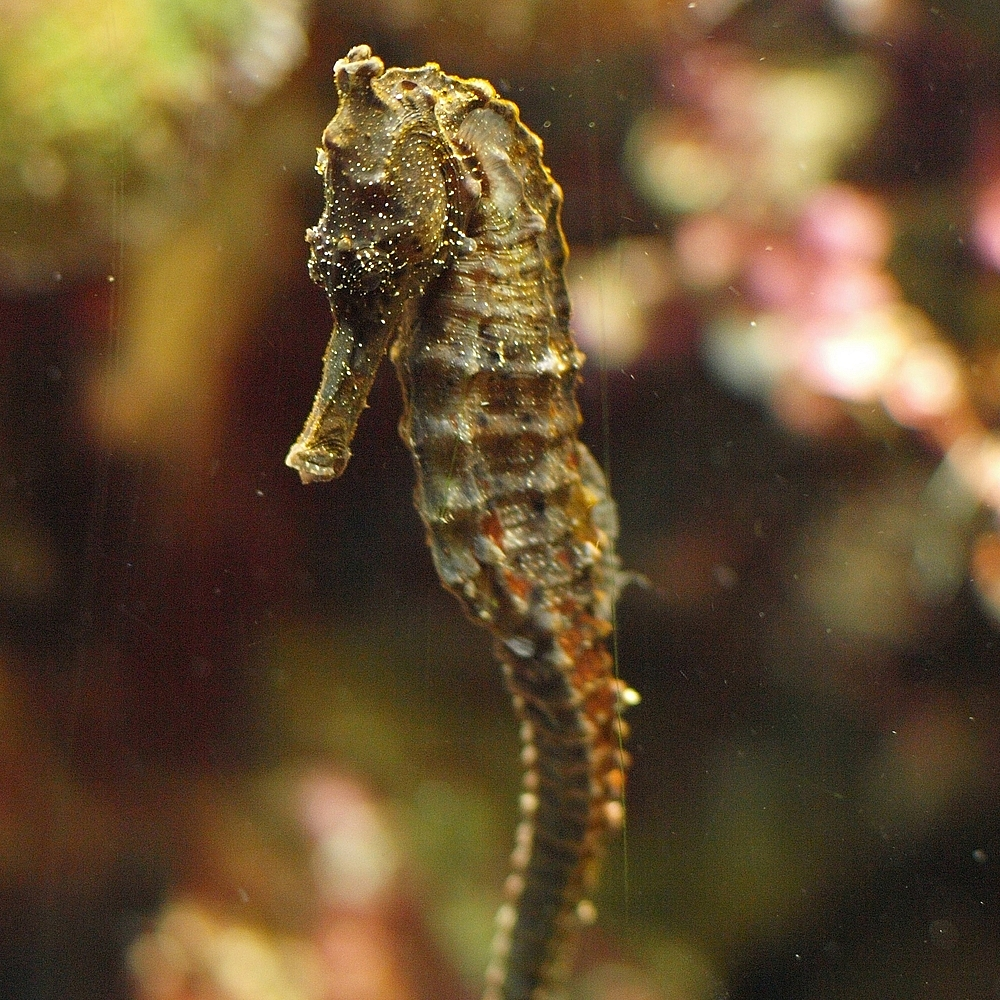
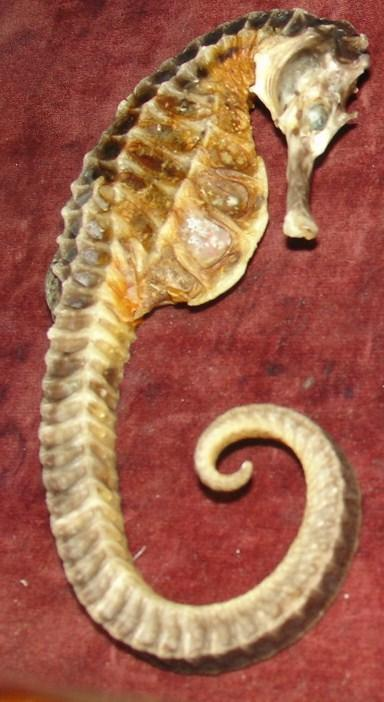
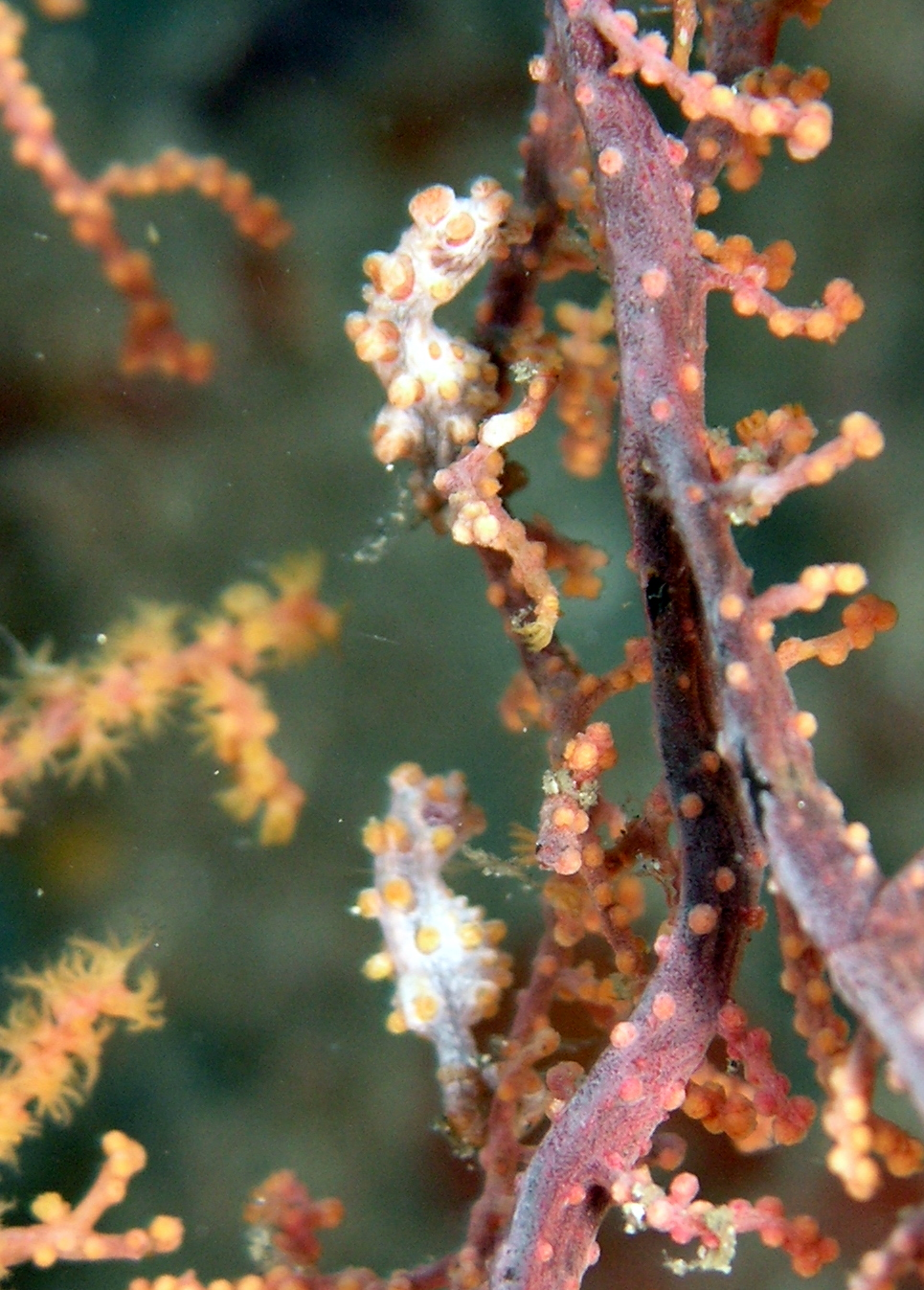
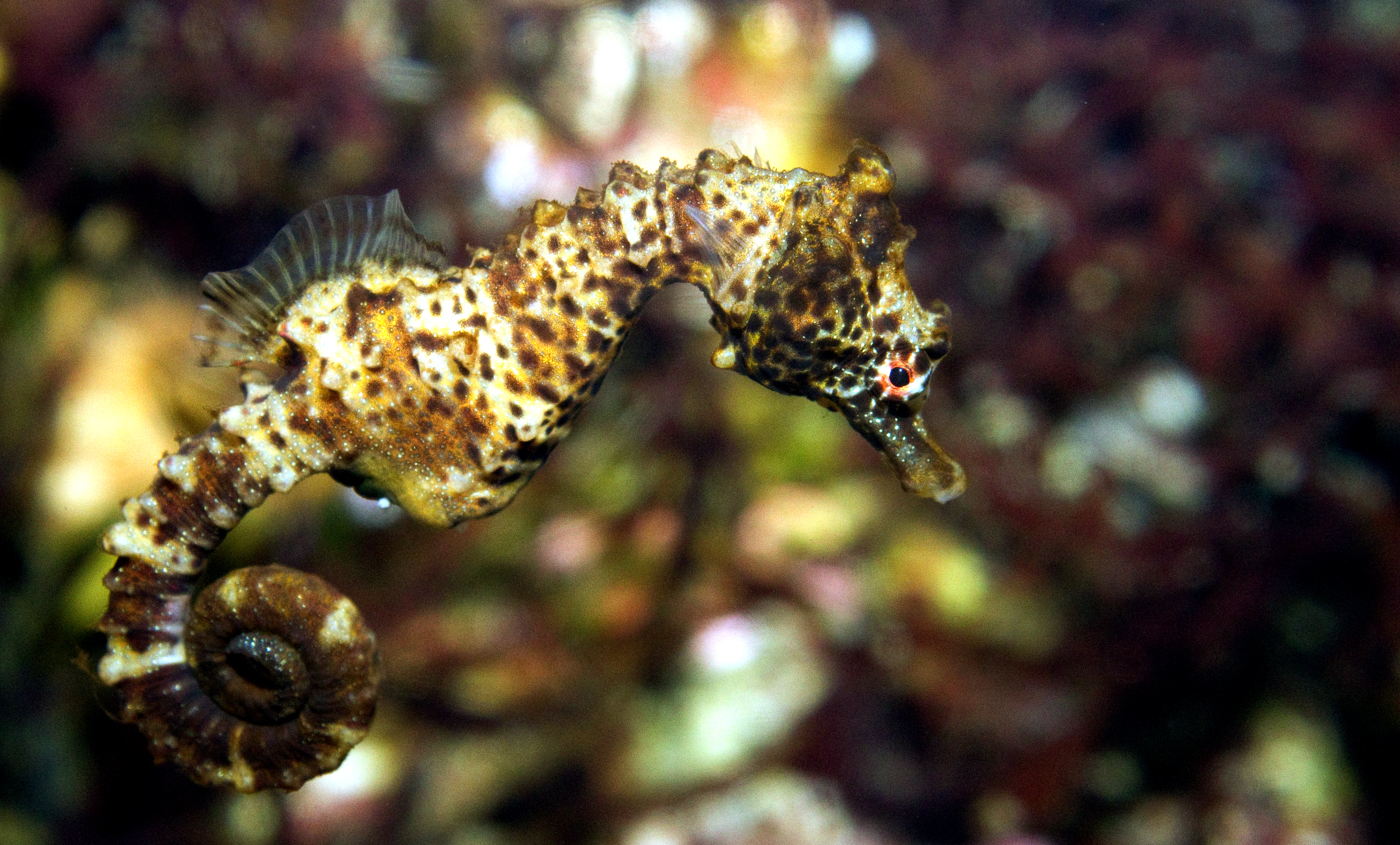
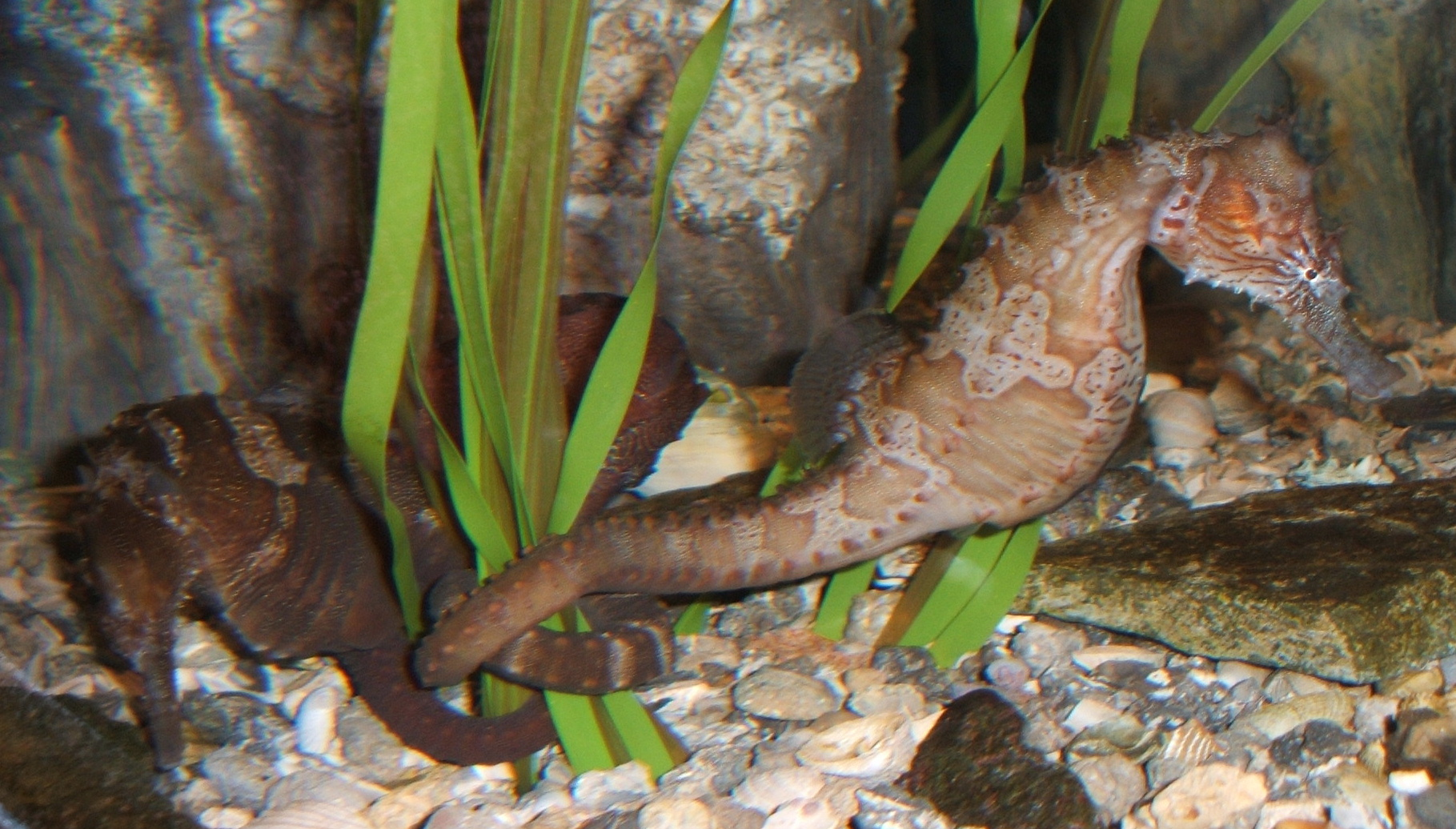
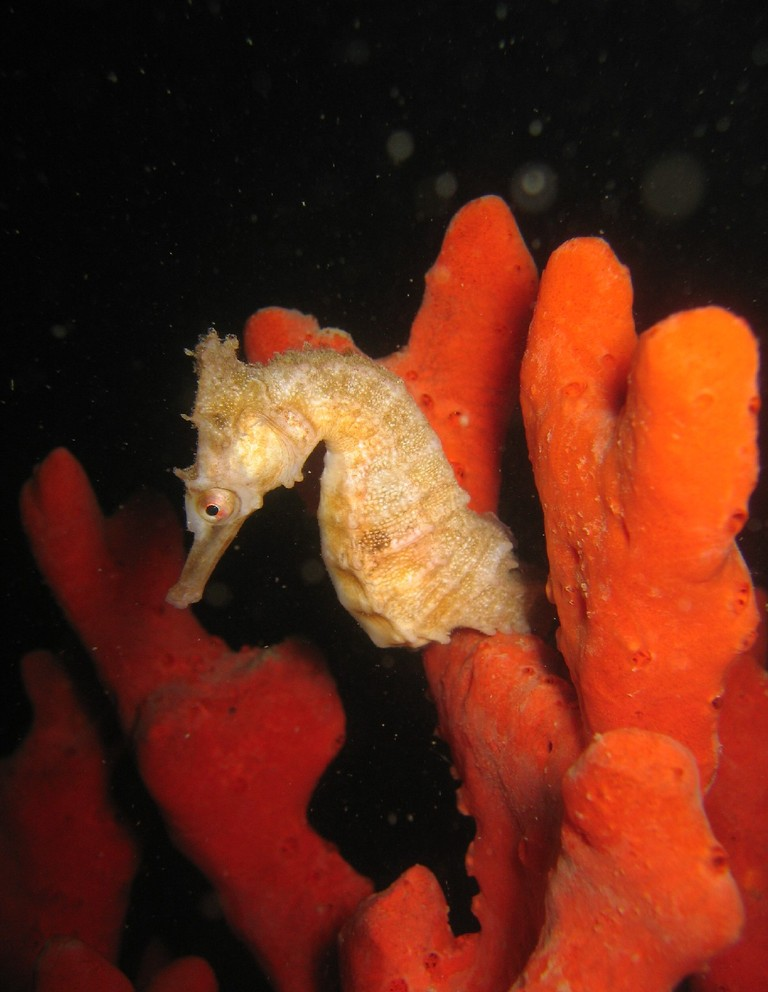
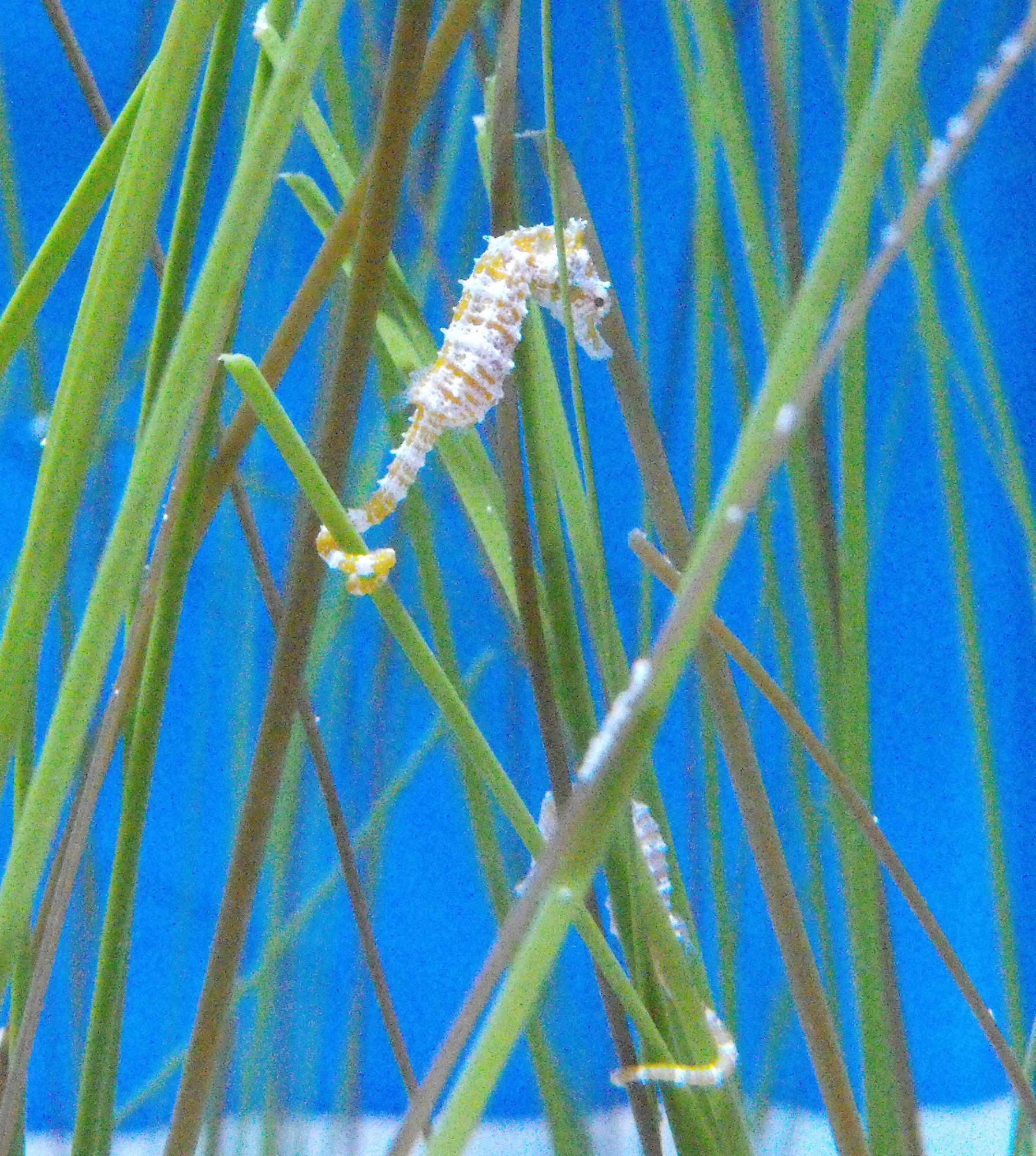
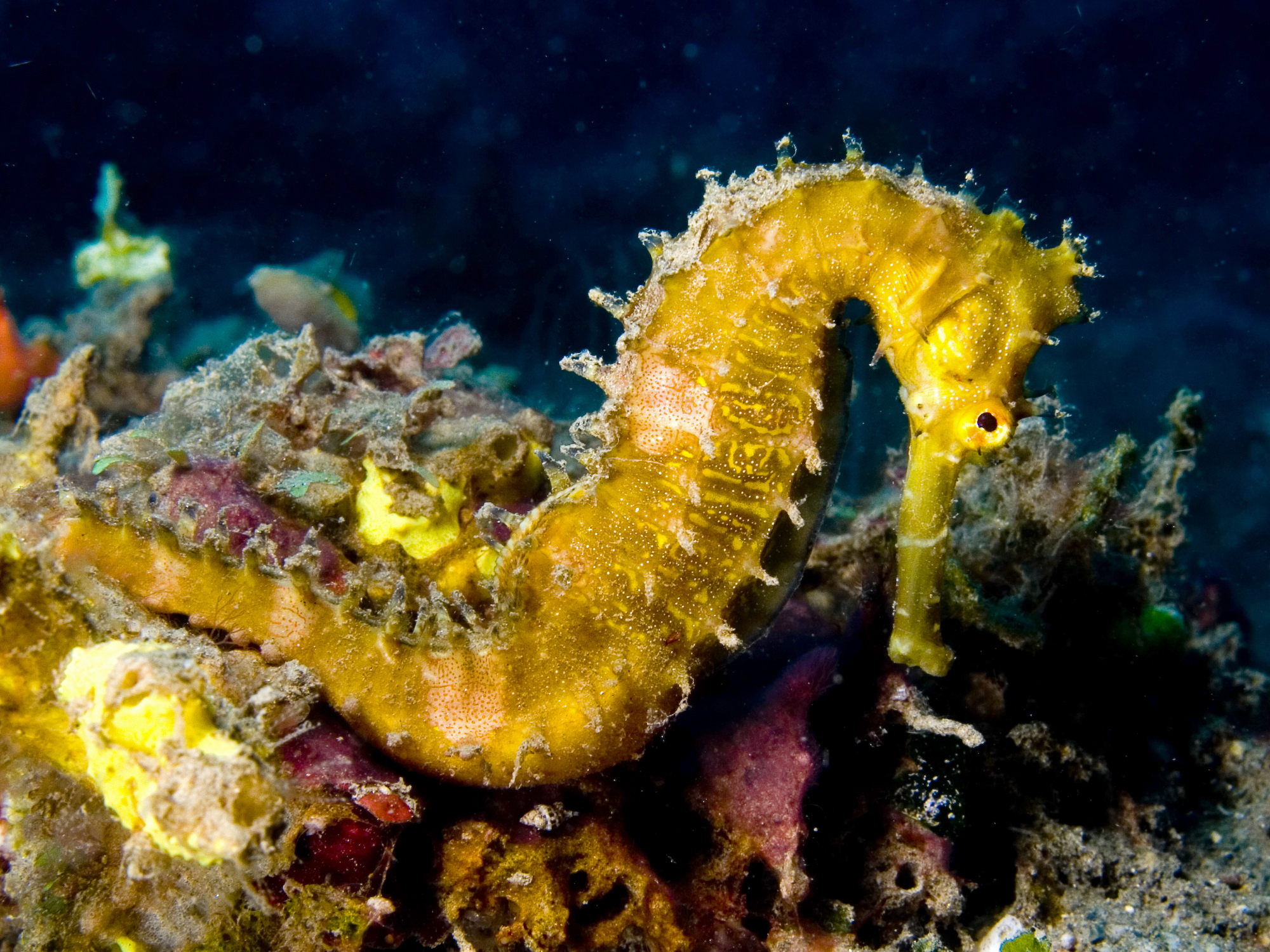
Common name	Image	Taxonomy	Reef safe	Temp.	Description	Max size
Brazilian seahorse		Hippocampus reidi	Caution	ST	Usually bright yellow, with a particularly long snout.	17 cm (6.7 in)
Spotted seahorse		Hippocampus kuda	Caution	TR	Generally yellow, but can also range from tan to dark black.	30 cm (11.8 in)
Great seahorse		Hippocampus kelloggi	Caution	ST	Light tan, with some darker specimens.	28 cm (11.0 in)
Pot-bellied seahorse		Hippocampus abdominalis	Caution	TM	Light-colored with dark spots and a large abdomen.	25 cm (9.8 in)
Pygmy seahorse		Hippocampus bargibanti	Caution	TR	White with pink (occasionally yellow) knobby protrusions.	2.4 cm (0.9 in)
Short-snouted seahorse		Hippocampus breviceps	Caution	TM	Grayish to tan with short snout and a spiny head.	15 cm (5.9 in)
Tiger tail seahorse		Hippocampus comes	Caution	TR	Varying colors with dark striped tail.	18 cm (7.1 in)
Lined Seahorse		Hippocampus erectus	Caution	ST	Dark colored with lighter belly and white ridges.	19 cm (7.5 in)
White's Seahorse		Hippocampus whitei	Caution	TM	Fuller bodied with a comparatively larger head.	13 cm (5.1 in)
Dwarf Seahorse		Hippocampus zosterae	Caution	ST	Similar to H. reidi but much smaller.	5 cm (2.0 in)
Thorny Seahorse		Hippocampus histrix	Caution	TR	Varying colors with distinctive spines all over body.	17 cm (6.7 in)

== Squirrelfish ==
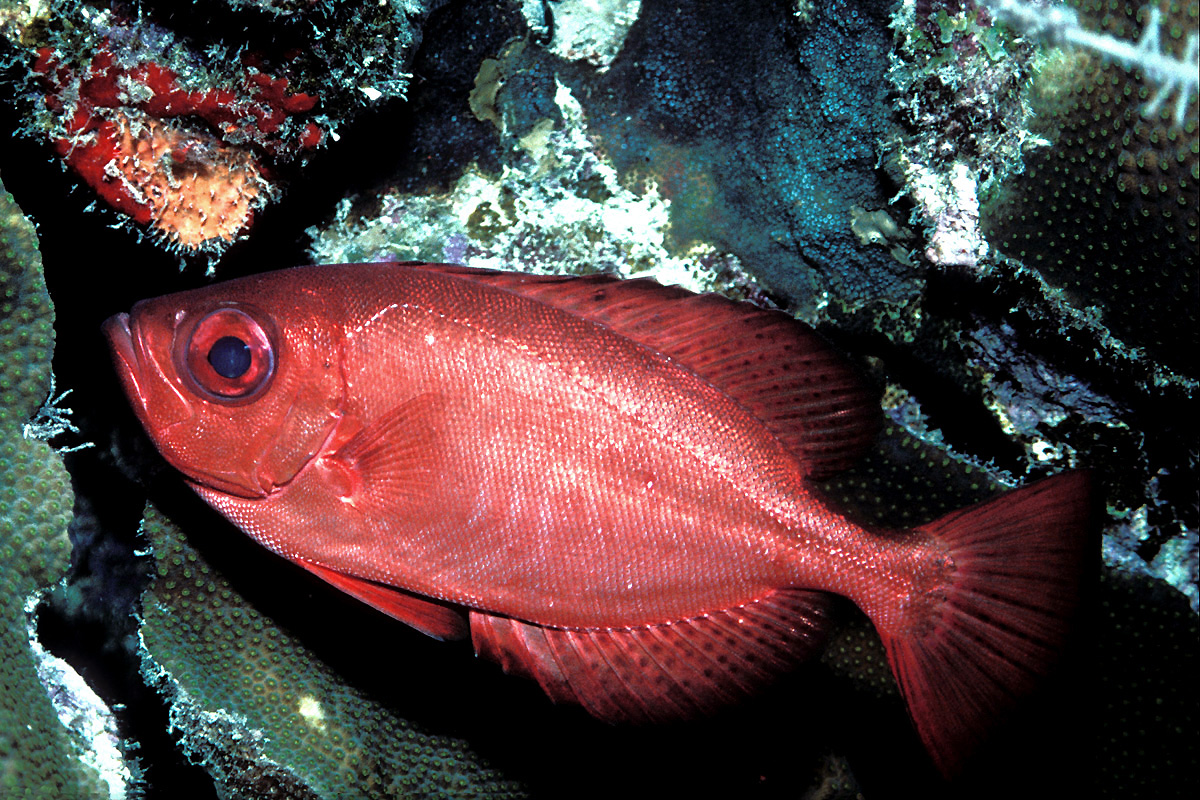
Glass eye squirrelfish

Typically are hardy fish that can be kept with a wide variety of tankmates.

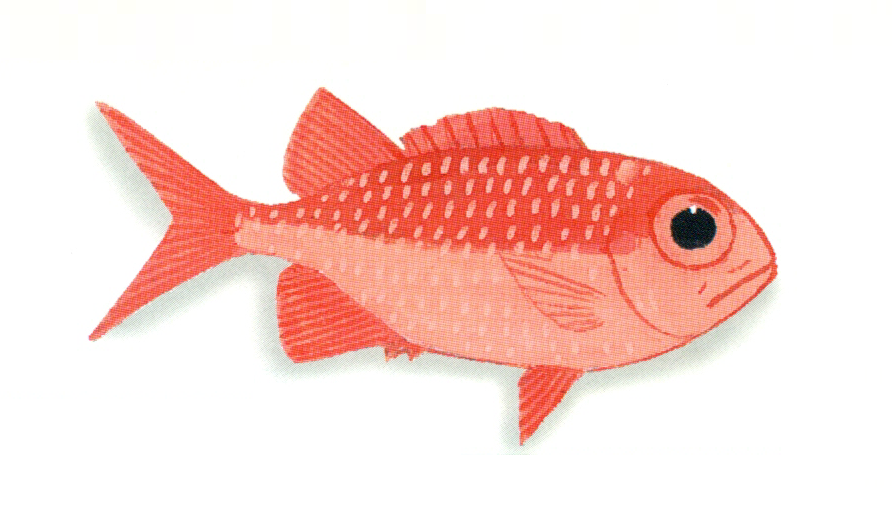
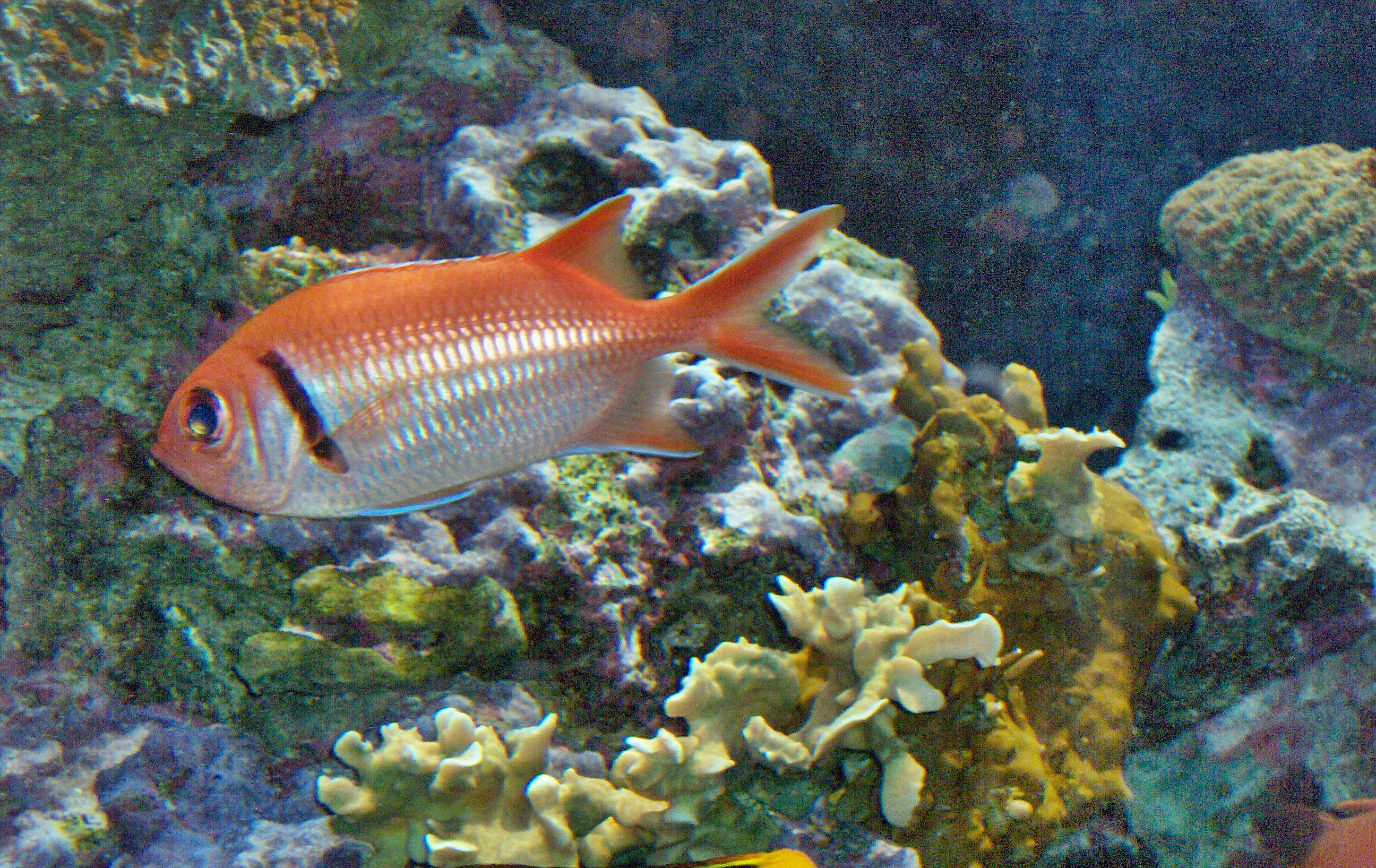
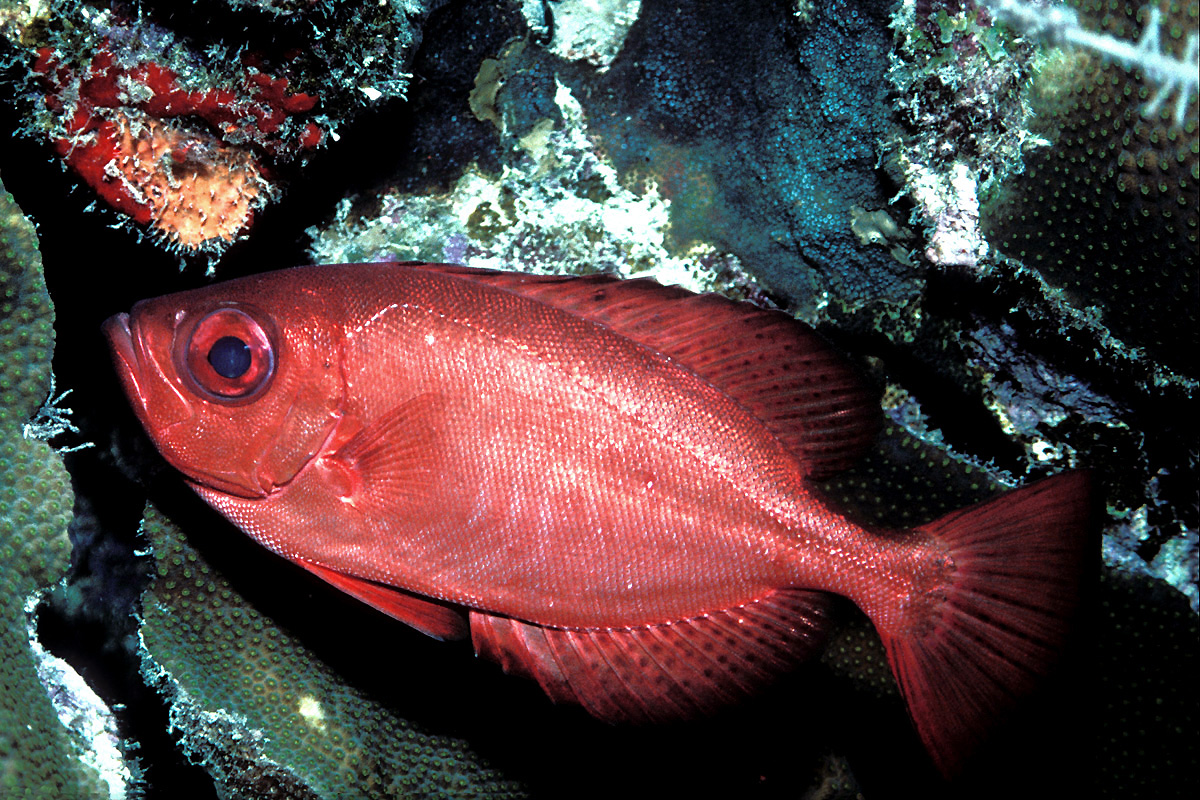
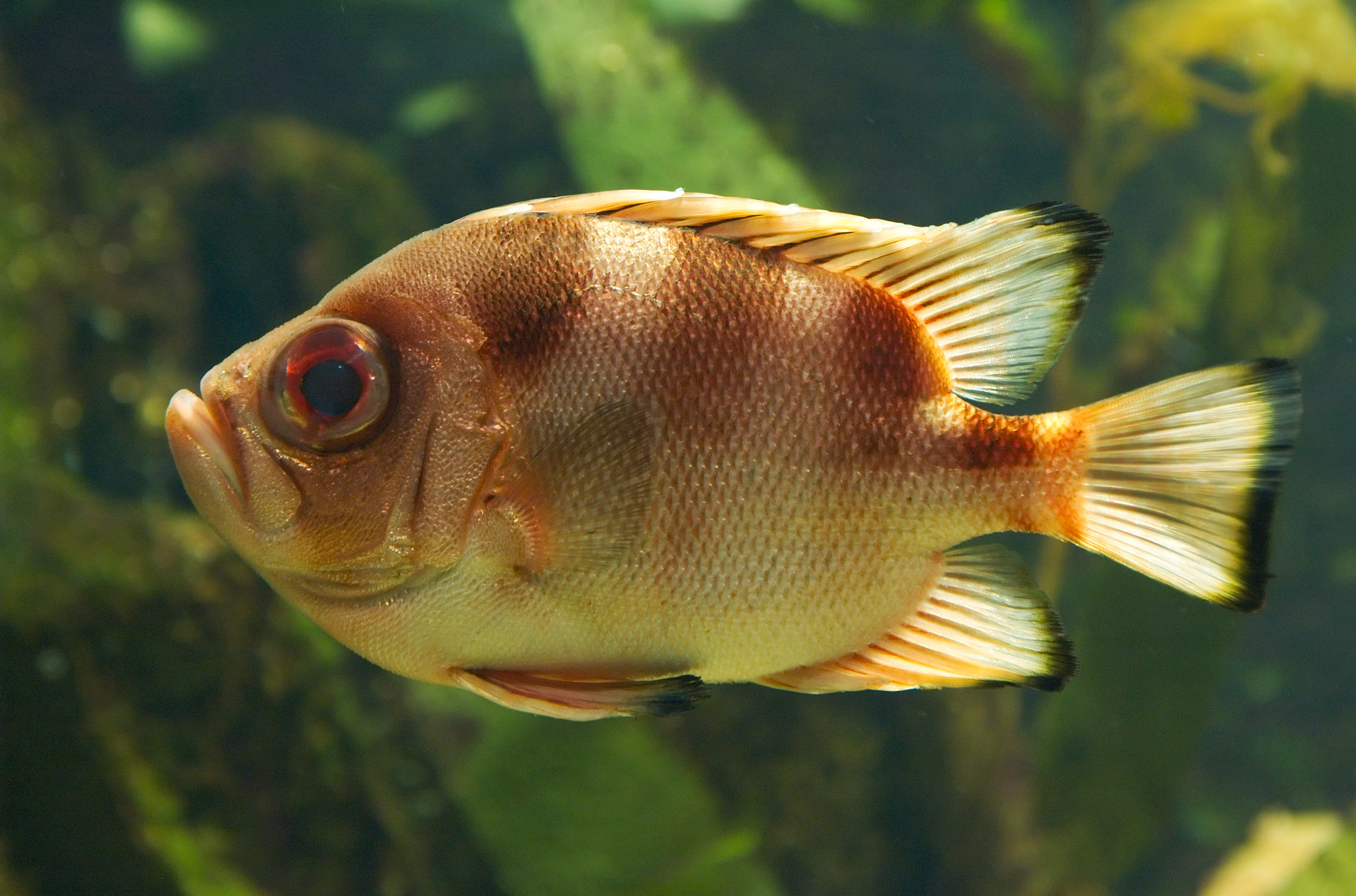
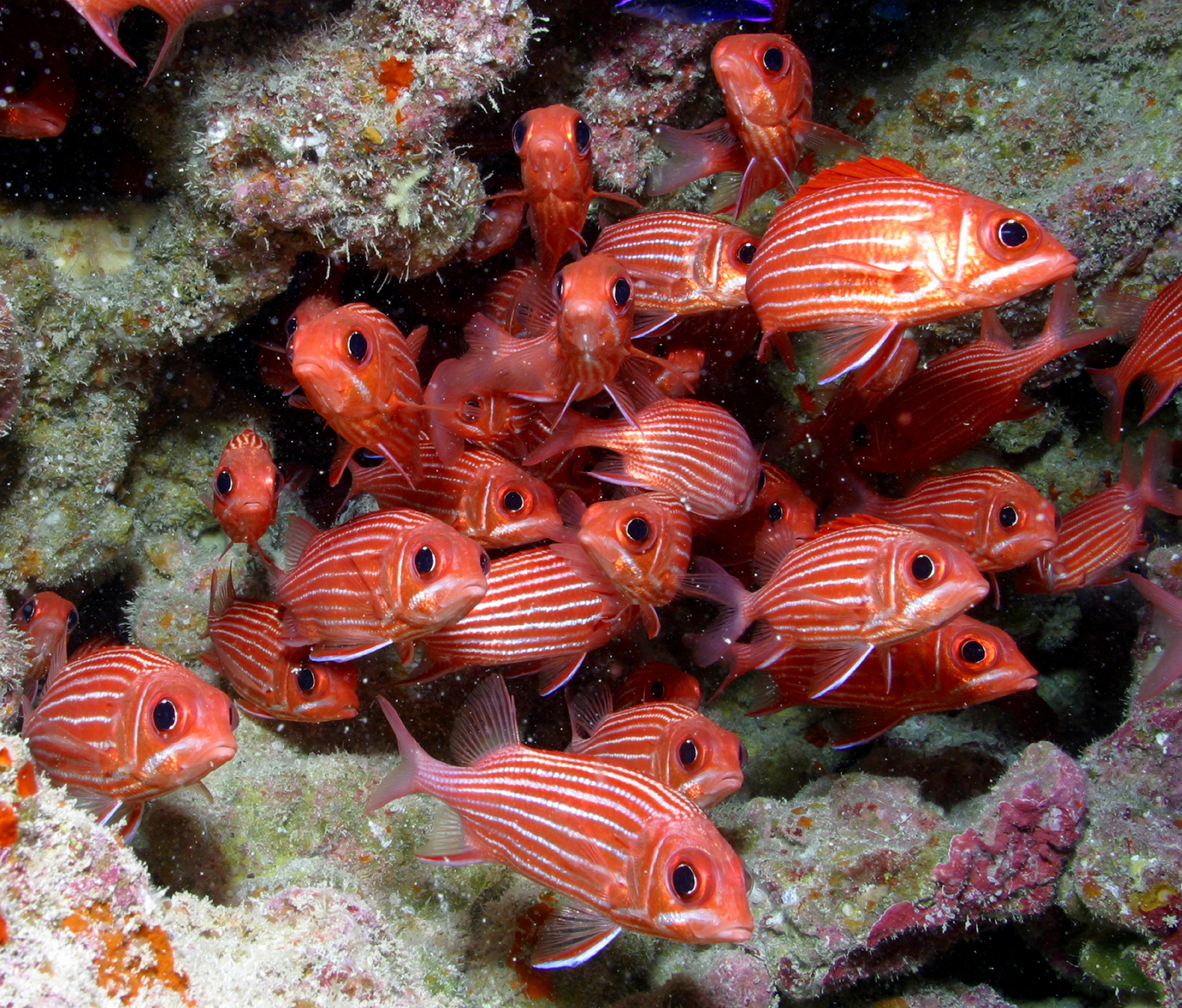
Common name	Image	Taxonomy	Reef safe	Description	Max size
Big eye soldierfish		Myripristis vittata	With Caution		25 cm (9.8 in)
Blackbar soldierfish		Myripristis jacobus	With Caution		25 cm (9.8 in)
Glass eye squirrelfish		Heteropriacanthus cruentatus	With Caution		30 cm (11.8 in)
Popeye catalufa soldierfish		Pristigenys serrula	With Caution		34 cm (13.4 in)
Scarlet squirrelfish		Sargocentron tiere	With Caution		33 cm (13.0 in)
Striped squirrelfish		Sargocentron xantherythrum	With Caution		18 cm (7.1 in)

== Sharks ==
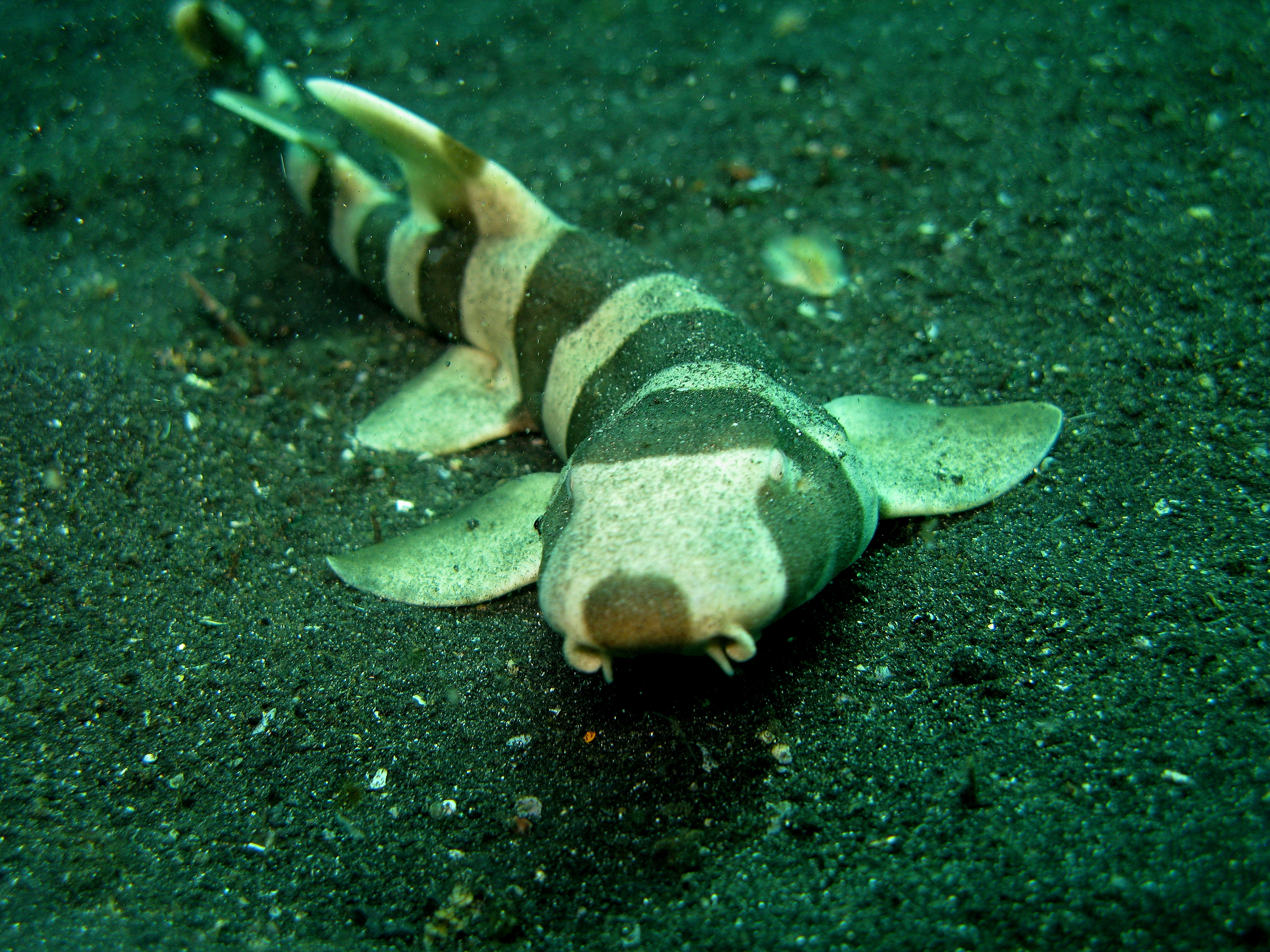
Juvenile Brownbanded bamboo shark

Many sharks will outgrow most home aquariums and/or adapt poorly to captivity. However, numerous coastal and coral reef sharks do well in good aquarium surroundings although you should have experience in keeping other saltwater fish before trying to keep sharks as they are more difficult to care for. In a shark aquarium setup (preferably an oval-shaped tank for more active species), there should be much surface area (wide and long tanks with good gas exchange/more room for biological filtration and room for sharks to swim, glide, and turn with little constraint opposed to tall, thin tanks), fine substrate (coarse substrate can irritate the shark's underside), little décor and rockwork (which should be secure) for swimming space (sharks in the orders Orectolobiformes and Heterodontiformes however, feel more secure in tanks with caves and ledges), excellent filtration (sharks are messy eaters and need good water conditions), protected heaters, filter intakes, etc. by surrounding them in polyurethane foam barriers (unprotected equipment can be dangerous to active sharks), and a secure canopy (sharks can jump out of the water) as well as, strong, steady, linear water flow (10+ x the volume of the aquarium per hour) moving in a gyre circling the aquarium, dissolved oxygen levels of 7–8ppm (slightly more if you are using ozone), low light levels, and no stray electrical currents/amounts of metal in the aquarium water. Many sharks feed on invertebrates to a great degree along with fish (even ones that are larger than themselves), and although they don't eat coral, they can knock them over and rest on them. There are also many fish and invertebrates that can harm/irritate sharks such as scorpionfish, butterflyfish, angelfish (large), filefish, triggerfish, pufferfish, suckerfish (over time), porcupinefish, certain other sharks, large crabs, hermit crabs, sea anemones, and stinging corals. Also, sharks need iodine which can be provided through regular water changes or supplements for sharks (iodine deficiencies and possibly the buildup of nitrates can result in goiter), and feeding frequency is species-specific. Copper treatments should not be administered to most shark species.

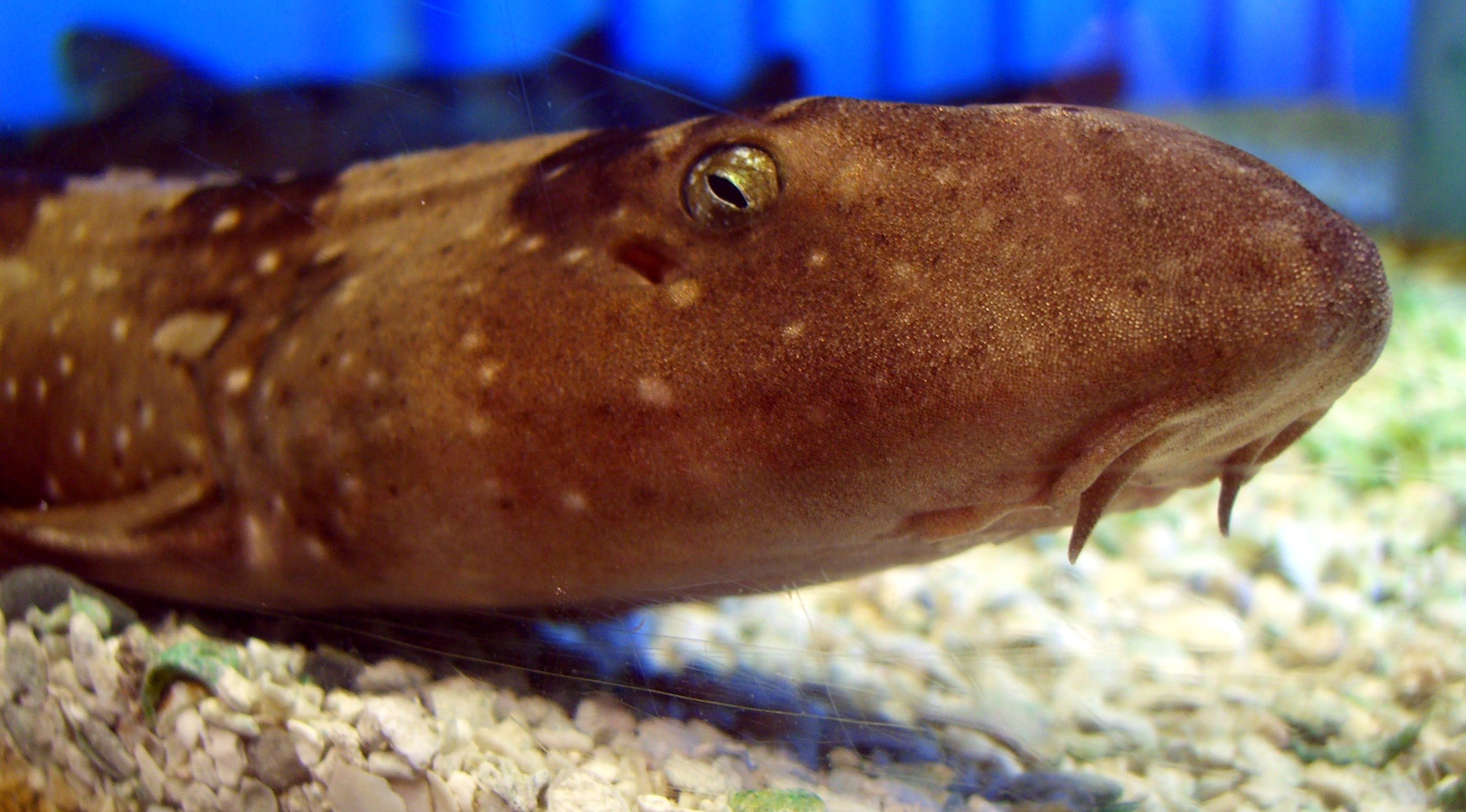
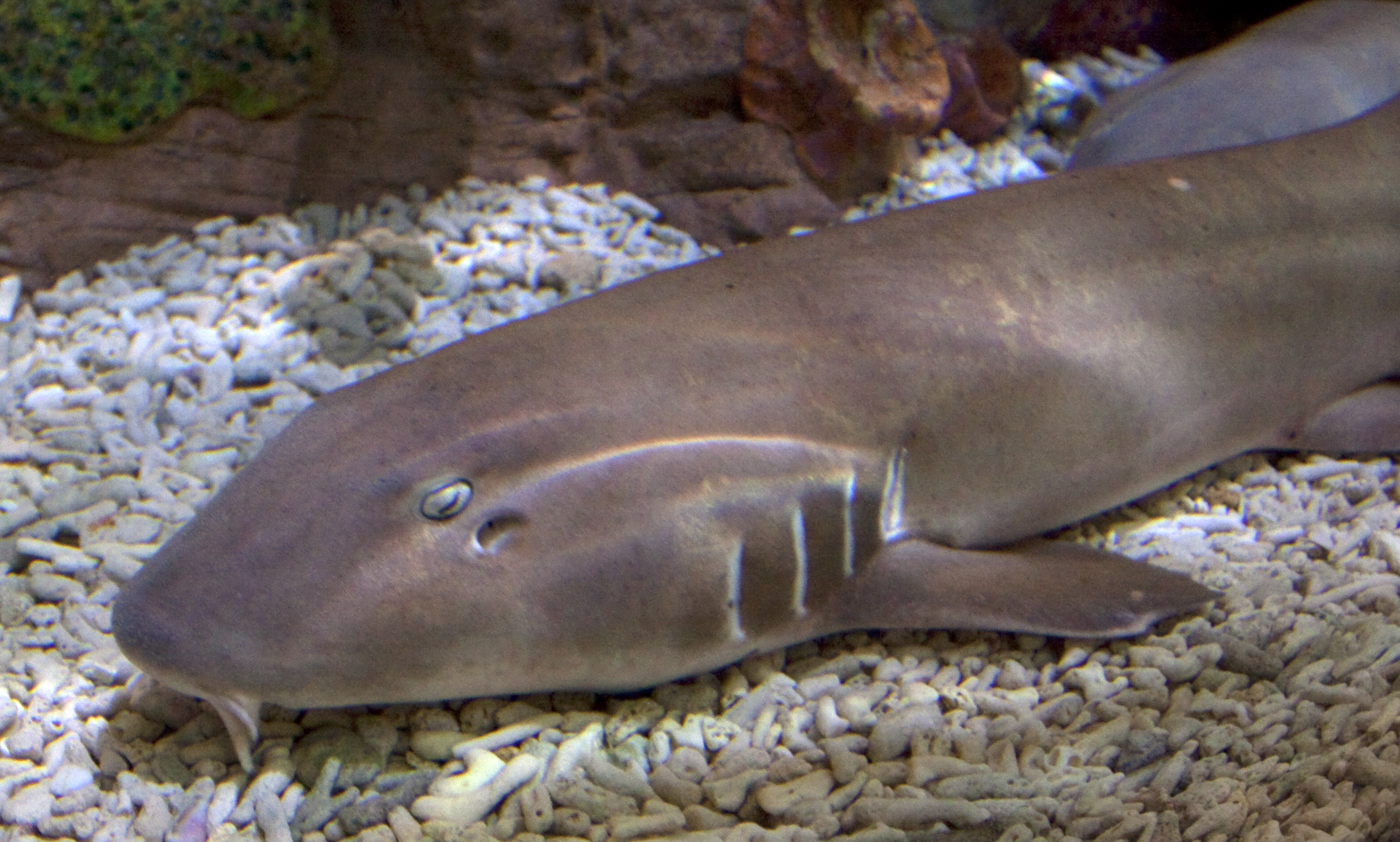
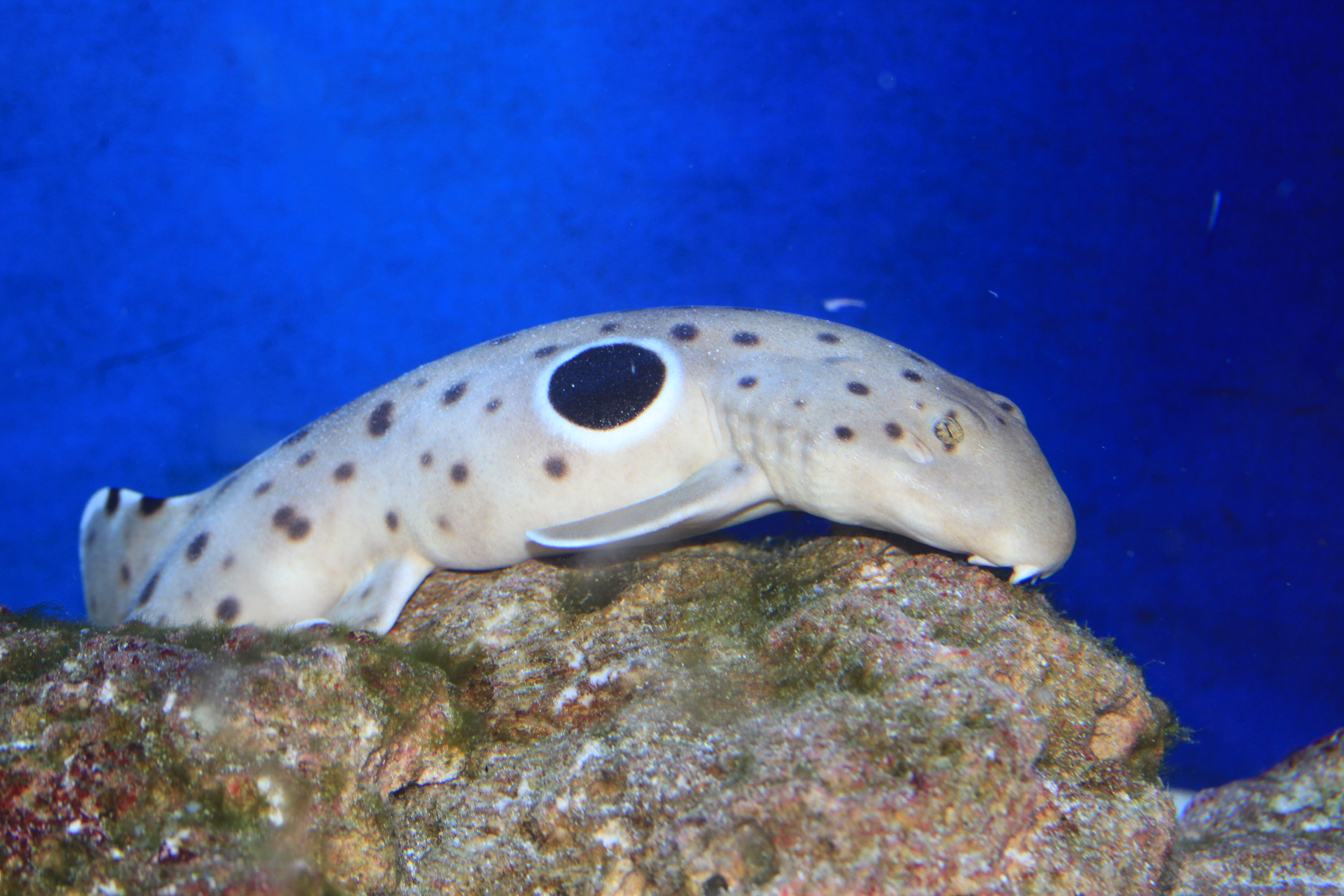
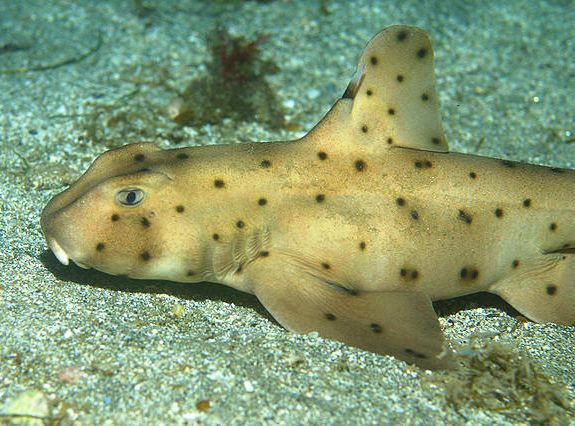
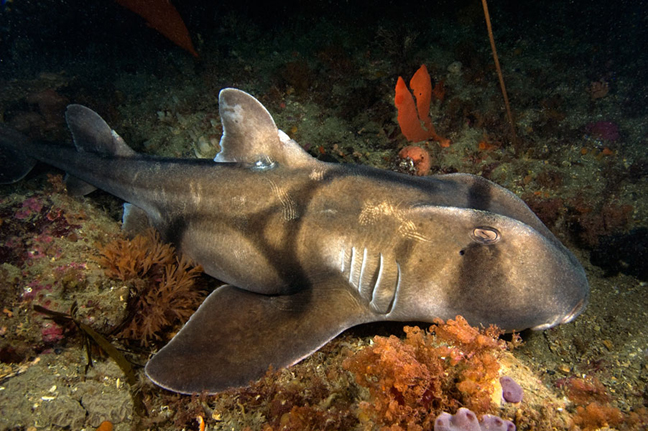
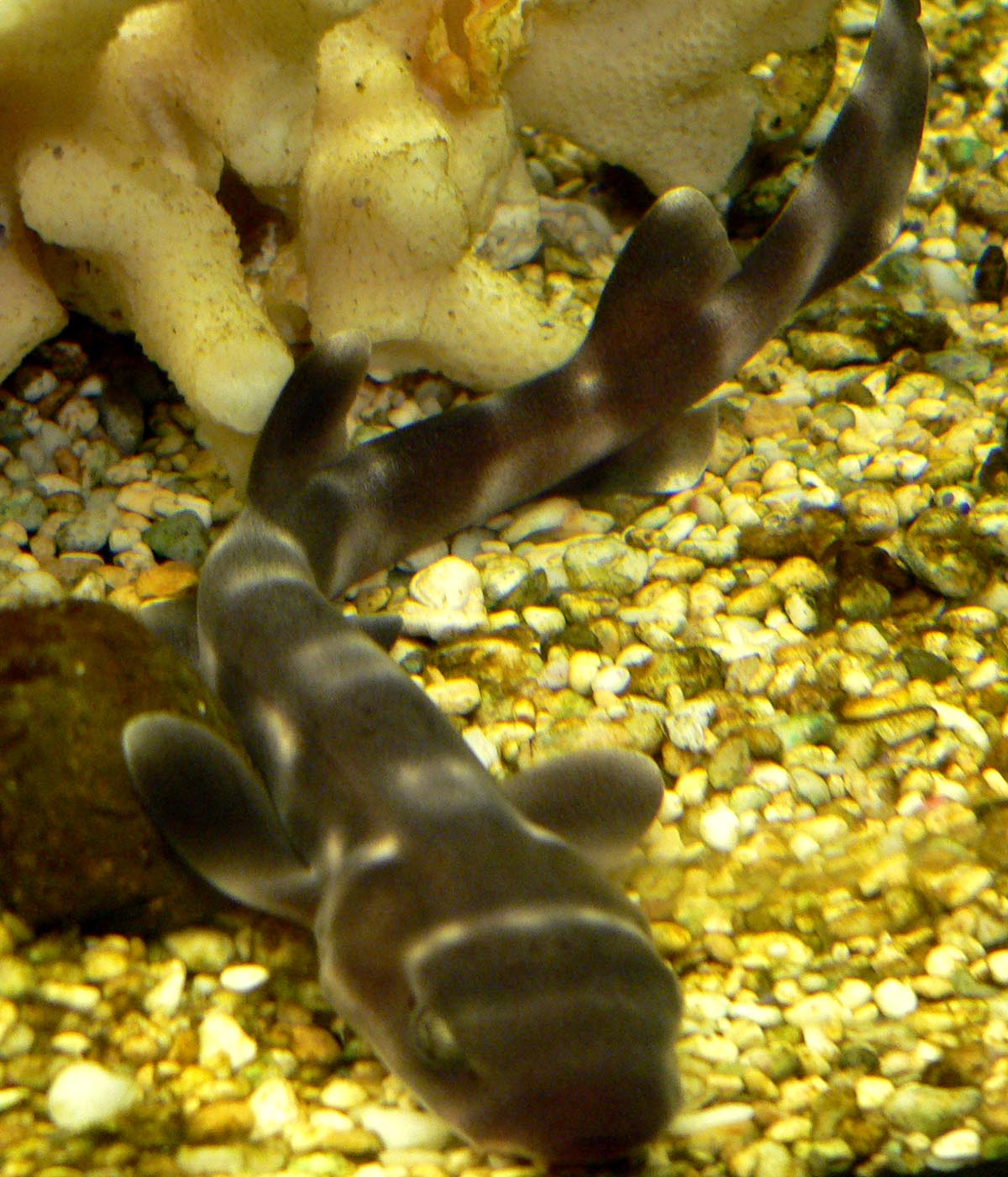
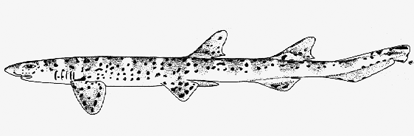
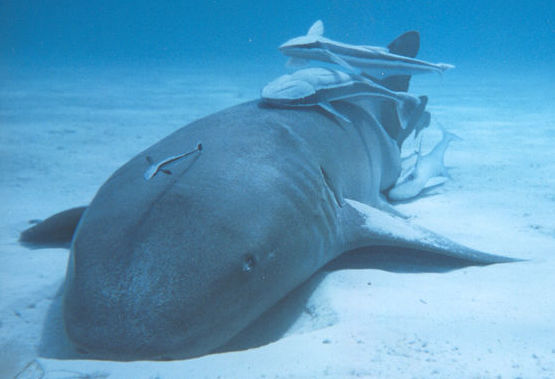
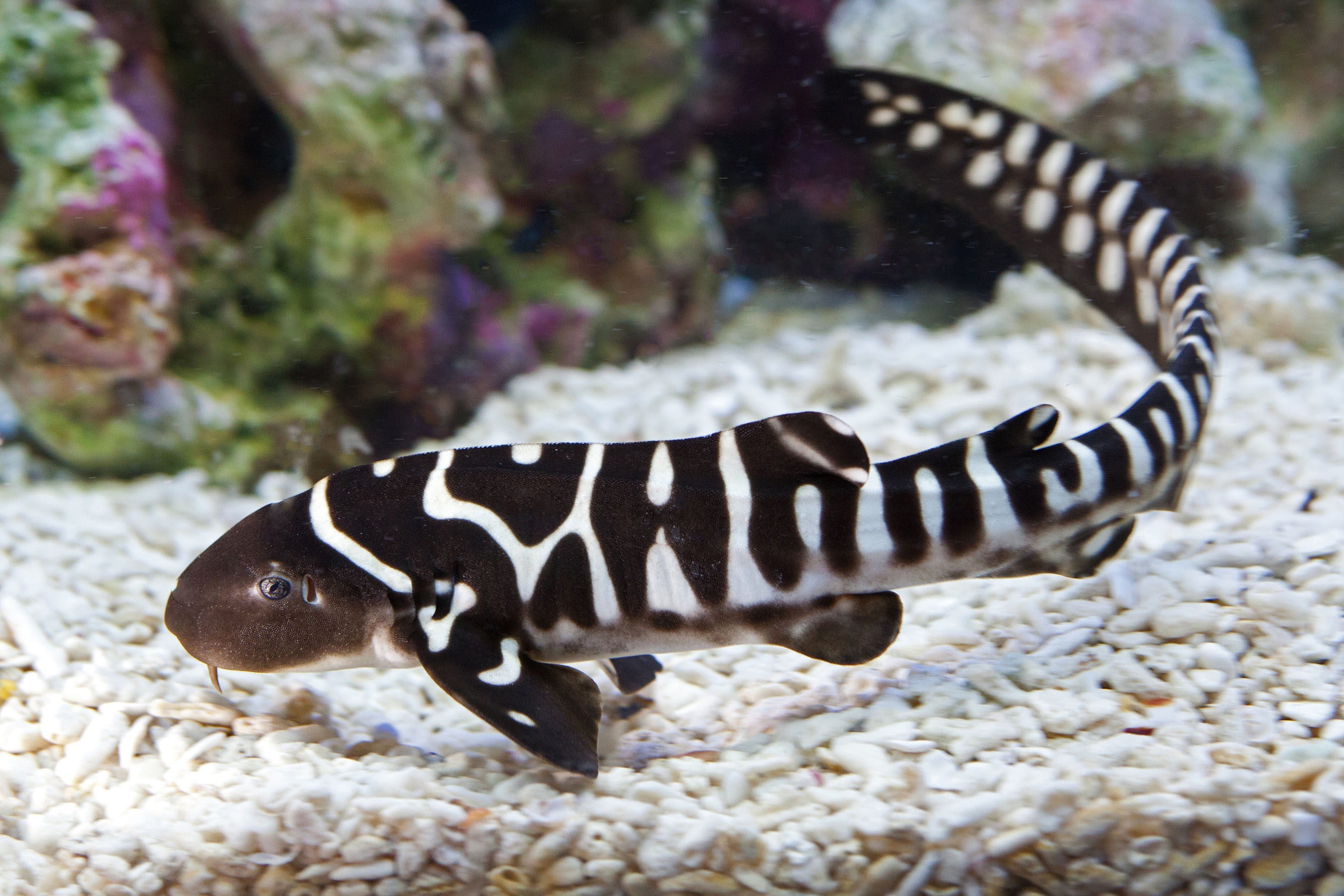
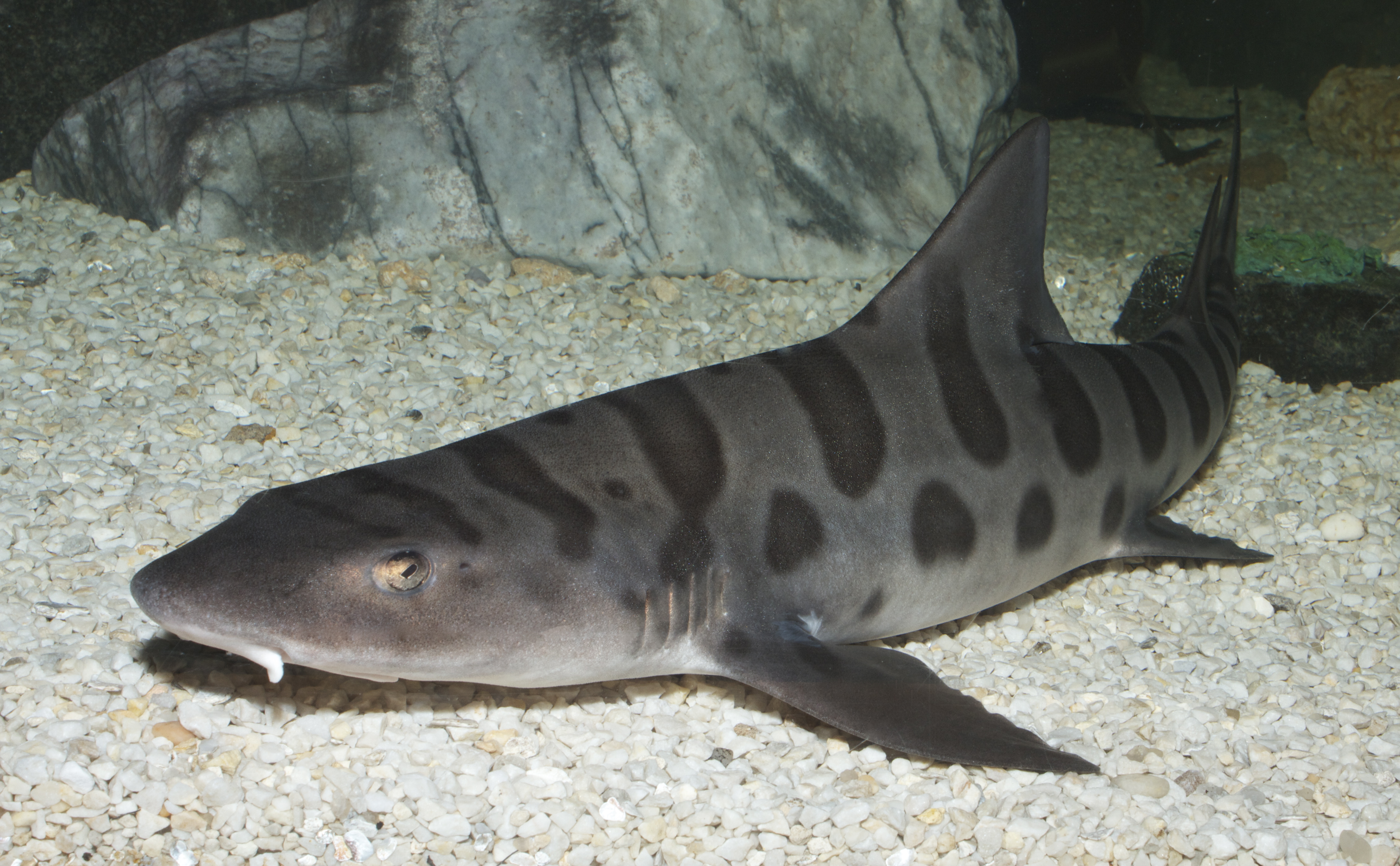
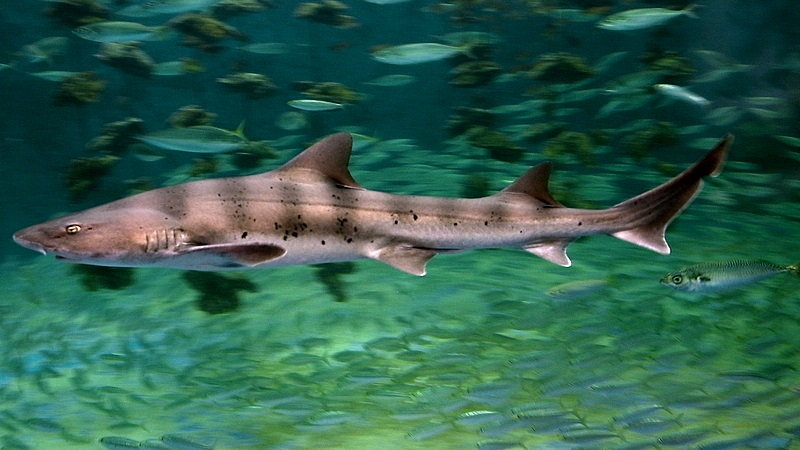
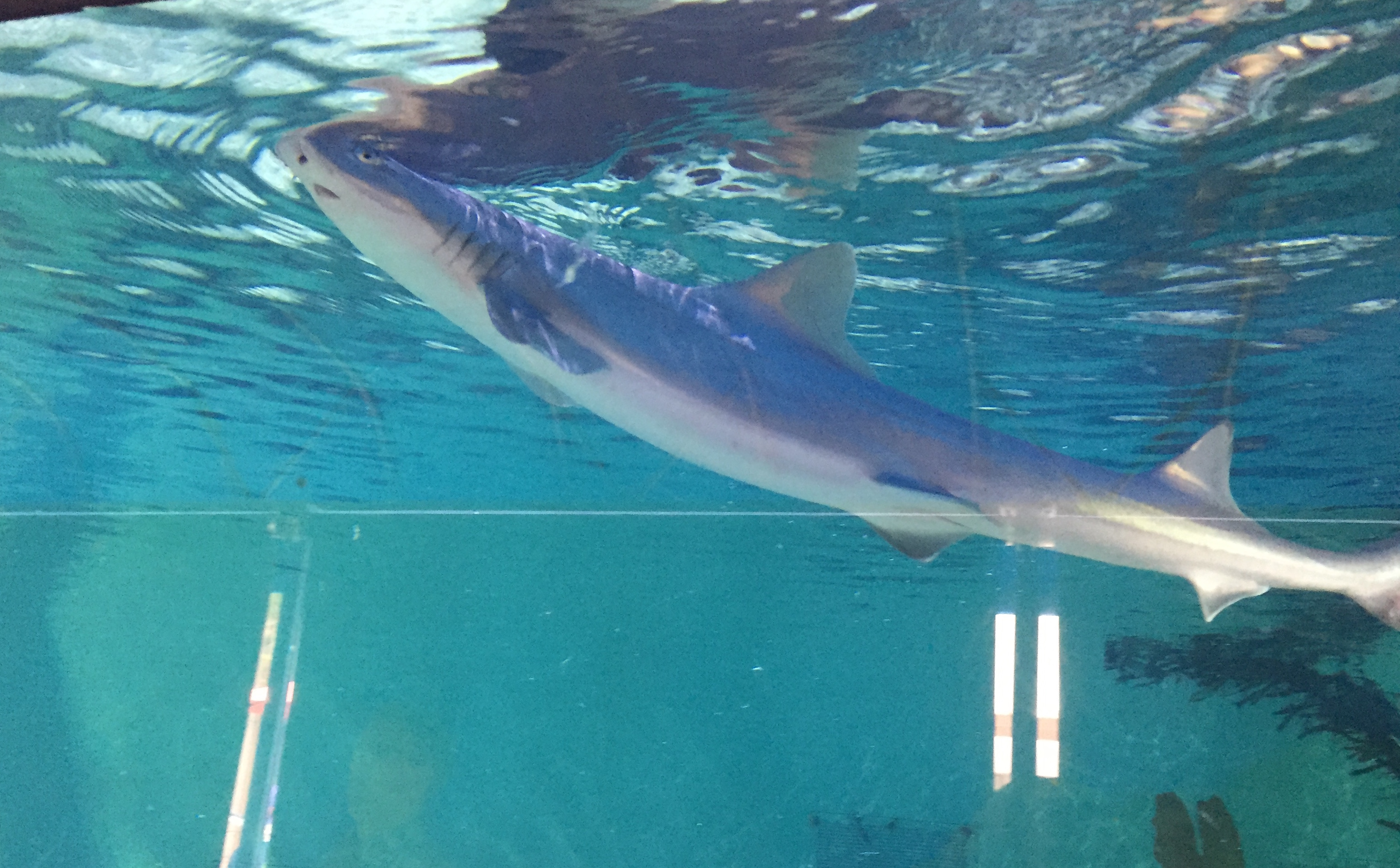
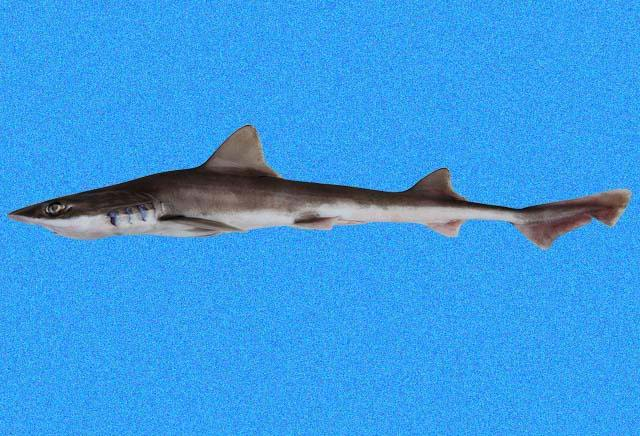
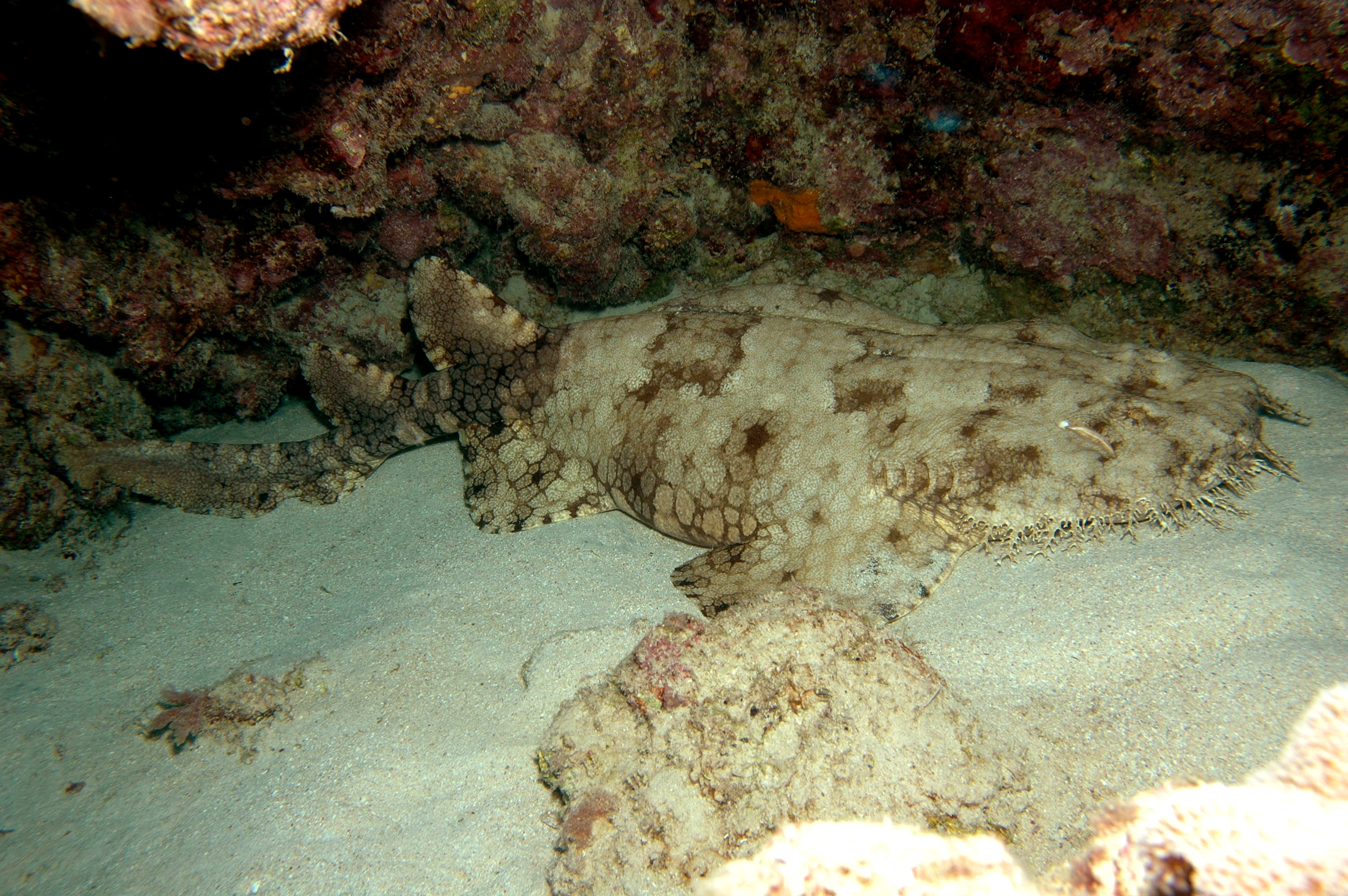
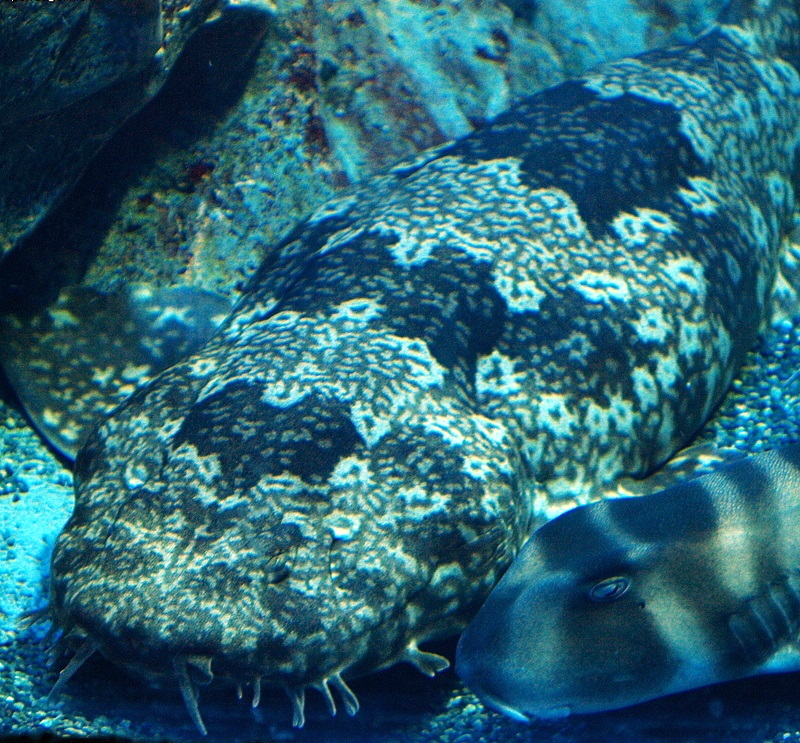
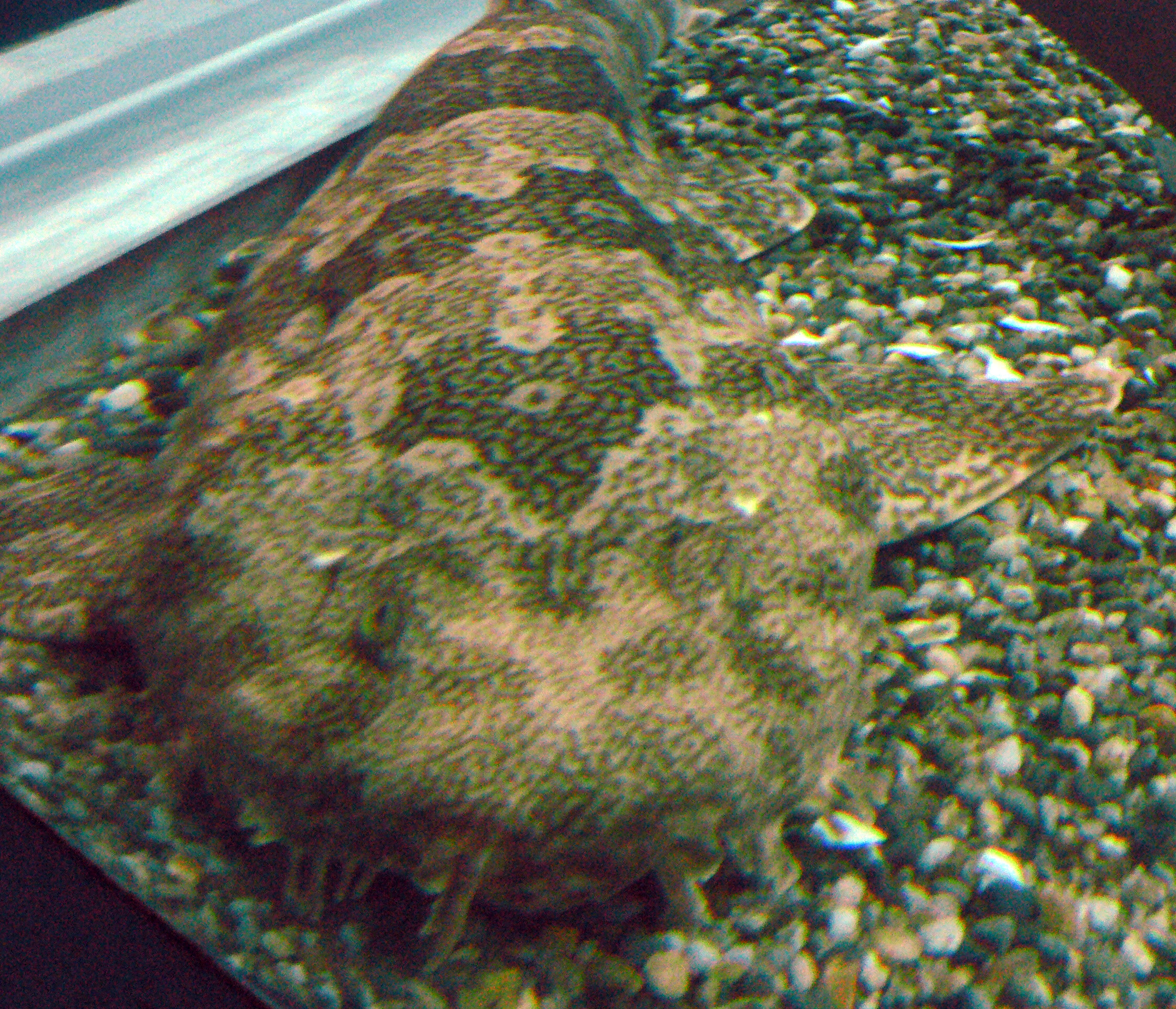
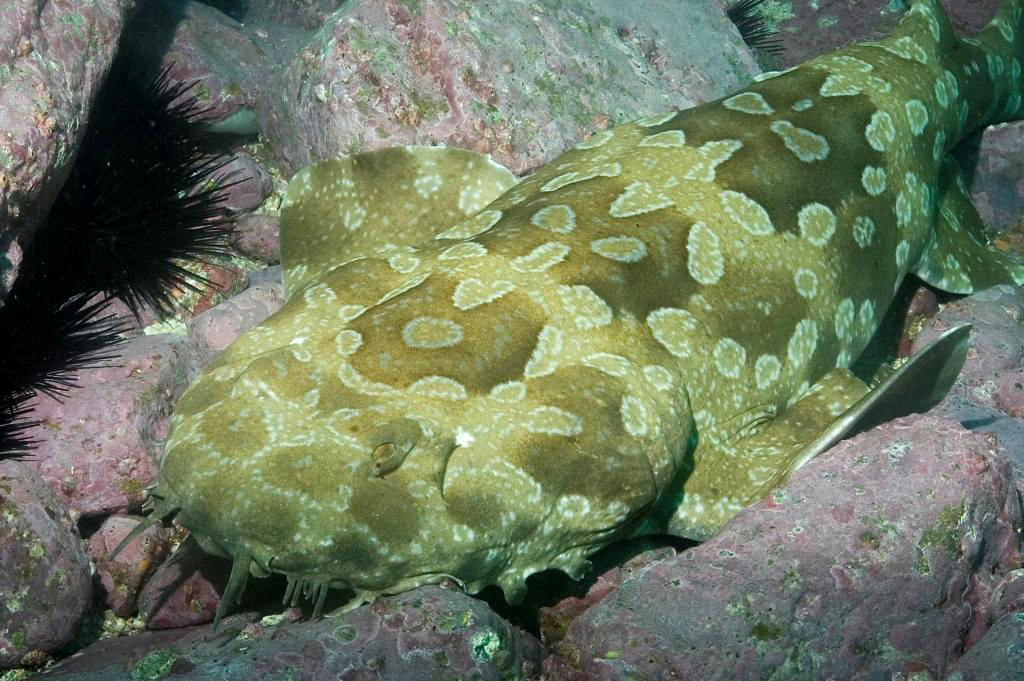
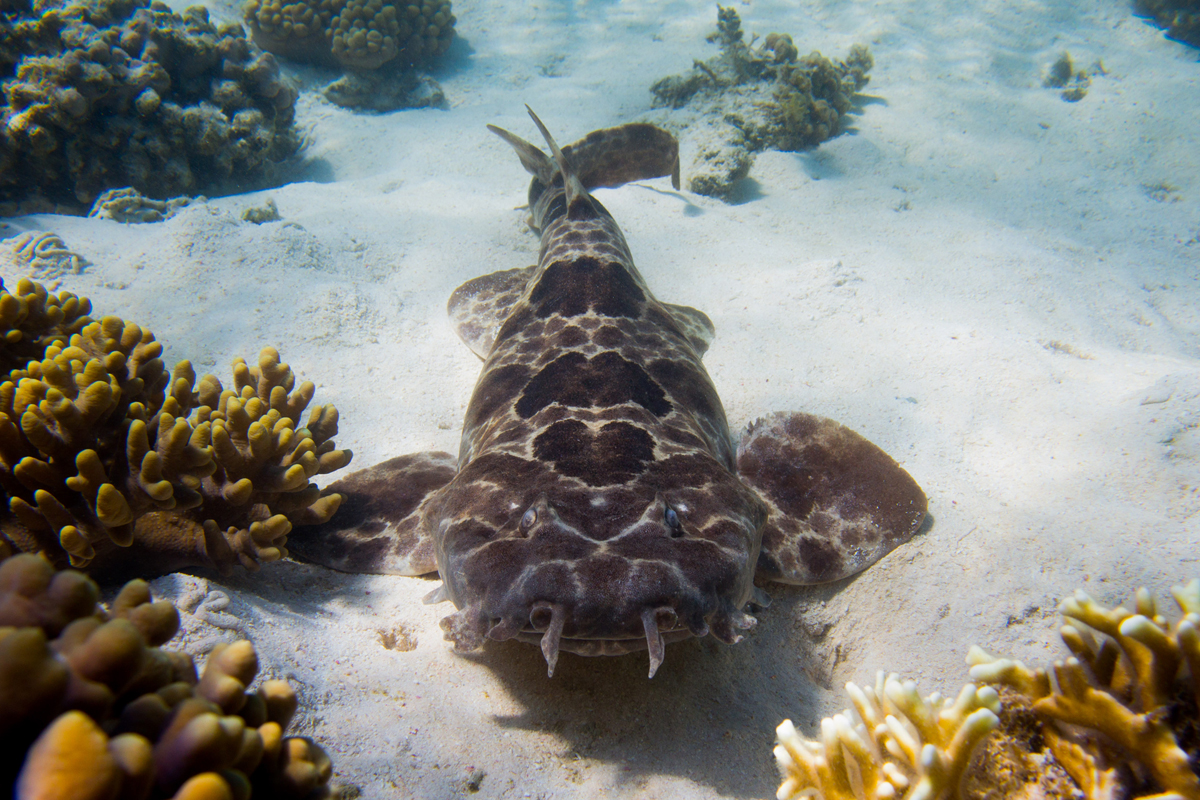
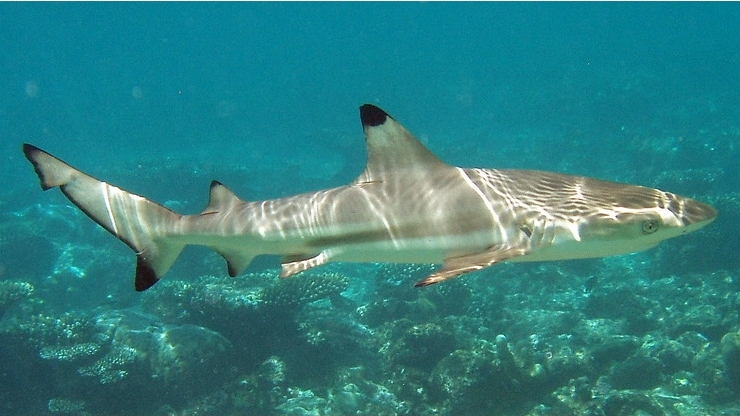
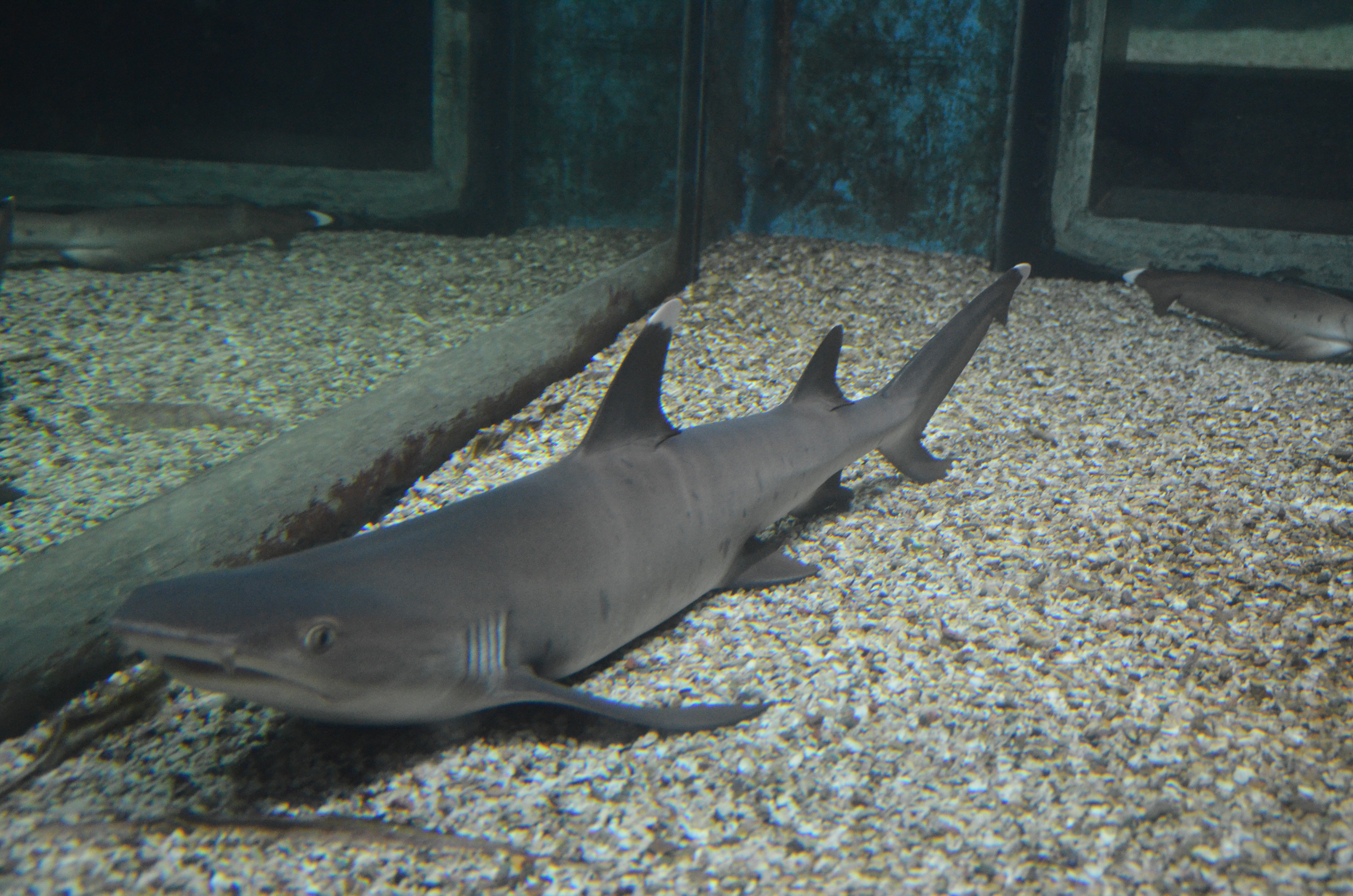
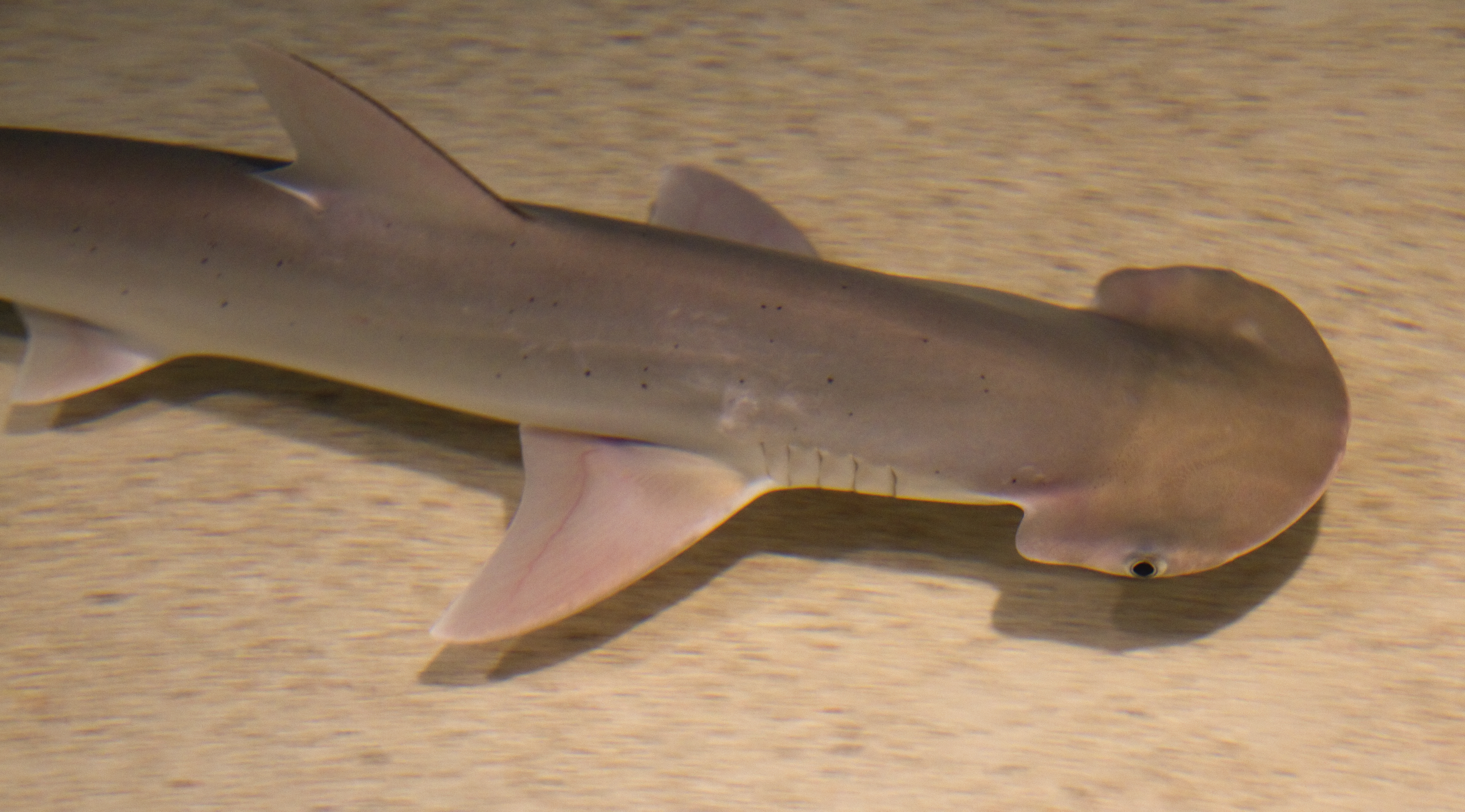
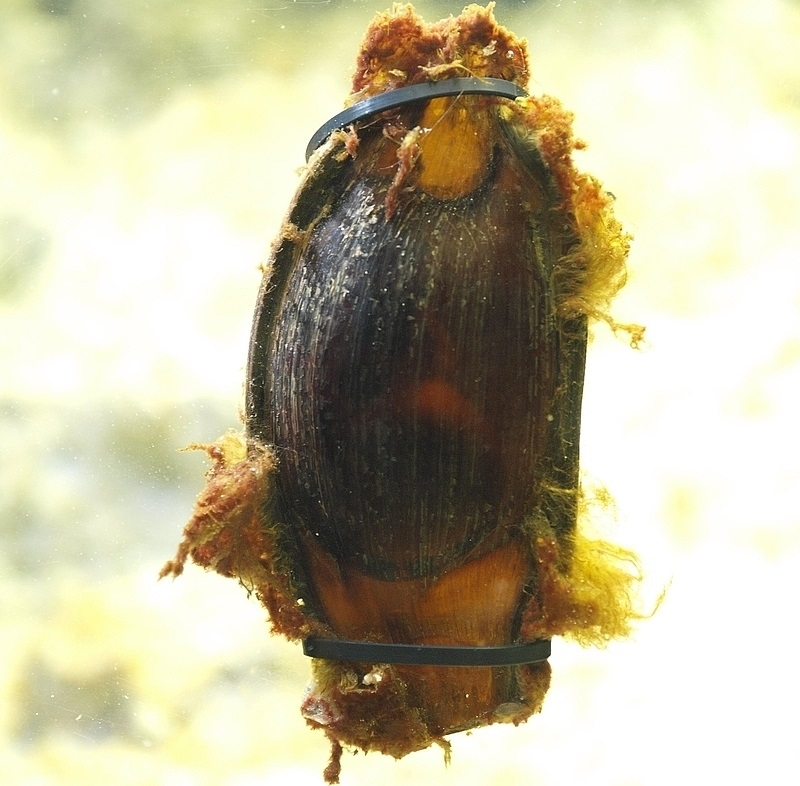
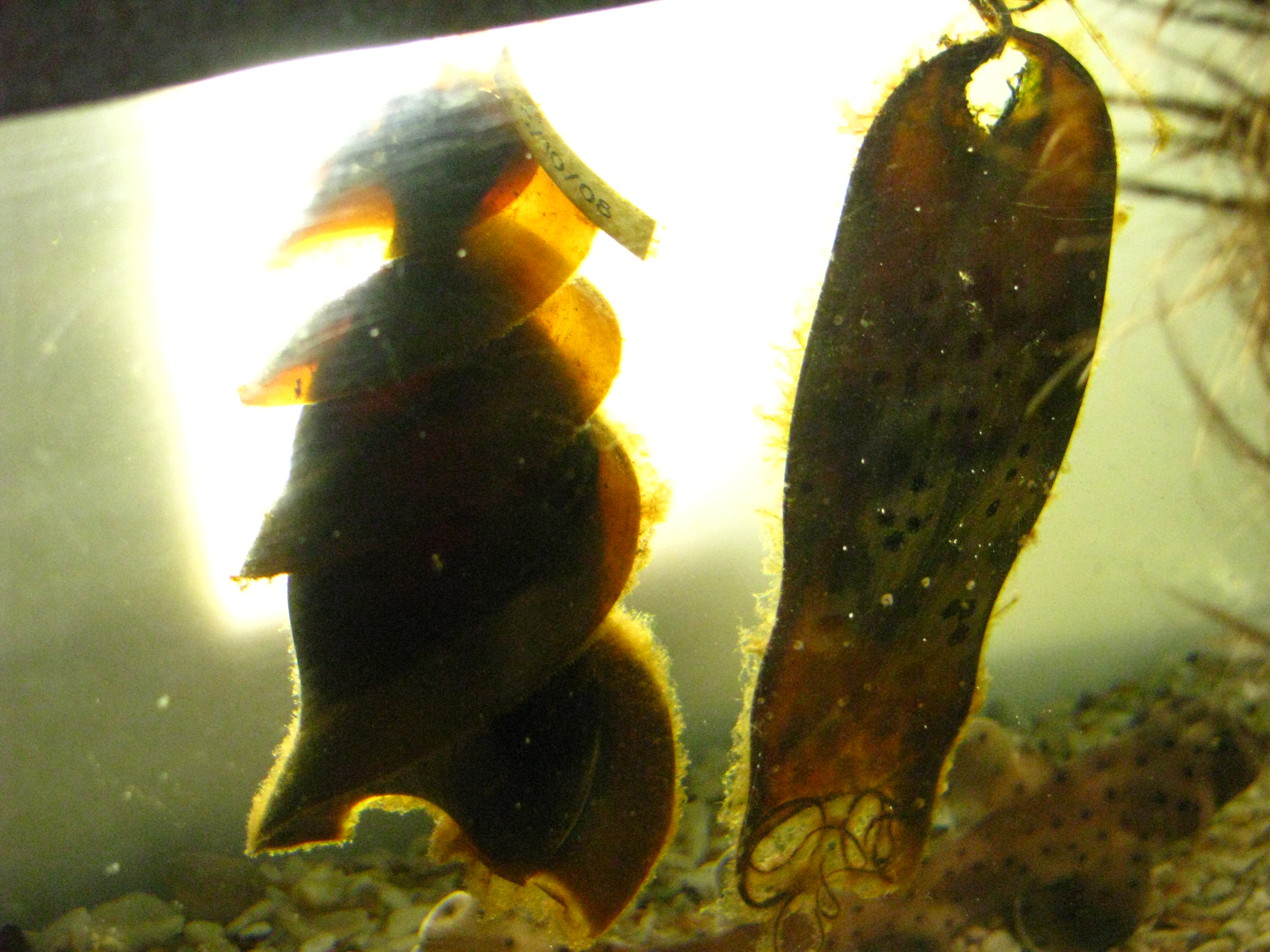
Common name	Image	Taxonomy	Reef safe	Description	Max size
Whitespotted bamboo shark		Chiloscyllium plagiosum	No	Requires a minimum 160 gallon aquarium. Does well in home aquaria and will mate/reproduce in larger aquariums. Sometimes called the Marbled Bamboo Cat Shark.	83 cm (32.7 in)
Brownbanded bamboo shark		Chiloscyllium punctatum	No	Requires a minimum 170 gallon aquarium. One of the most common sharks in the North American aquarium trade and does well in home aquaria as it will easily acclimate to captivity and will mate/reproduce in aquariums. Juveniles may take a while to begin feeding if newly acquired. Sometimes called the Banded catshark.	132 cm (52.0 in)
Epaulette shark		Hemiscyllium ocellatum	with caution (eats inverts)	Requires a minimum 260 gallon aquarium. One of the best sharks for home aquaria as it will easily acclimate to captivity and will mate/reproduce in aquariums. Adult males might behave aggressively to other male sharks including male Epualette sharks, and harass females. they aren't very active so a 200-gallon may be acceptable	107 cm (42.1 in)
Horn shark		Heterodontus francisci	No	Requires a minimum 240 gallon aquarium. A sub-tropical species of shark. The most common bullhead shark in the North American aquarium trade.	122 cm (48.0 in)
Port Jackson shark		Heterodontus portusjacksoni	No	Requires a minimum 750 gallon aquarium. A sub-tropical species of shark which may be a host to numerous parasites. It will also eat small fish at night.	165 cm (65.0 in)
Coral catshark		Atelomycterus marmoratus	No	Requires a minimum 110 gallon aquarium. Active during the night and will try to eat fish housed with them (even ones that are too big to swallow). Two color variants are commonly found in fish stores in the US. Also called the Marbled catshark which is a different species of shark (Atelomycterus macleayi).	70 cm (27.6 in)
Marbled catshark		Atelomycterus macleayi	No	Requires a minimum 70 gallon aquarium. Uncommon in the aquarium trade although it is an ideal aquarium species of shark. Commonly confused with the Coral catshark (Atelomycterus marmoratus). Unlike the Coral catshark which is black with white spots and bars, the Marbled catshark is pale with black spots and seven grey saddles and is smaller and more docile.	60 cm (23.6 in)
Nurse shark		Ginglymostoma cirratum	No	Requires a minimum 4,800 gallon aquarium. Although durable, the Nurse shark will grow too large for most home aquariums. It is an aggressive feeder which will make it harder for you to feed more reclusive sharks and it can knock over/rearrange aquarium decorations in a small aquarium.	430 cm (169.3 in)
Zebra shark		Stegostoma fasciatum	No	Requires a minimum 6,200 gallon aquarium. The Zebra shark will grow too large for most home aquariums. Sometimes the juveniles of this shark (20–36 cm or 7.9–14.2in long) are sold and require a minimum 100 gallon aquarium. A juvenile Zebra shark is shown in the picture while adults are much larger and have pale coloration with black spots. Also called the Leopard shark which is a different species of shark (Triakis semifasciata).	354 cm (139.4 in)
Leopard shark		Triakis semifasciata	No	Requires a minimum 4,500 gallon aquarium. A sub-tropical species of shark and may live a long time in captivity (there are reports of over 20 years).	198 cm (78.0 in)
Banded houndshark		Triakis scyllium	With Caution	Requires a minimum 750 gallon aquarium. Markings on the shark fade with age but not completely.	150 cm (59.1 in)
Gray smooth-hound		Mustelus californicus	No	Requires a minimum 1,700 gallon aquarium. A sub-tropical and active species of shark that requires a tank with plenty of room to swim which will do better in circular and oval shaped tanks rather than rectangular ones. It will jump out of uncovered aquariums.	116 cm (45.7 in)
Brown smooth-hound		Mustelus henlei	No	Requires a minimum 1,200 gallon aquarium. A sub-tropical and active species of shark that requires a tank with plenty of room to swim. This shark will do better in circular and oval shaped tanks where they can have an uninterrupted swimming pattern rather than rectangular tanks. It will jump out of uncovered aquariums and it is more likely to suffer from shipping stress than its less active relatives.	100 cm (39.4 in)
Tasselled wobbegong		Eucrossorhinus dasypogon	No	Requires a minimum 360 gallon aquarium. Will eat any fish or crustacean housed with it that can be swallowed entirely. Slow-growing when not overfed.	125 cm (49.2 in)
Japanese wobbegong		Orectolobus japonicus	No	Requires a minimum 170 gallon aquarium. Rare in the North American aquarium trade.	118 cm (46.5 in)
Ornate wobbegong		Orectolobus ornatus	No	Requires a minimum 3,150 gallon aquarium. The Ornate wobbegong will grow too large for most home aquariums and will eat other elasmobranchs. It is the most common wobbegong in the North American aquarium trade.	290 cm (114.2 in)
Spotted wobbegong		Orectolobus maculatus	No	Requires a minimum 3,150 gallon aquarium. Although durable, the Spotted wobbegong will grow too large for most home aquariums and will eat other elasmobranchs.	320 cm (126.0 in)
Northern wobbegong		Orectolobus wardi	No	Requires a minimum 110 gallon aquarium. The Northern wobbegong has a passive personality and a small maximum size, and may not eat initially when it has been added to an aquarium and is rarely collected. An aquarist can handle this shark without a lot fear of getting bitten.	63 cm (24.8 in)
Blacktip reef shark		Carcharhinus melanopterus	No	Requires a minimum 5,750 gallon aquarium. Easily startled by quick movements and the sudden entry an aquarist in their aquarium which may cause them to jump out of an open tank or hit the walls of their aquarium, leading to death. Must keep swimming in order to breathe thus requiring a very large aquarium.	200 cm (78.7 in)
Whitetip reef shark		Triaenodon obesus	No	Requires a minimum 8,400 gallon aquarium. Can destroy aquarium decorations when moving through the décor to find food. Often has goiter.	213 cm (83.9 in)
Bonnethead shark		Sphyrna tiburo	No	Requires a minimum 2,600 gallon aquarium. Occasionally available and requires expert care. When newly added to an aquarium, the Bonnethead shark will often swim at the surface of the water and lift the front of its head above the surface. When it has settled in, the shark will stop this activity or begin to do it less often. Must keep moving in order to breathe.	213 cm (83.9 in)
Shark egg case		Selachimorpha sp. Egg case (Chondrichthyes)	N/A	May take 70–90+ days to hatch. Chiloscyllium shark egg cases are hardy and available. Heterodontus, Scyliorhinidae, and Stegostoma shark egg cases are also available.	Mixed

== Snappers ==
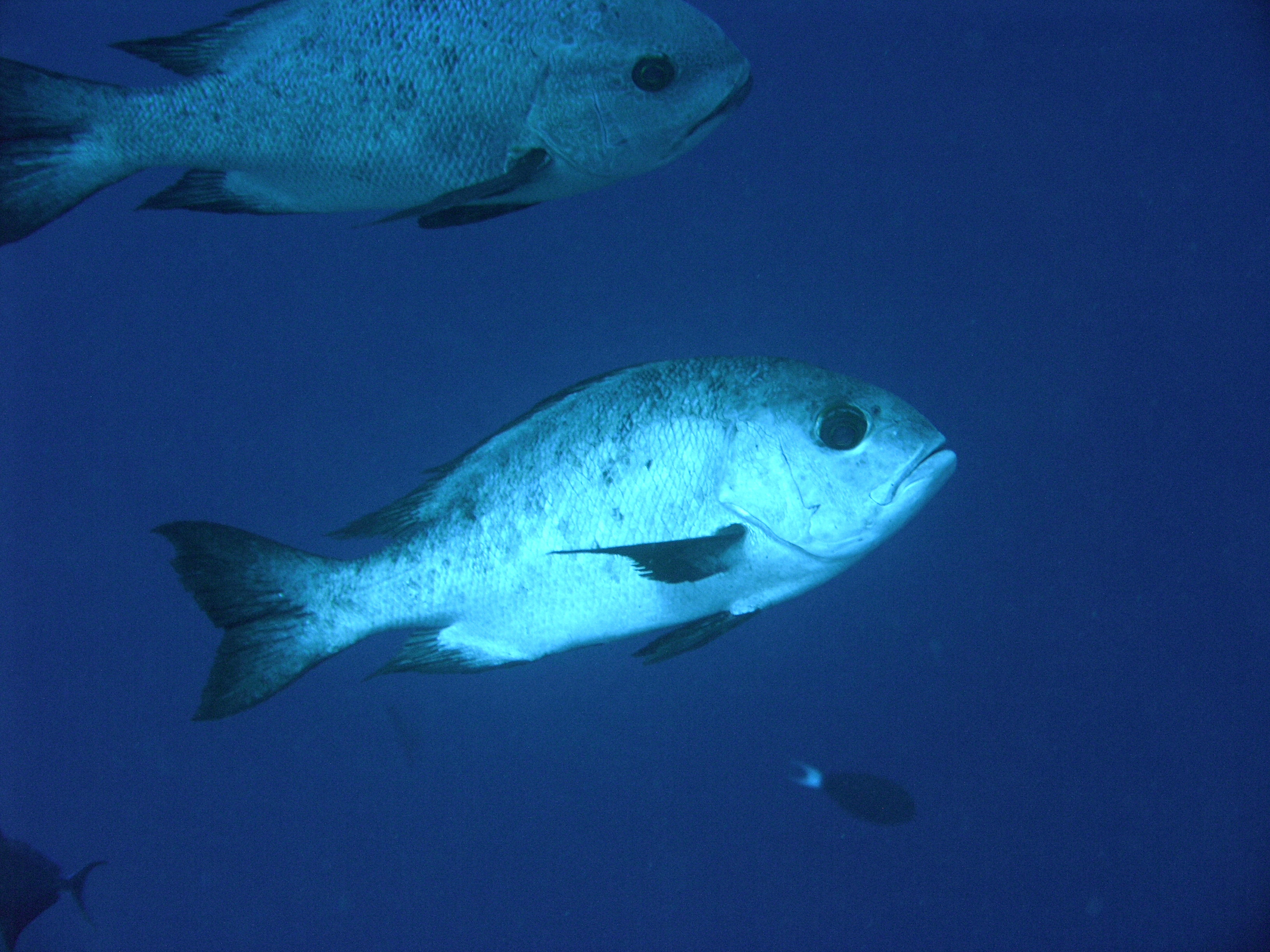
Black snapper

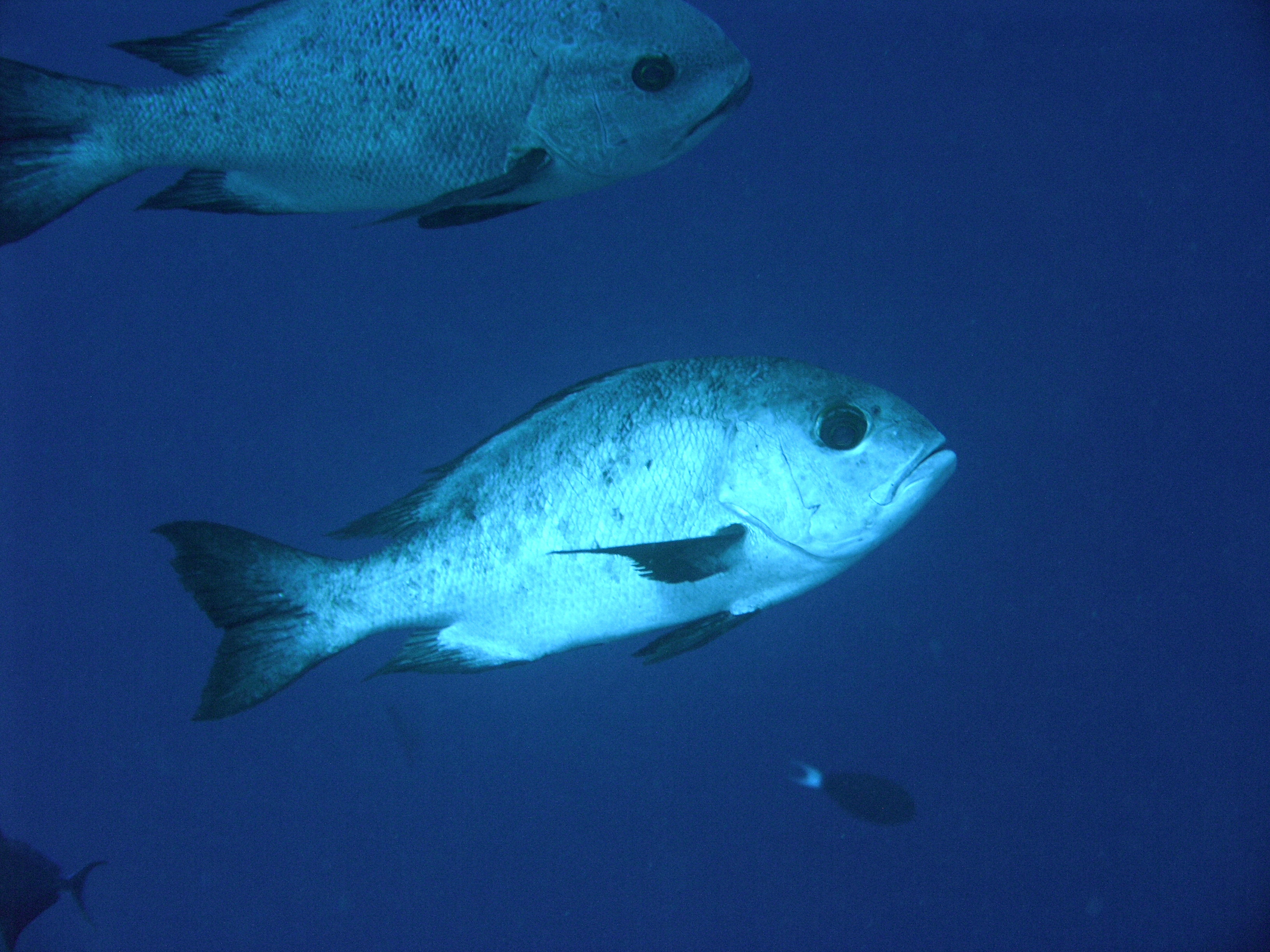
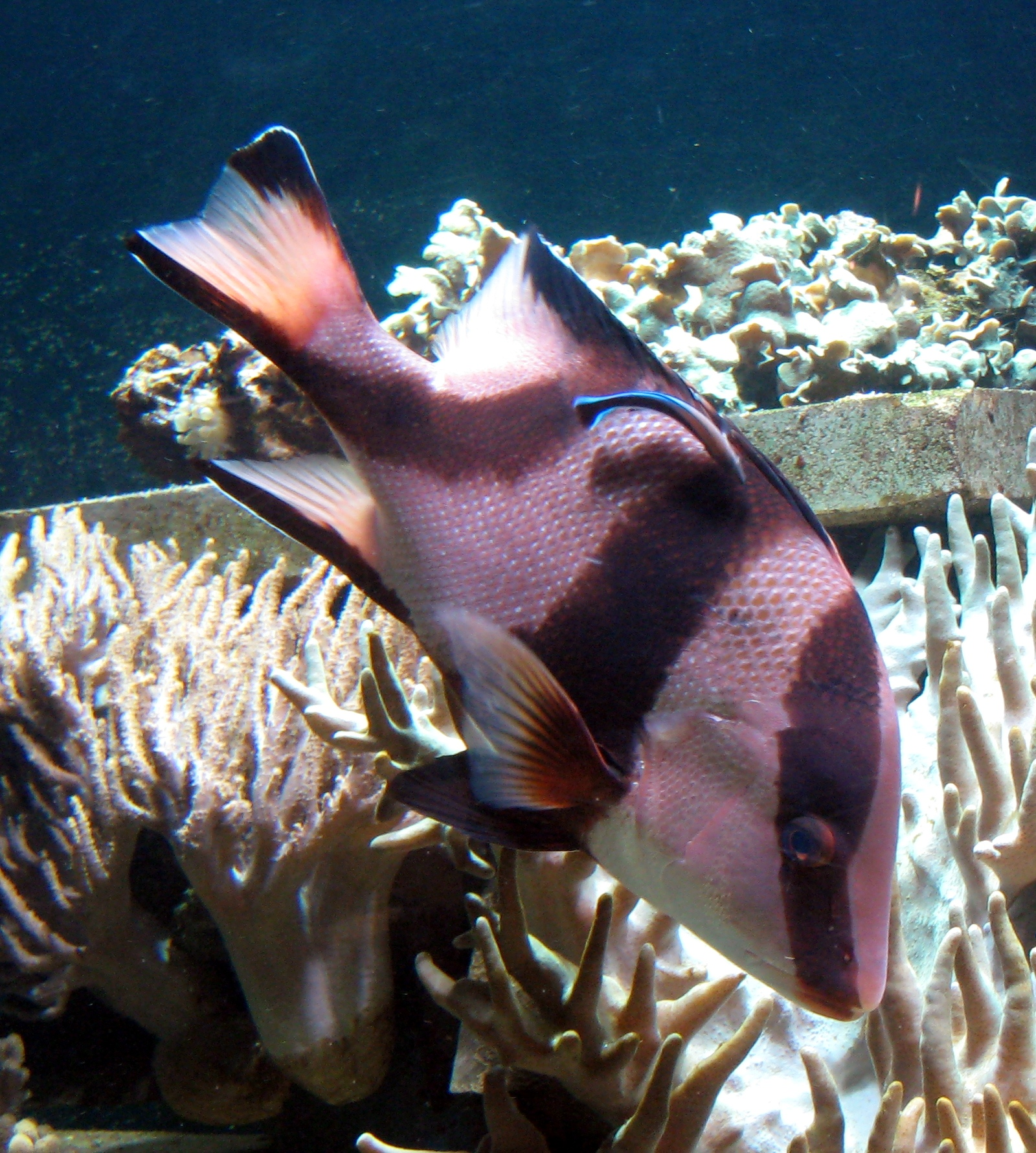
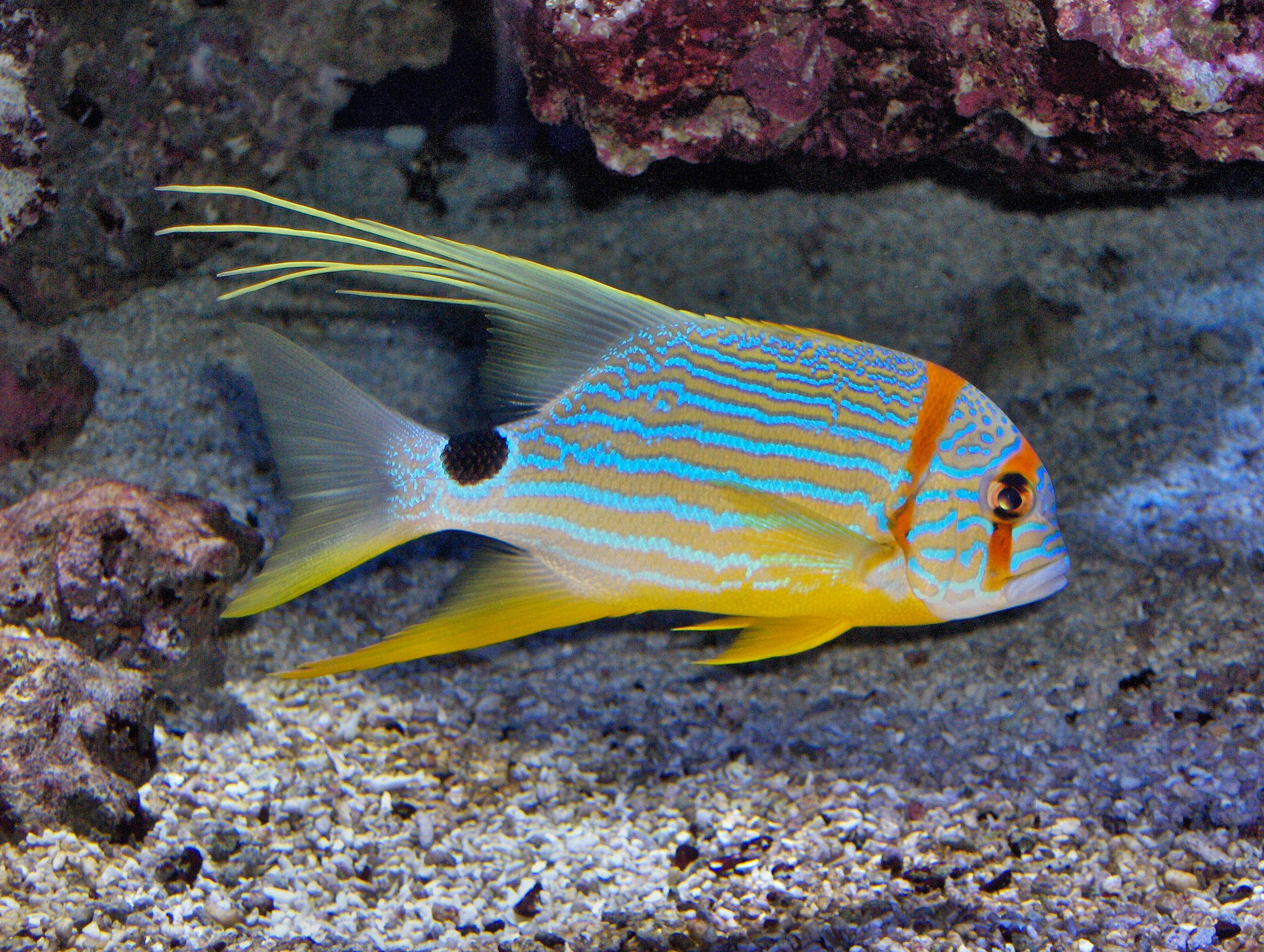
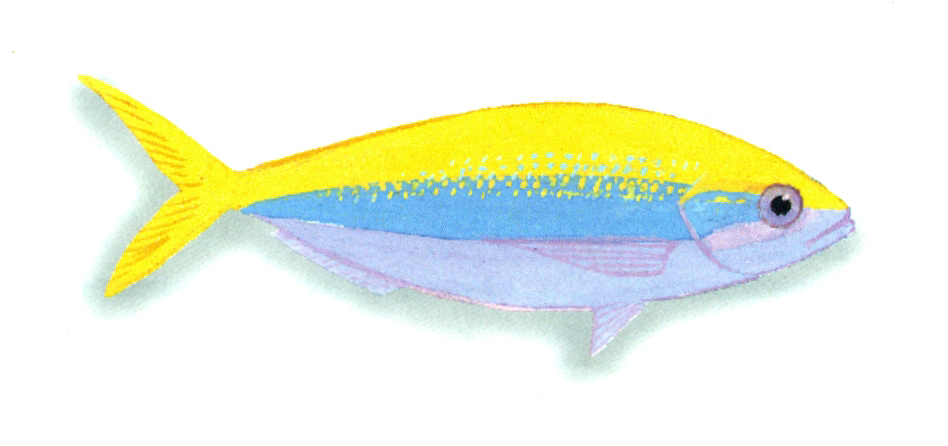
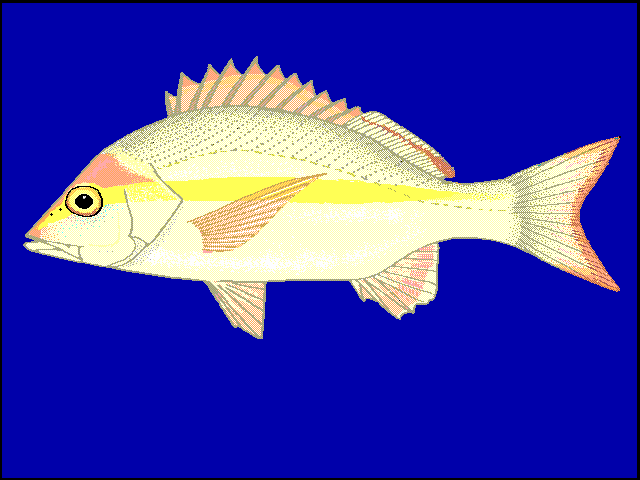
Common name	Image	Taxonomy	Reef safe	Description	Max size
Black snapper, black and white snapper		Macolor niger	No		76 cm (29.9 in)
Emperor snapper		Lutjanus sebae	No		114 cm (44.9 in)
Threadfin snapper		Symphorichthys spilurus	No		58 cm (22.8 in)
Yellowback fusilier		Caesio xanthonota	No		38 cm (15.0 in)
Yellow-Banded Snapper, Hussar Emperor Snapper		Lutjanus adetii	No		50 cm (19.7 in)

== Tangs ==
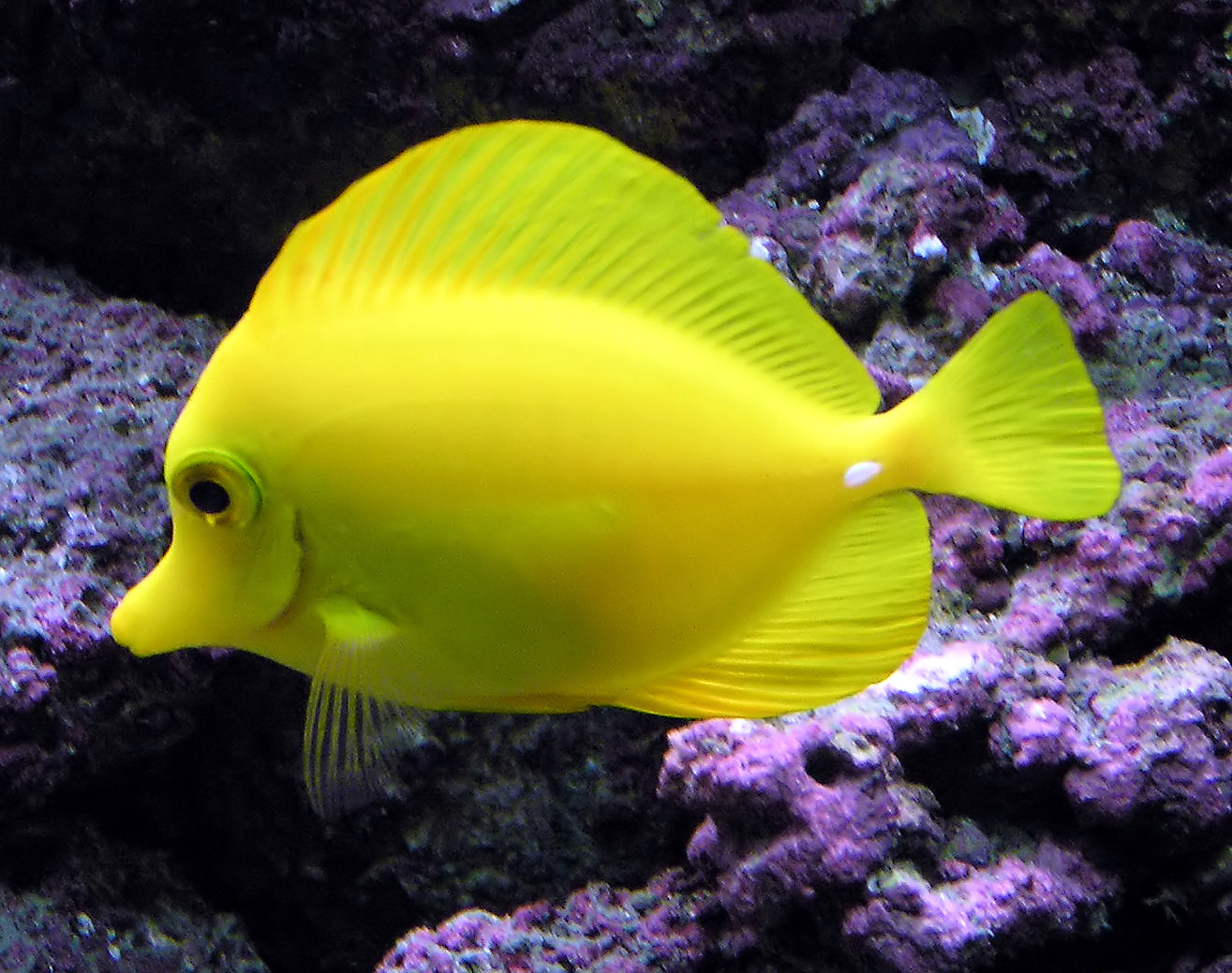
Yellow tang

Tangs generally feed on algae, though there are a few carnivorous species. Most tangs will not tolerate other fish the same color and/or shape as them. They have a spine on their tails that can cut open other fish and unprotected hands. All tangs should be given plenty of swimming room; try to have at least a 4' tank. Contrary to popular belief they will tolerate smaller (4' to 5') tanks just fine but tend to live better in larger tanks, over 5'.

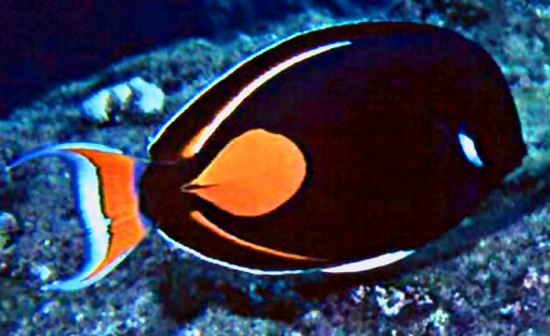
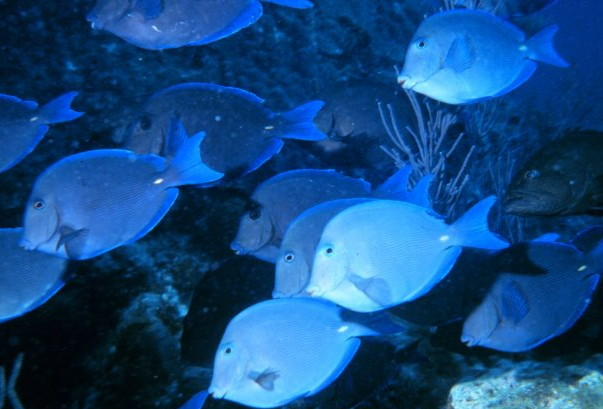
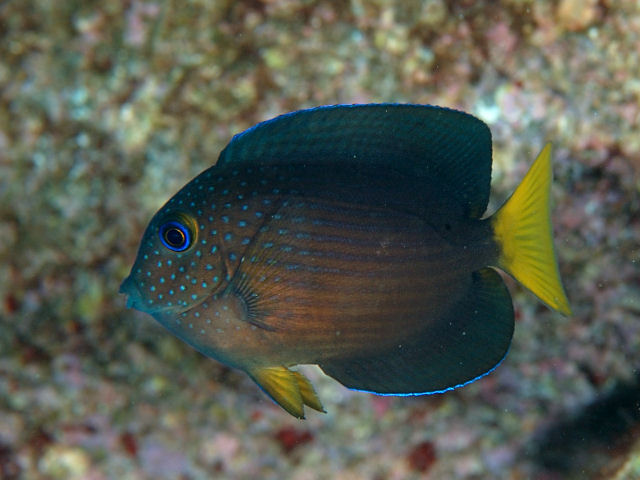
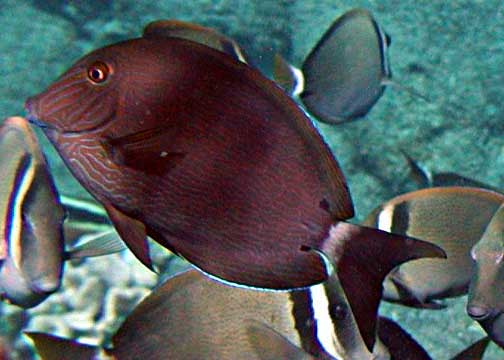
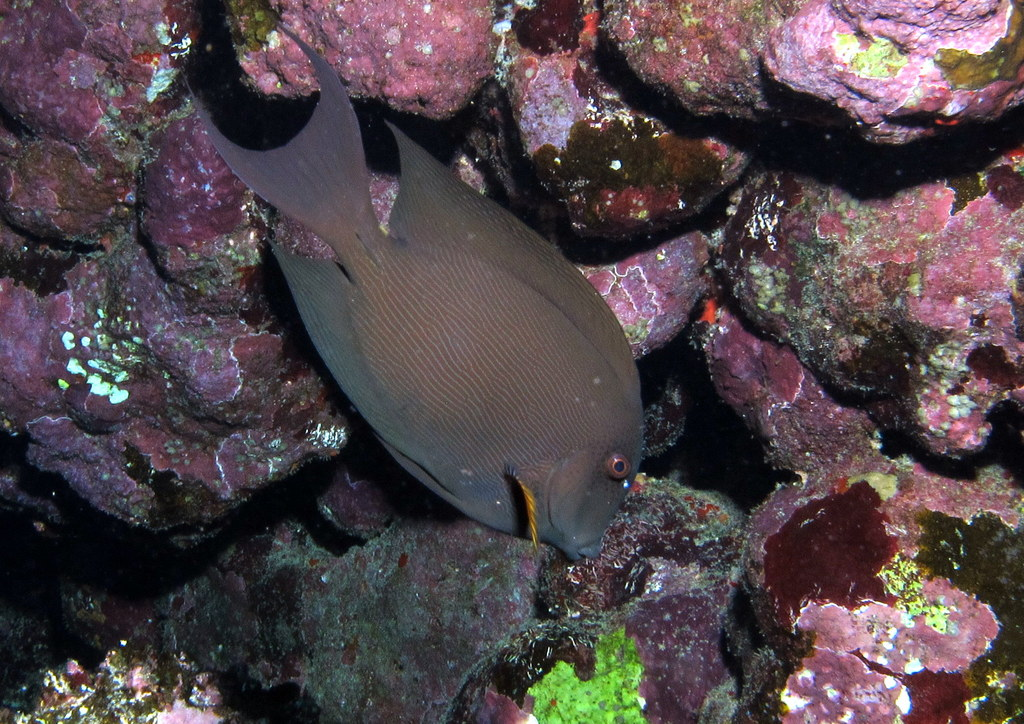
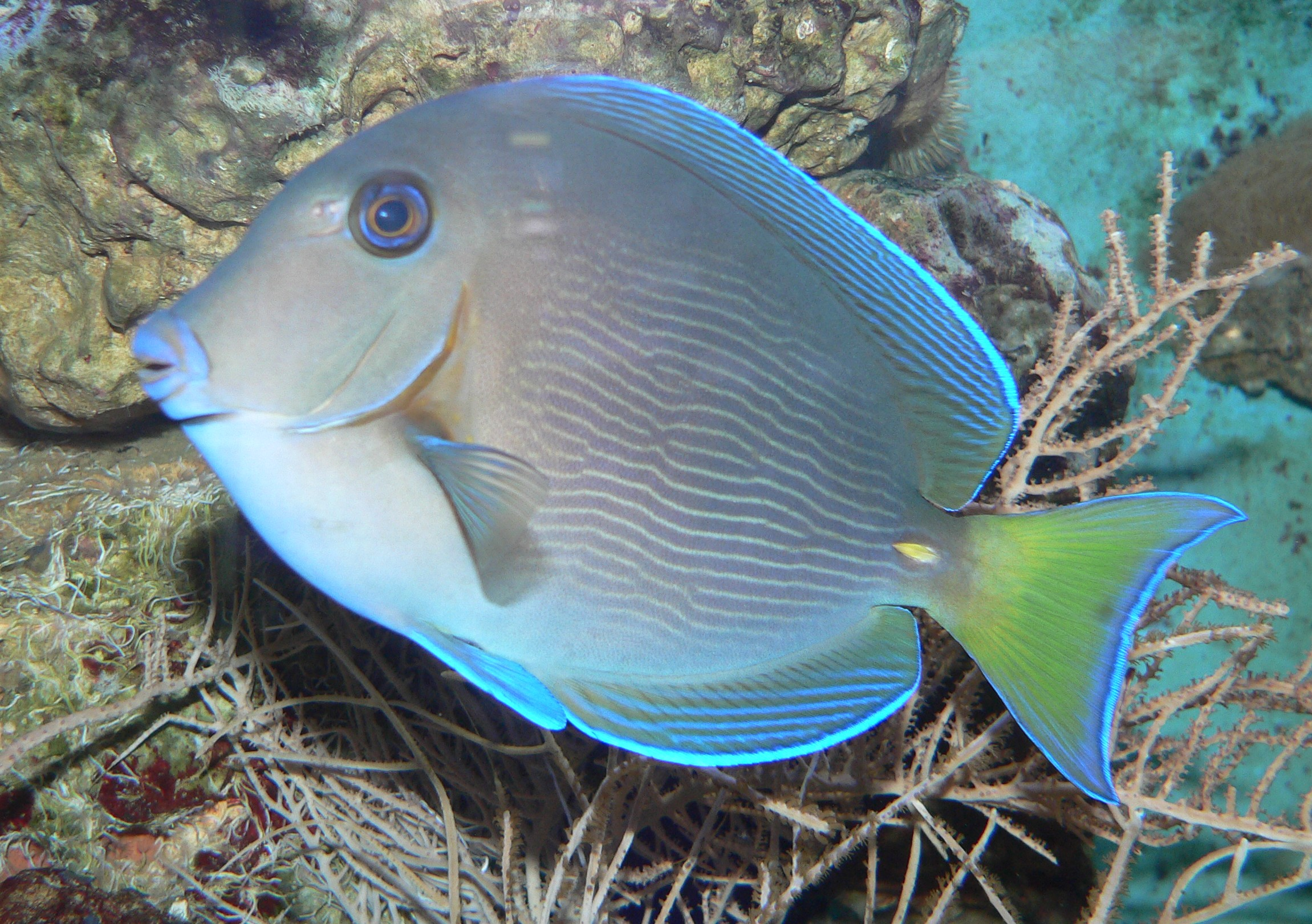
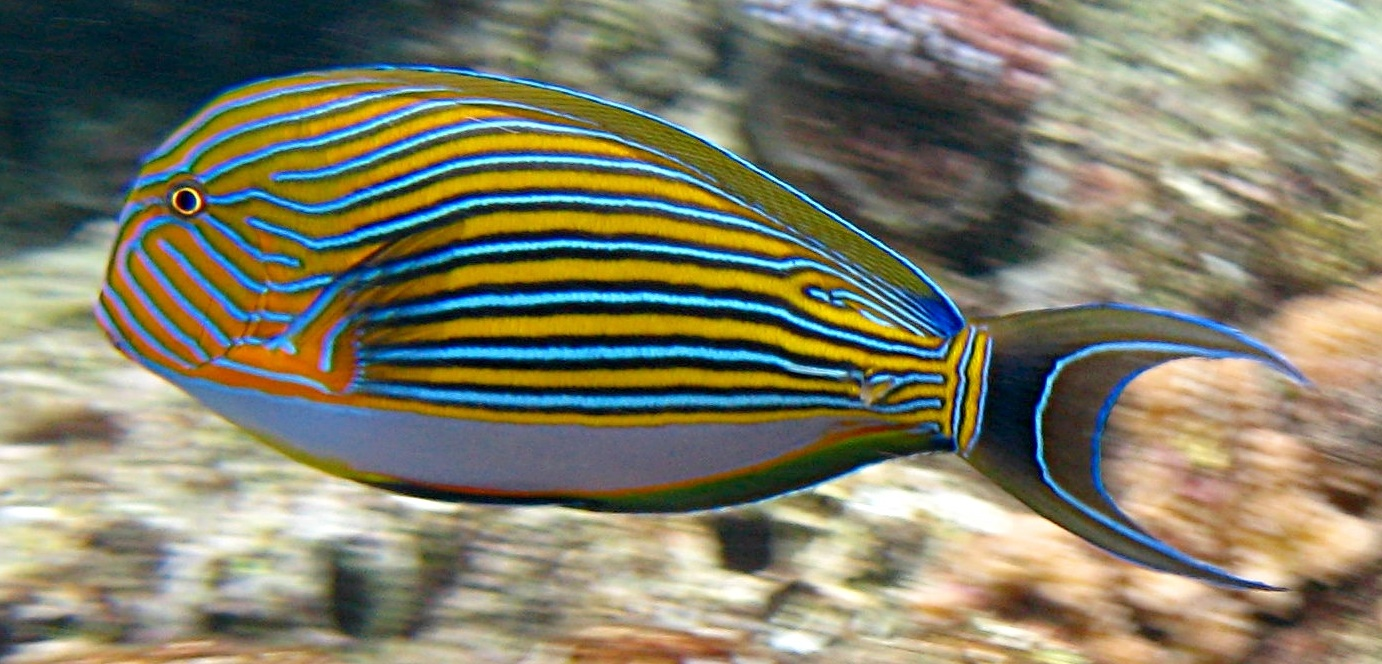
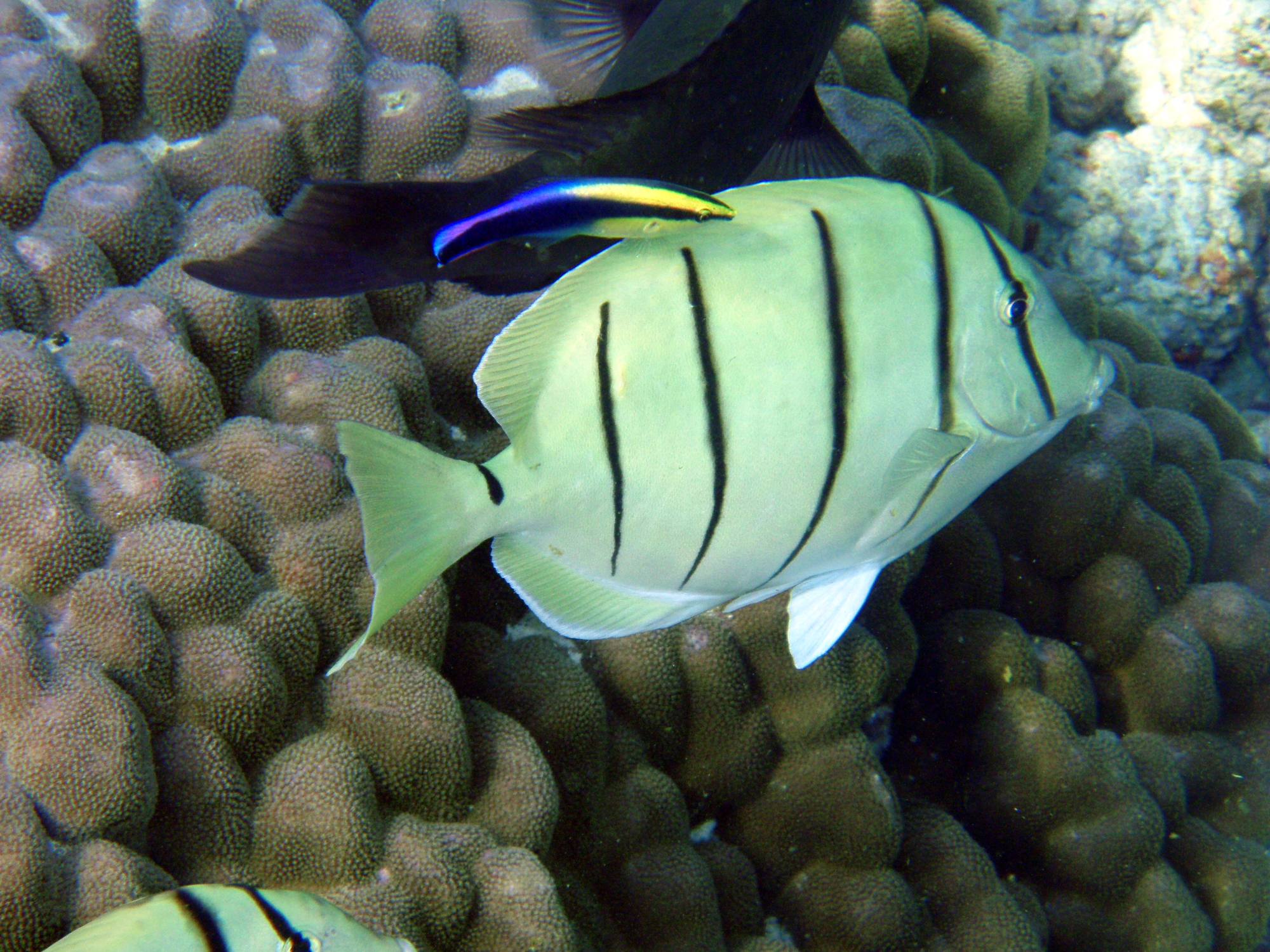
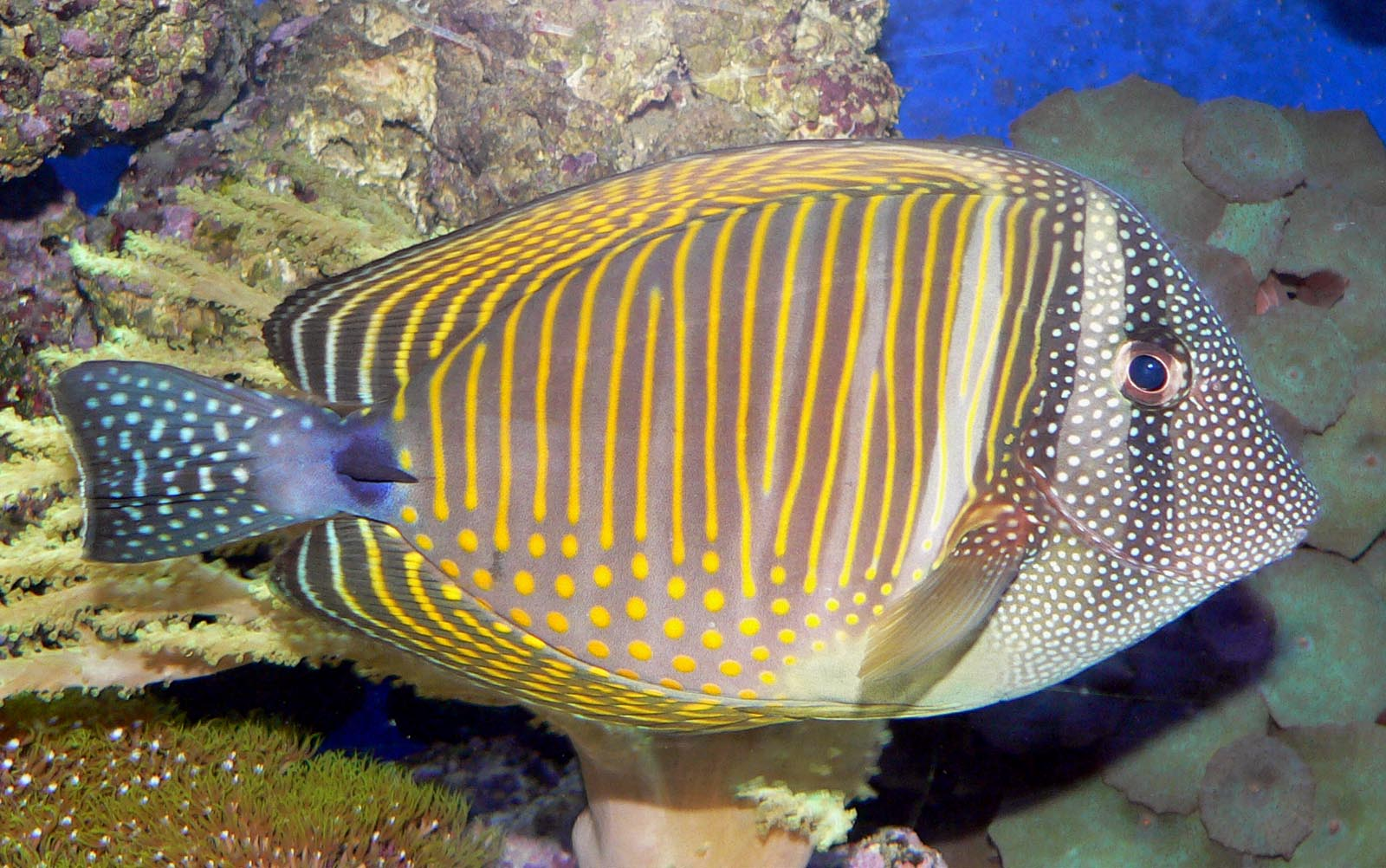
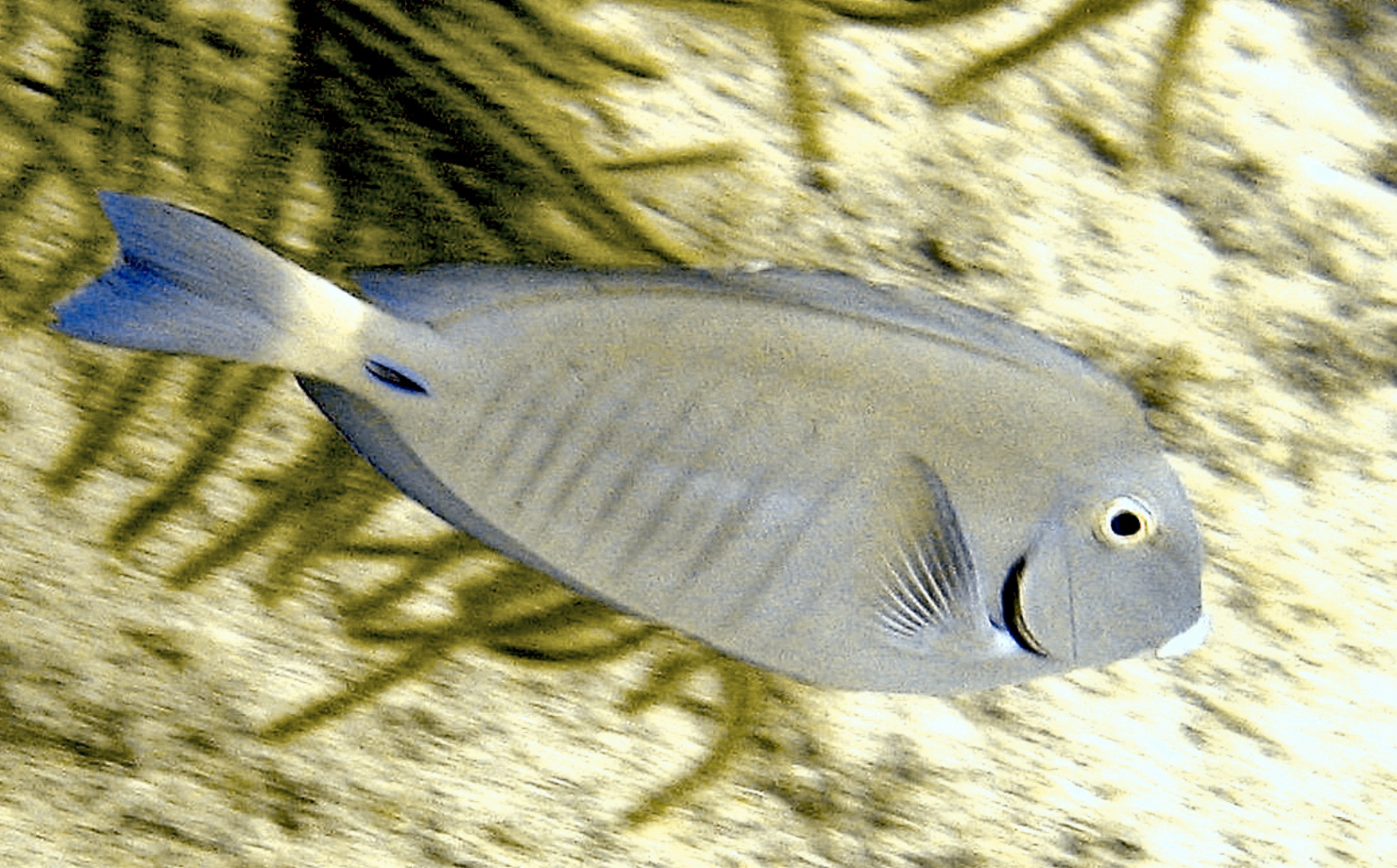
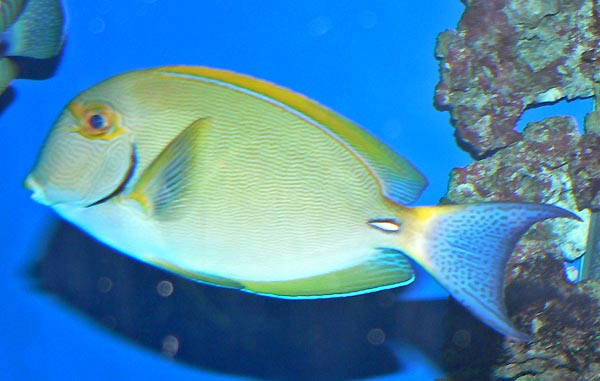
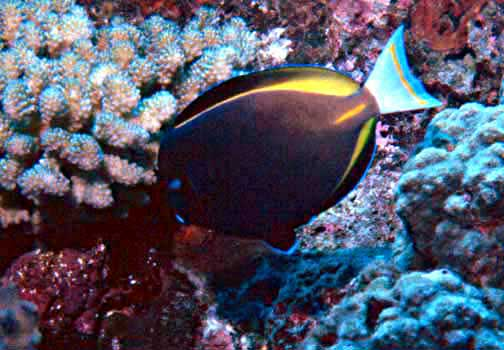
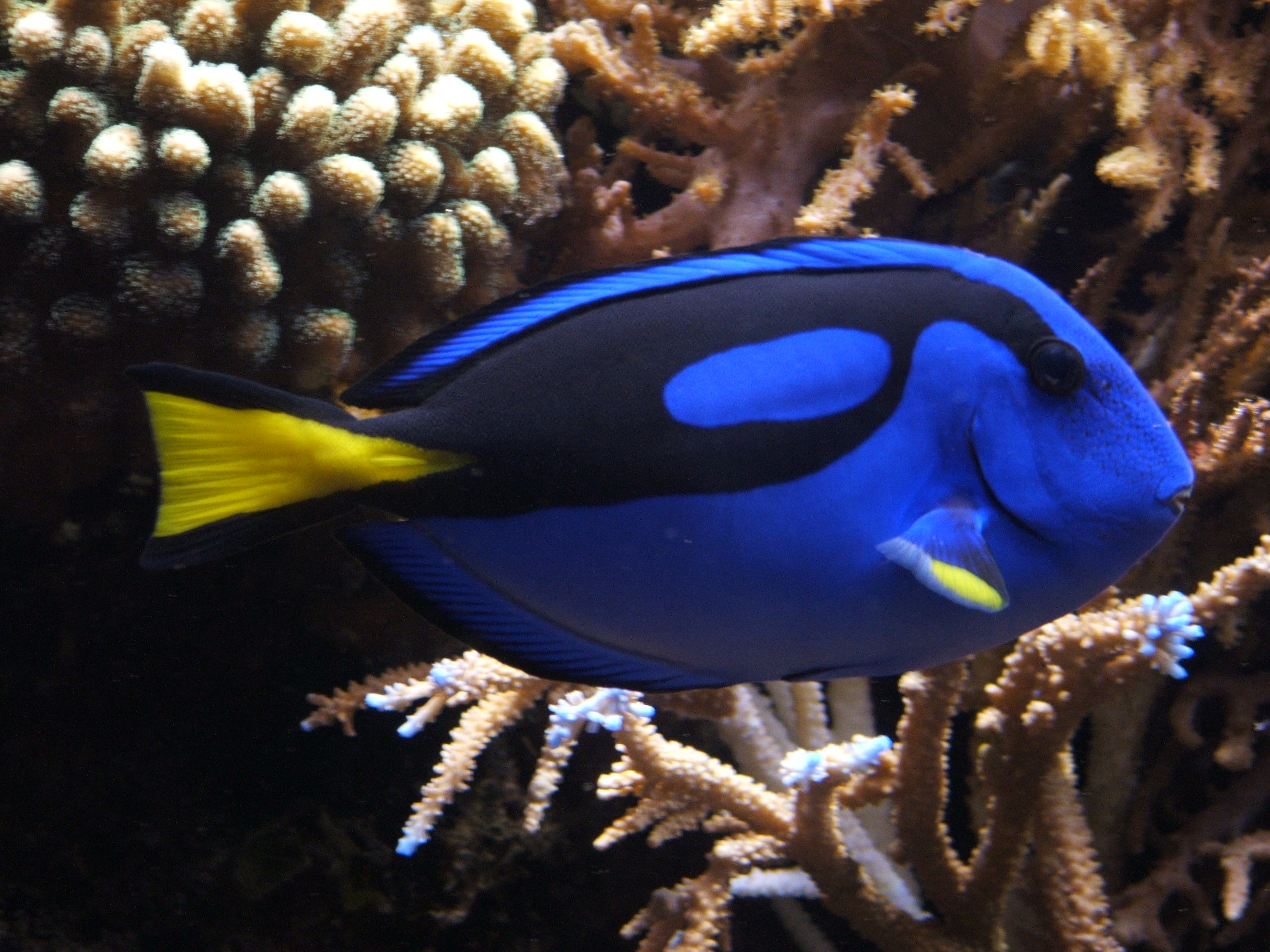
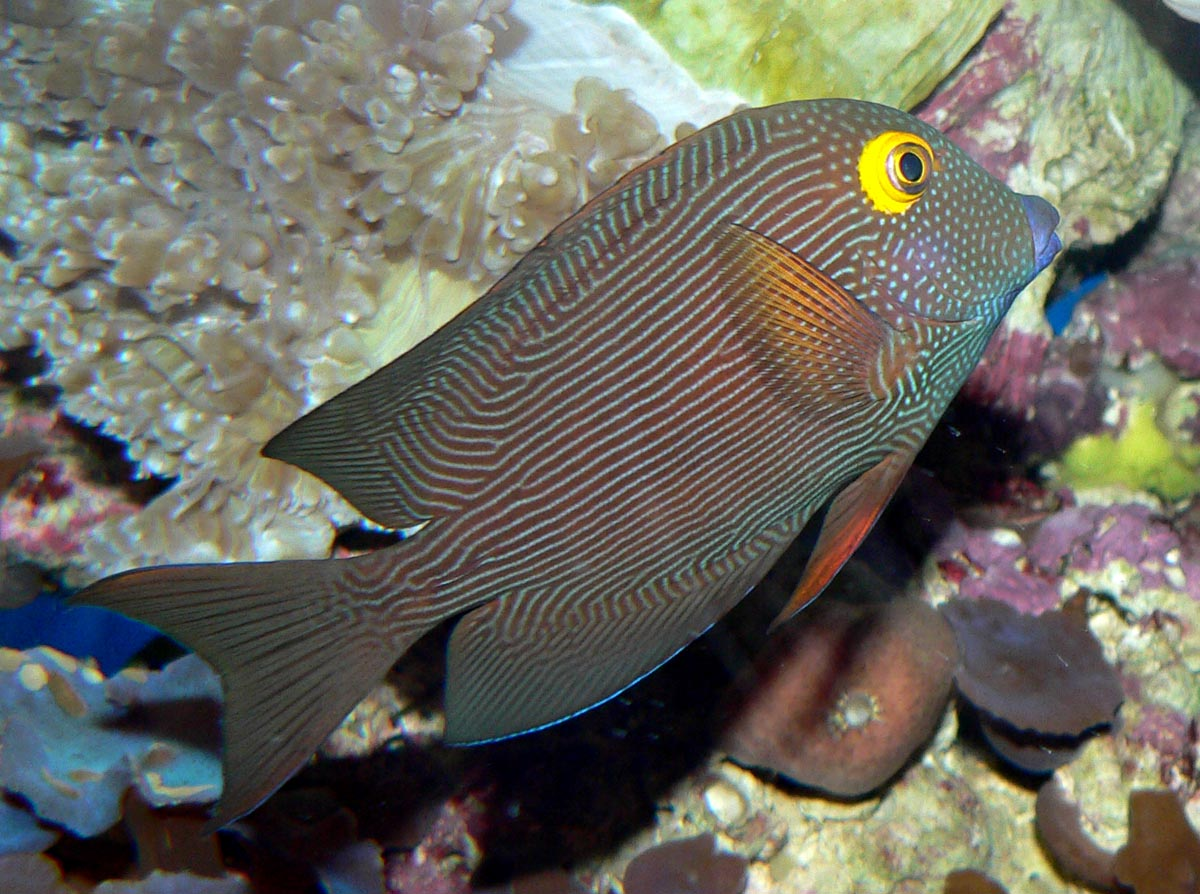
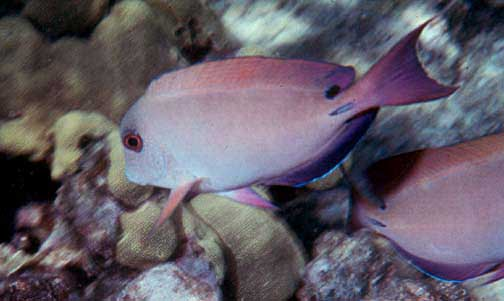
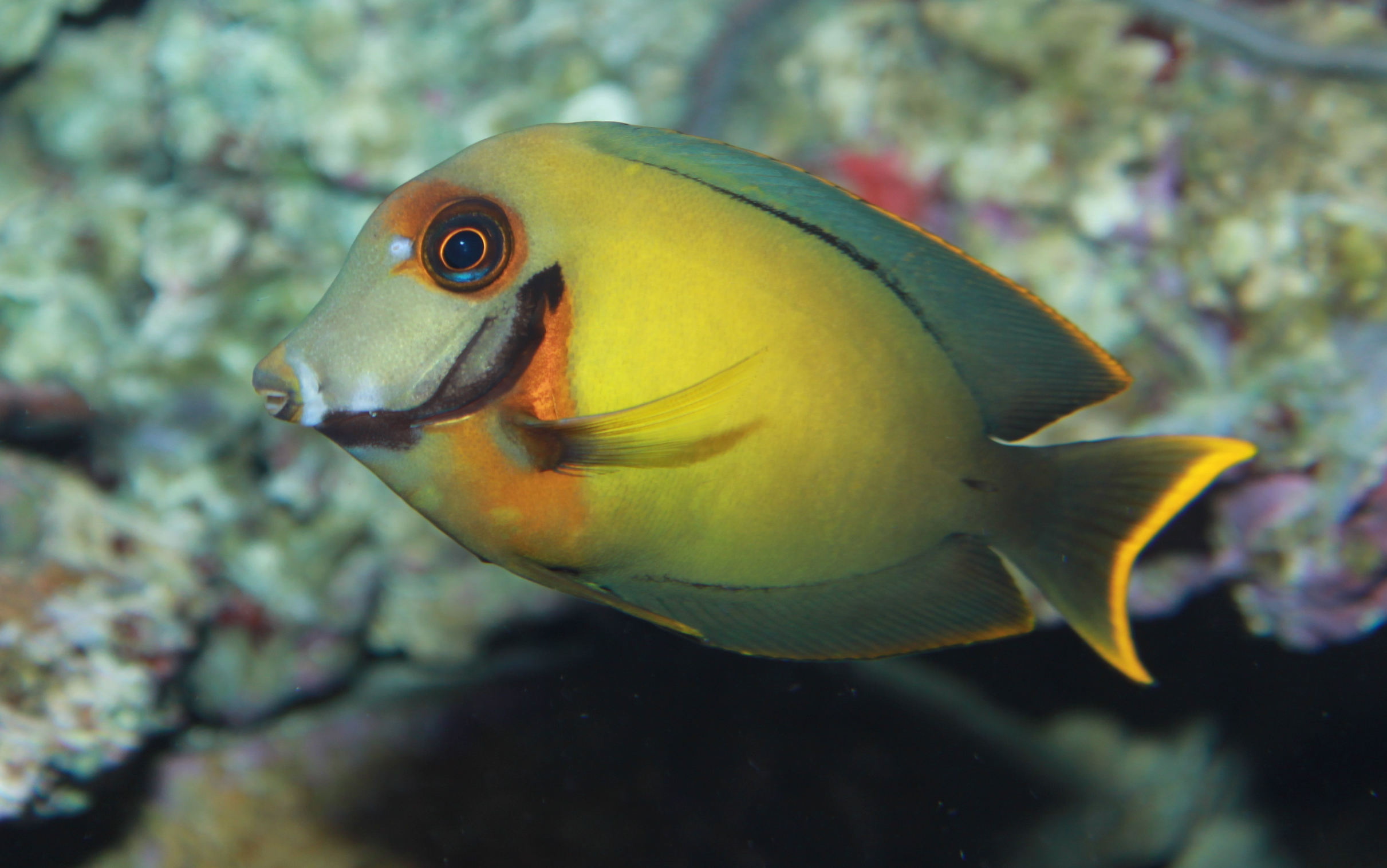
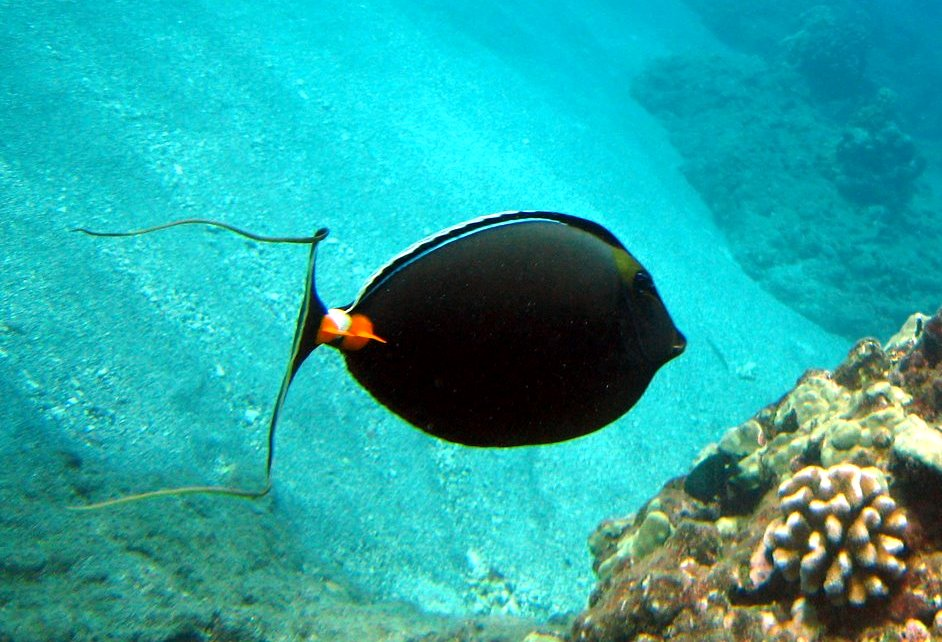
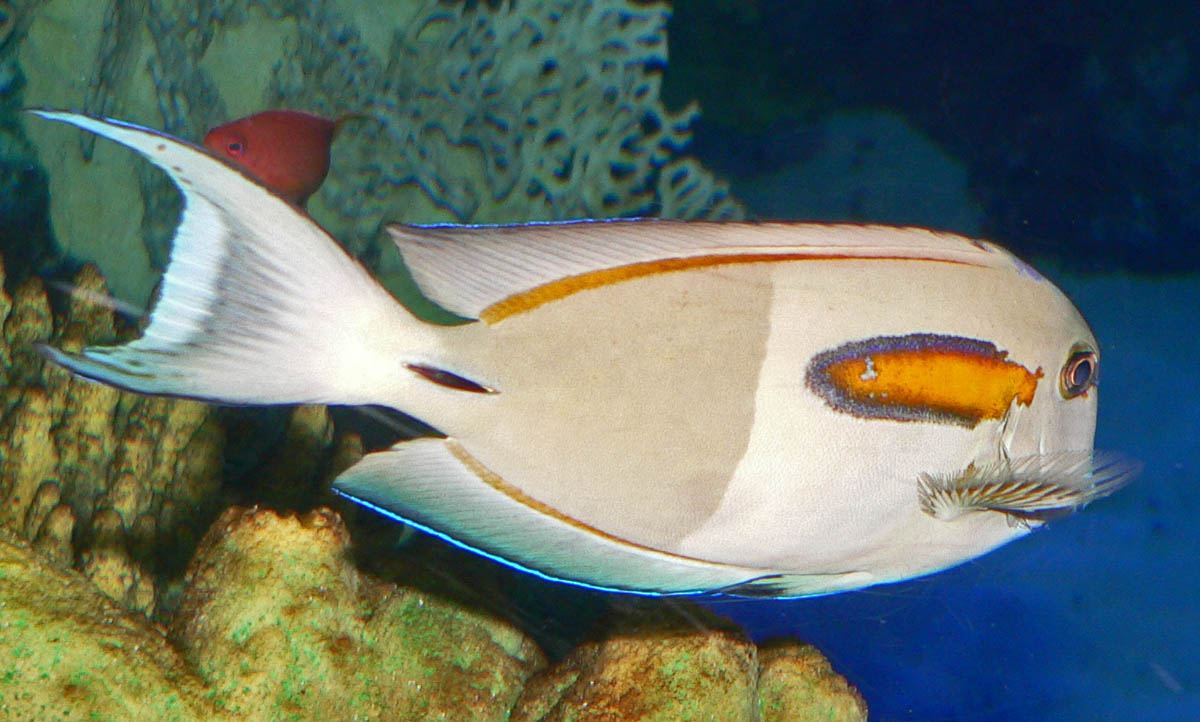
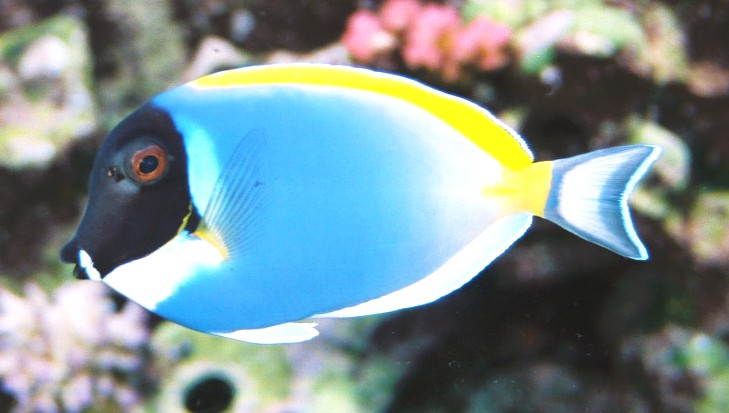
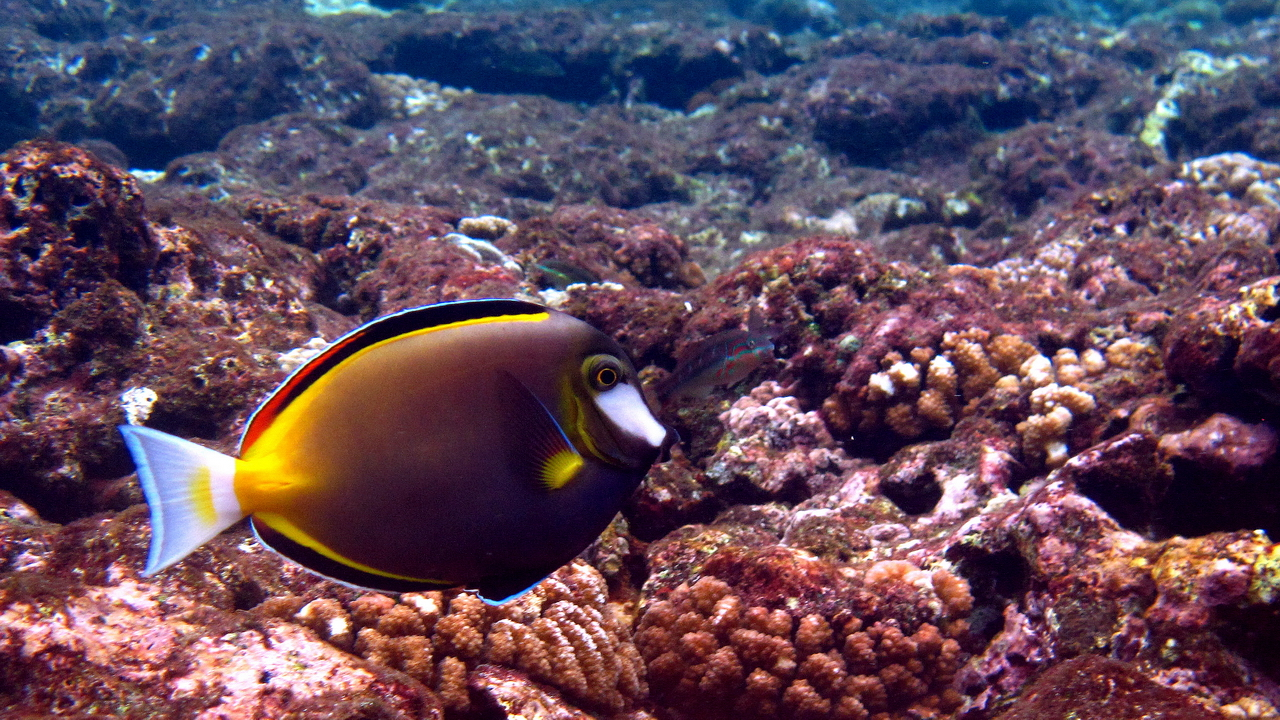
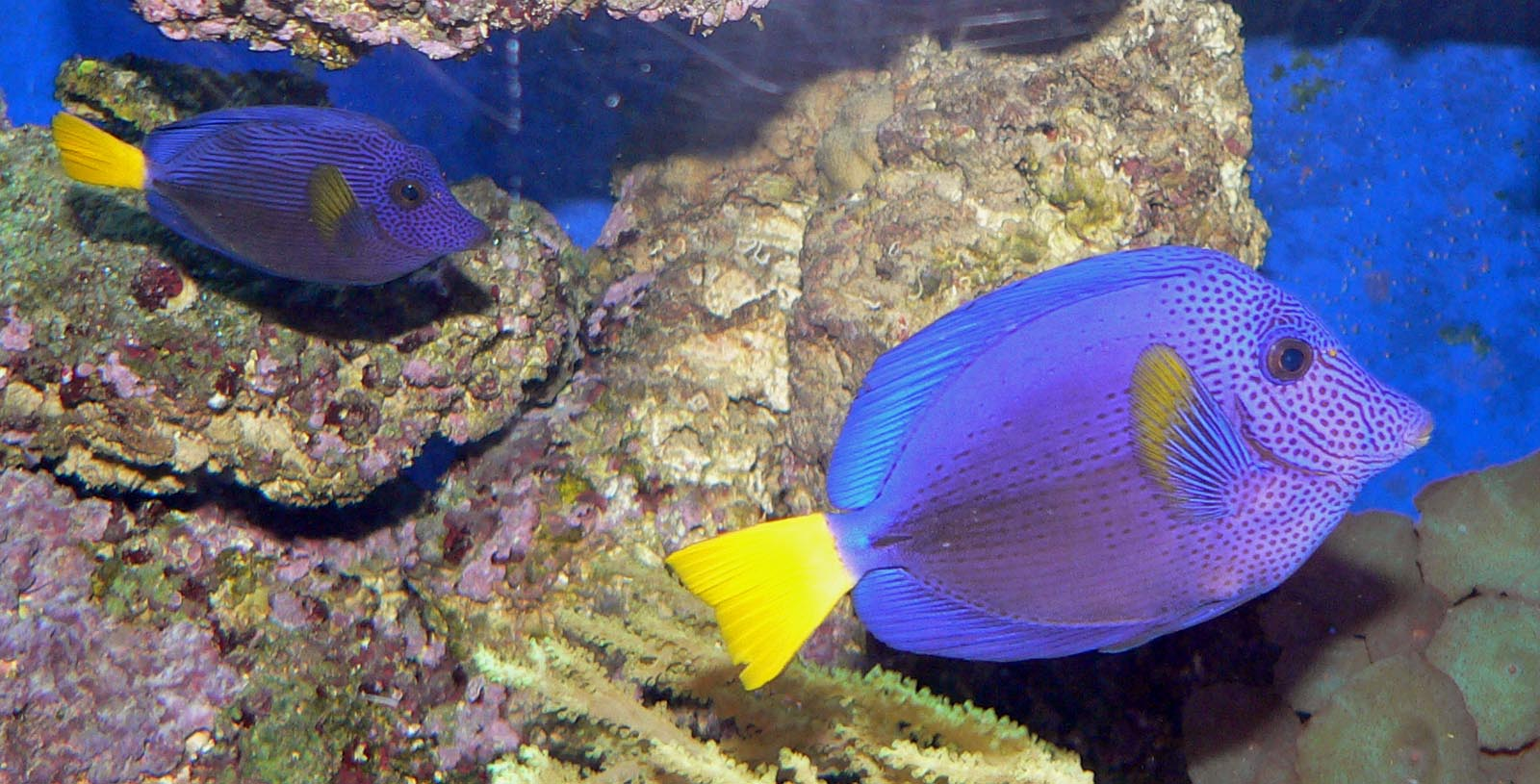
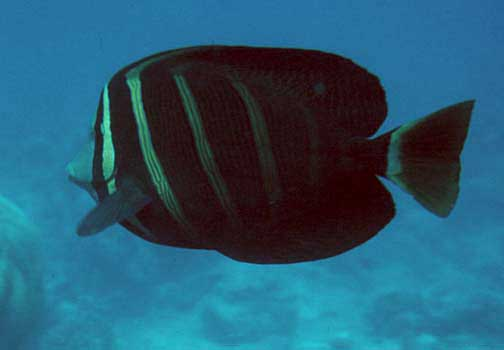
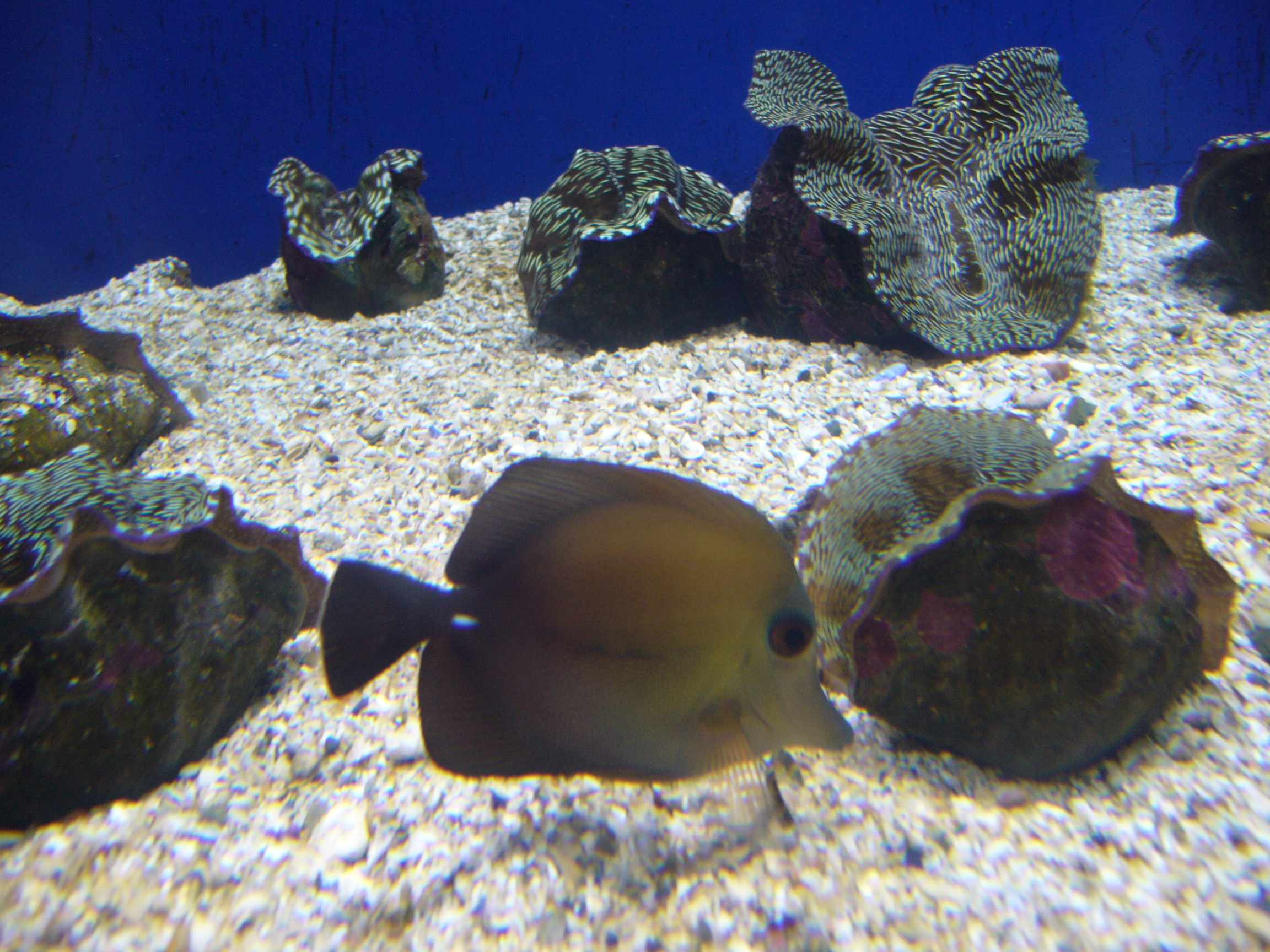
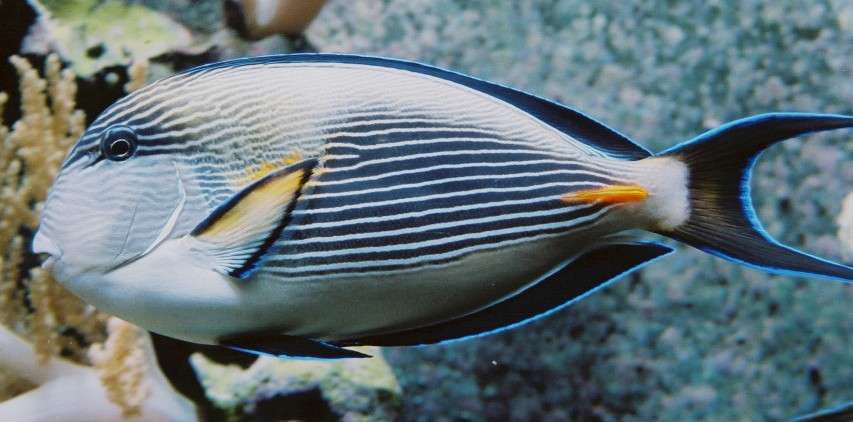
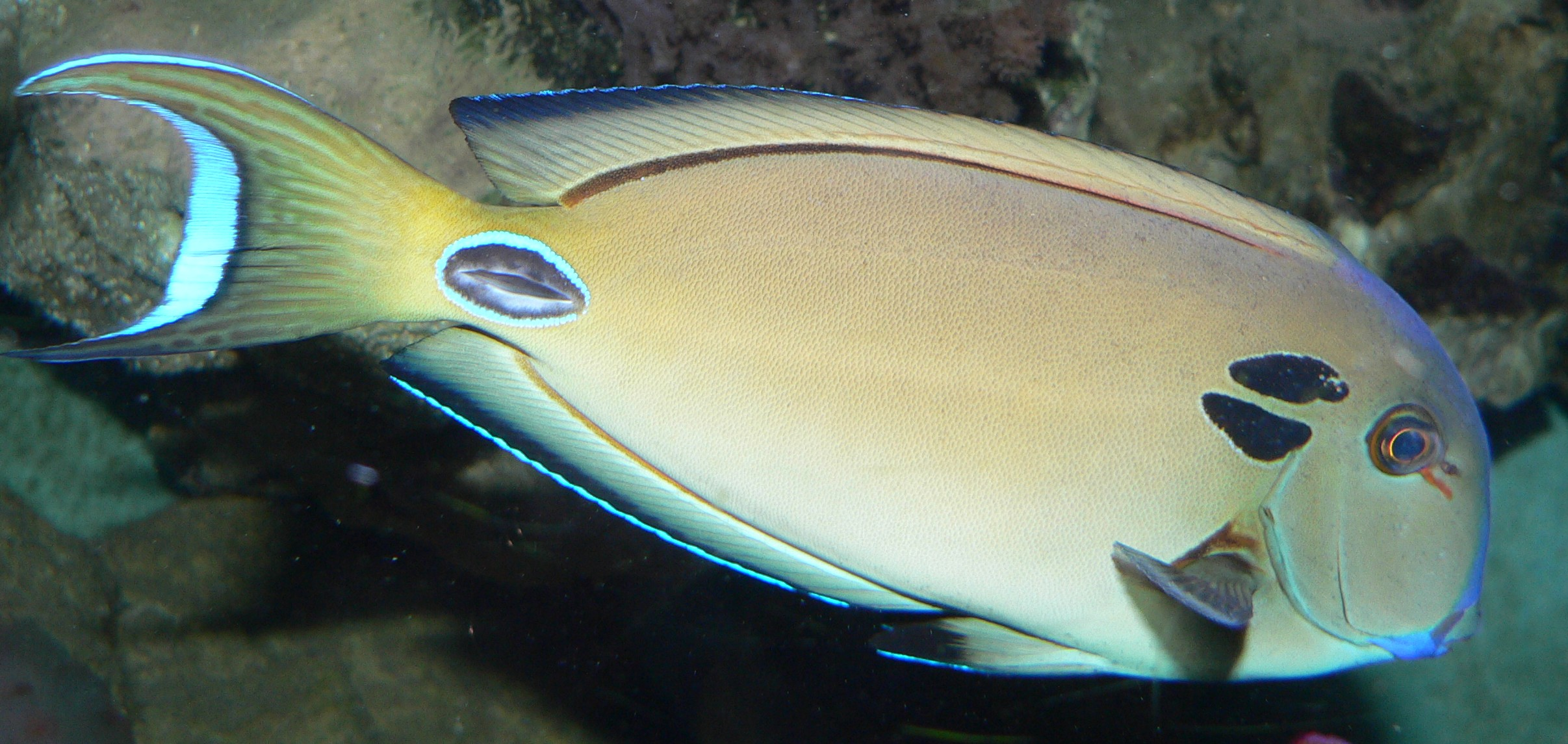
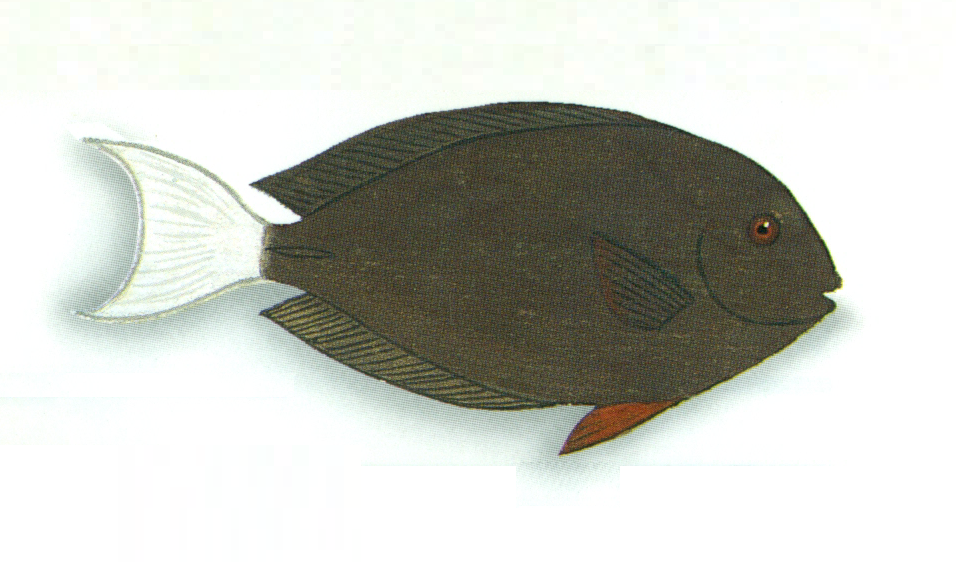
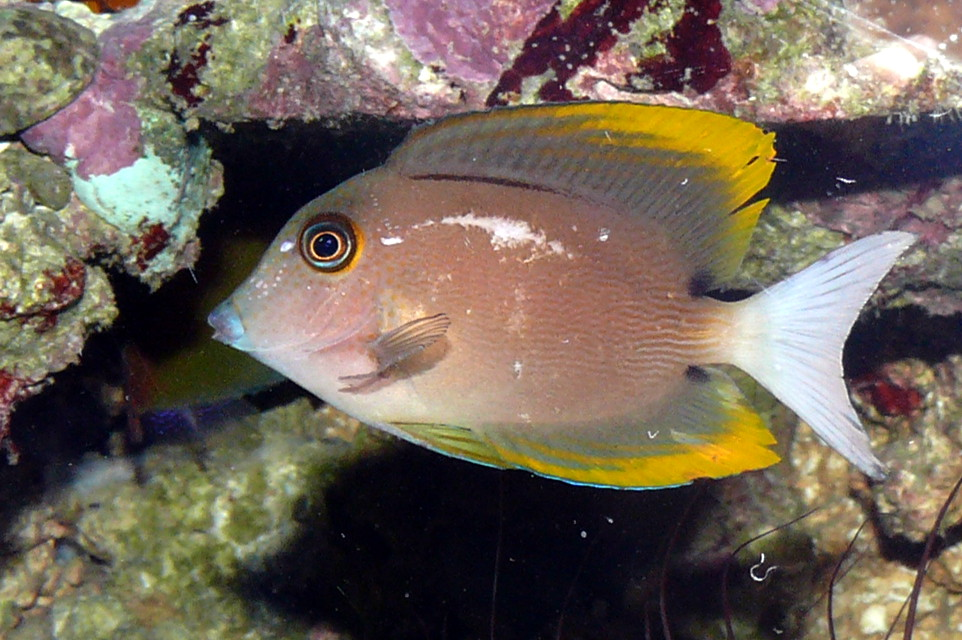
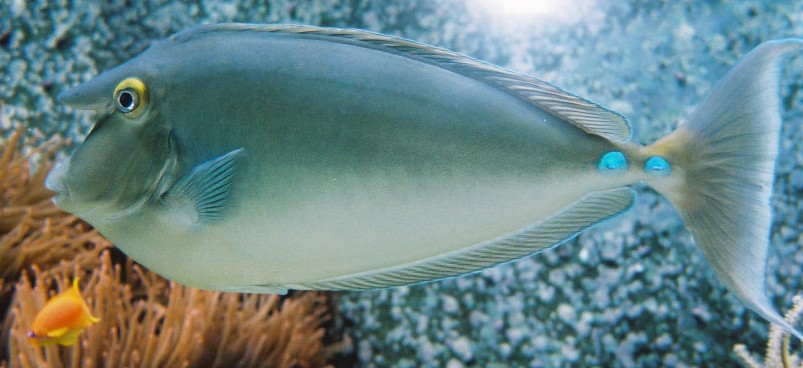
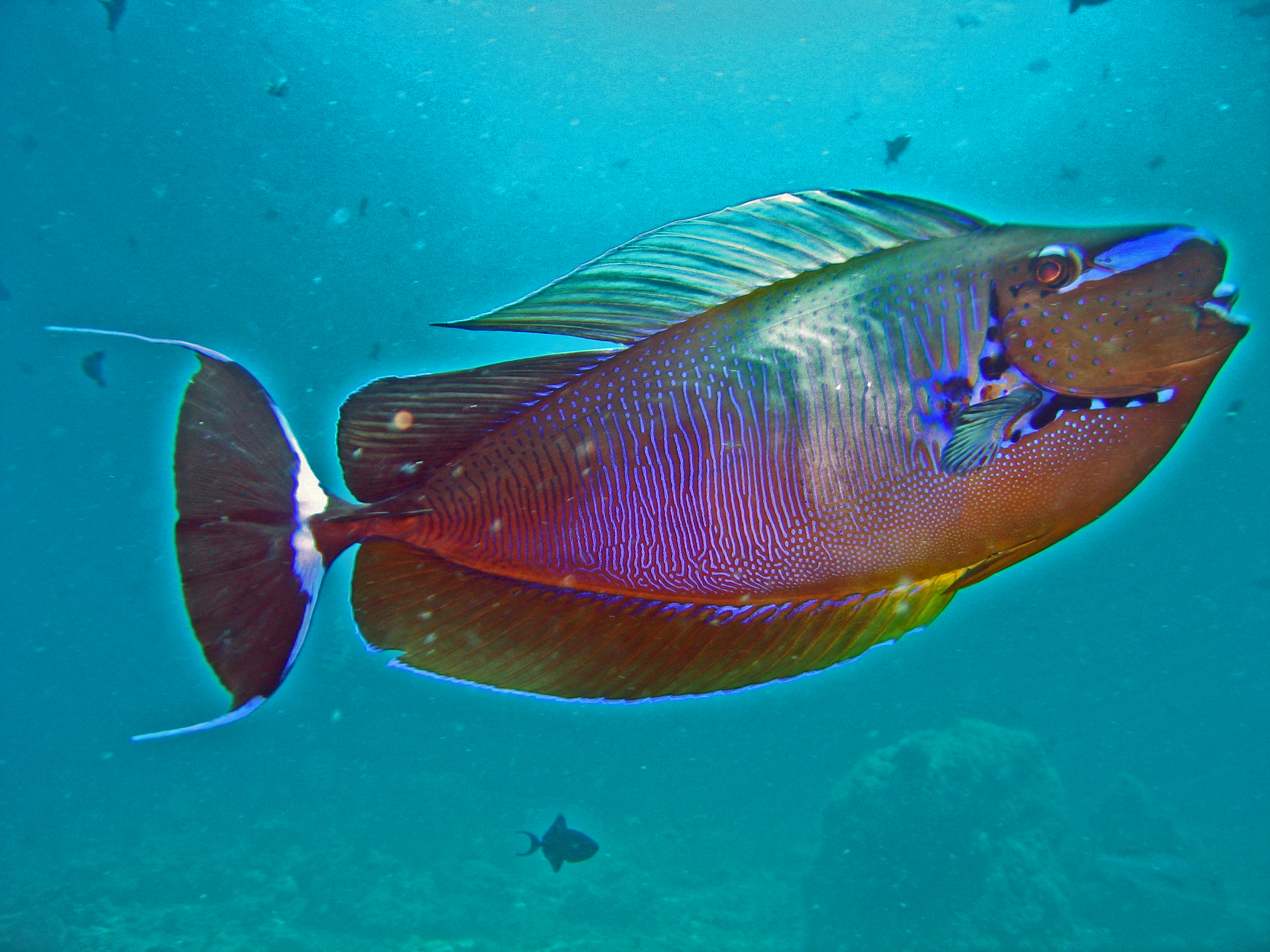
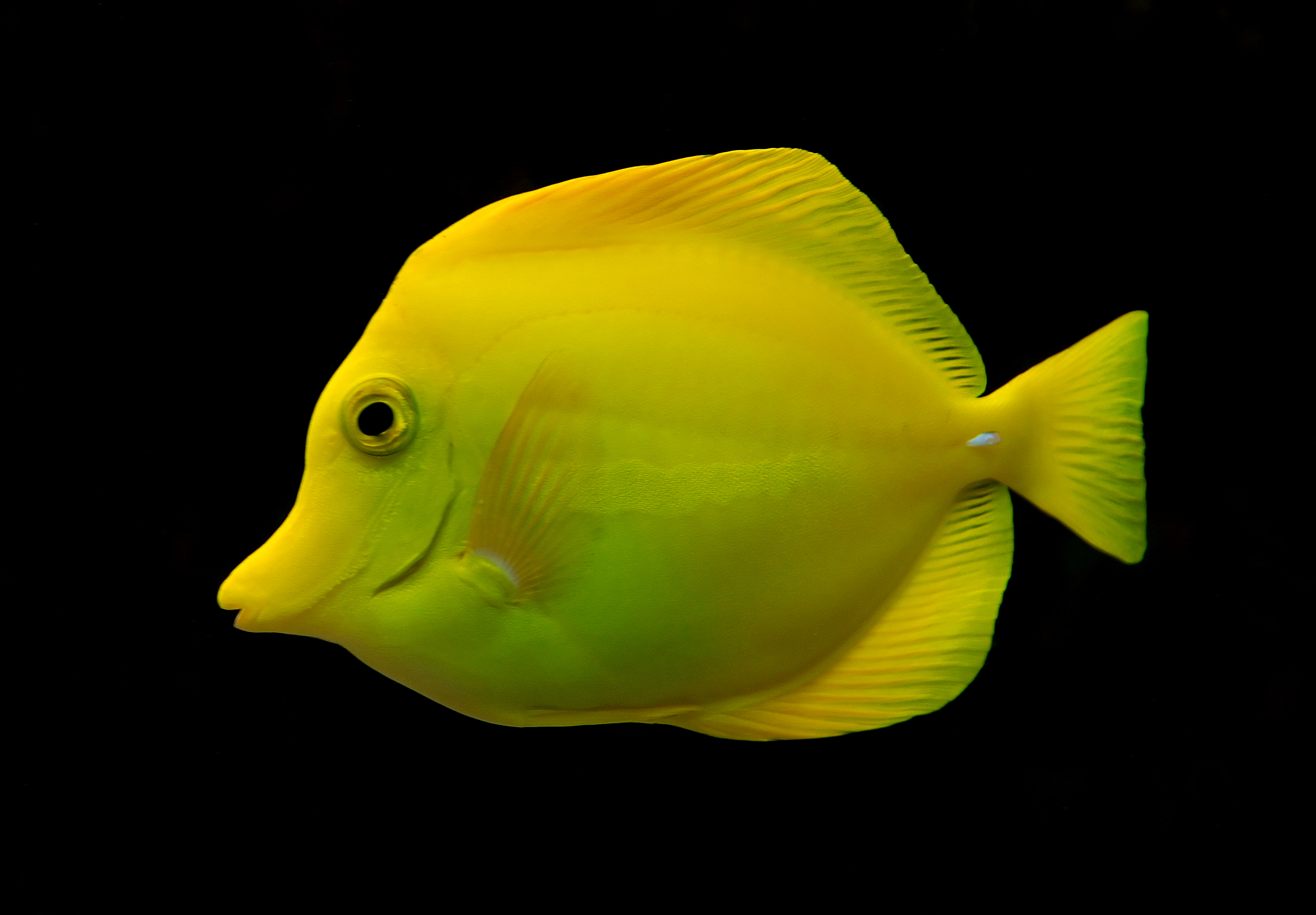
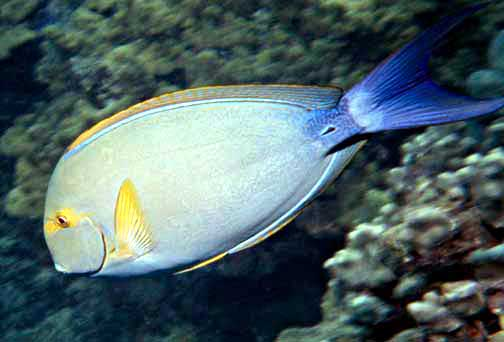
Common name	Image	Taxonomy	Reef safe	Description	Max size
Achilles tang		Acanthurus achilles	Yes	Passive aggressive. This fish is native to the waters of Hawaii and the South Pacific and therefore requires substantial turbulent flow and circulation to be kept in an aquarium. This fish should only be kept in a six-foot or large aquarium as it requires a large amount of swim room. Very prone to Cryptocaryon irritans	28 cm (11.0 in)
Atlantic blue tang		Acanthurus coeruleus	Yes	Less aggressive than Achilles or Powder Blue	16 in
Blue eyed tang		Ctenochaetus binotatus	Yes
Blue lined surgeonfish		Acanthurus nigroris	Yes
Bristletooth tang		Ctenochaetus striatus	Yes
Chevron tang		Ctenochaetus hawaiiensis	Yes	Bright orange when young and dark olive green when transitioned fully to juvenile.
Clown tang		Acanthurus lineatus	Yes	One of the most aggressive tangs	15 inches
Convict tang		Acanthurus triostegus	Yes
Desjardini tang		Zebrasoma desjardinii	Yes
Doctorfish		Acanthurus chirurgus	Yes
Dussumieri tang		Acanthurus dussumieri	Yes		53 cm (20.9 in)
Eibli mimic tang		Acanthurus tristis	Yes
Gold rim tang		Acanthurus nigricans	Yes
Regal / Hippo tang		Paracanthurus hepatus	Yes	Very prone to Cryptocaryon irritans. More tolerant of other tangs than most other species.
Kole tang		Ctenochaetus strigosus	Yes
Lavender tang		Acanthurus nigrofuscus	Yes
Lopezi tang		Naso lopezi	Yes
Mimic tang, Chocolate tang		Acanthurus pyroferus	Yes
Naso tang, blonde naso tang		Naso lituratus	Yes
Orange shoulder tang		Acanthurus olivaceus	Yes
Powder blue tang		Acanthurus leucosternon	Yes	Very prone to Cryptocaryon irritans.
Powder brown tang		Acanthurus japonicus	Yes
Purple tang		Zebrasoma xanthurum	Yes
Sailfin tang		Zebrasoma veliferum	Yes
Scopas tang		Zebrasoma scopas	Yes	Similar to the yellow tang in shape and feeding.
Sohal tang		Acanthurus sohal	Yes	One of the larger more aggressive tangs	40 cm (15.7 in)
Tennent tang		Acanthurus tennenti	Yes
Thompson's surgeonfish		Acanthurus thompsoni	Yes		28 cm (11.0 in)
Tomini tang		Ctenocheatus tominiensis	Yes	This fish requires ample swimming room and is difficult to feed.
Unicorn tang		Naso unicornis	Yes
Vlamingi tang		Naso vlamingii	Yes
White freckled surgeon		Acanthurus maculiceps	Yes
Yellow tang		Zebrasoma flavescens	Yes
Yellowfin surgeon		Acanthurus xanthopterus	Yes

== Tilefish ==
Though often categorized as gobies, tilefish are a separate species.

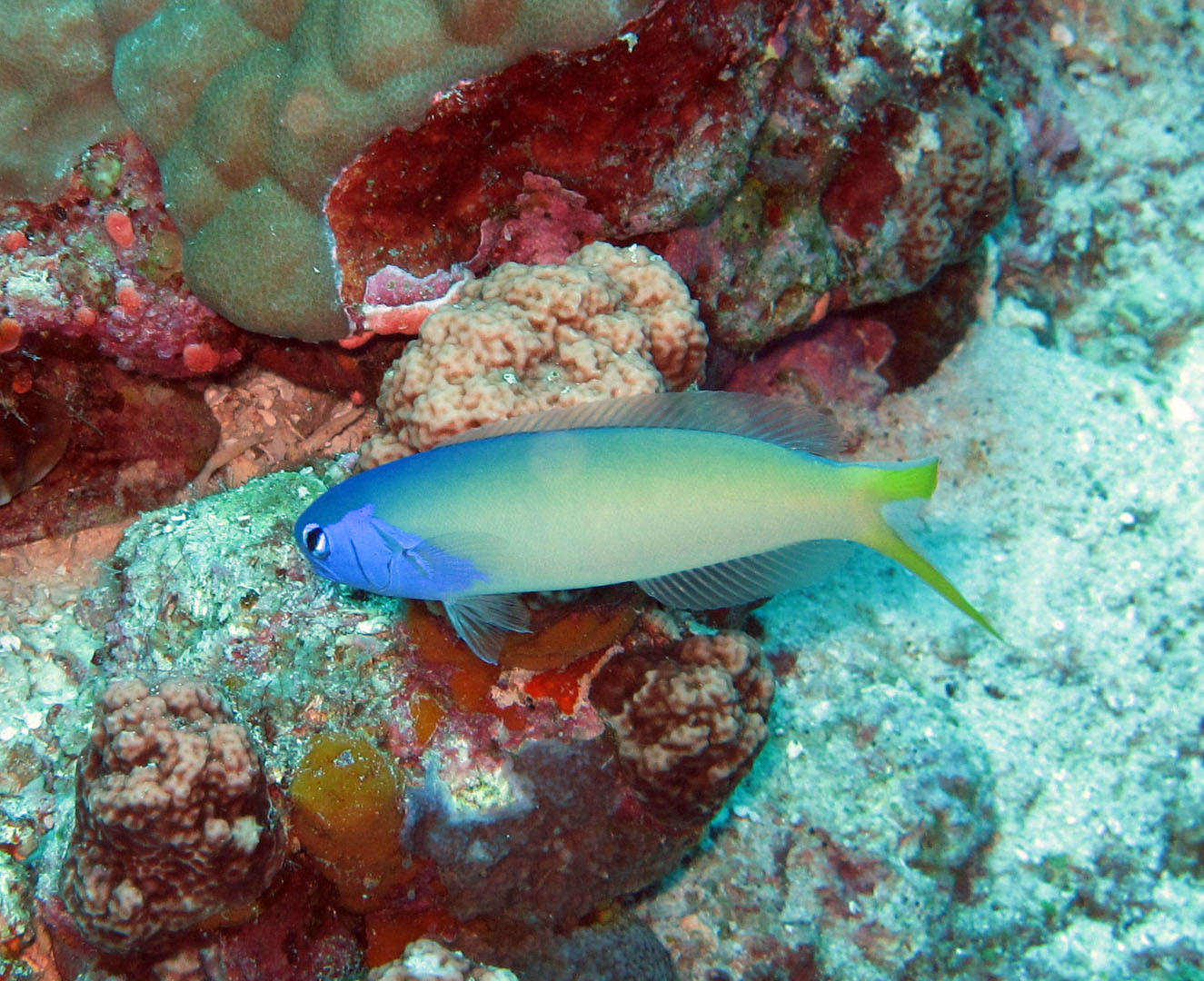
Common name	Image	Taxonomy	Reef safe	Description	Max size
Blue-headed tilefish		Hoplolatilus starcki			10 cm (3.9 in)
Purple tilefish		Hoplolatilus purpureus			15 cm (5.9 in)
Yellow tilefish		Hoplolatilus luteus			15 cm (5.9 in)
Redlined tilefish		Hoplolatilus marcosi

== Triggerfish ==
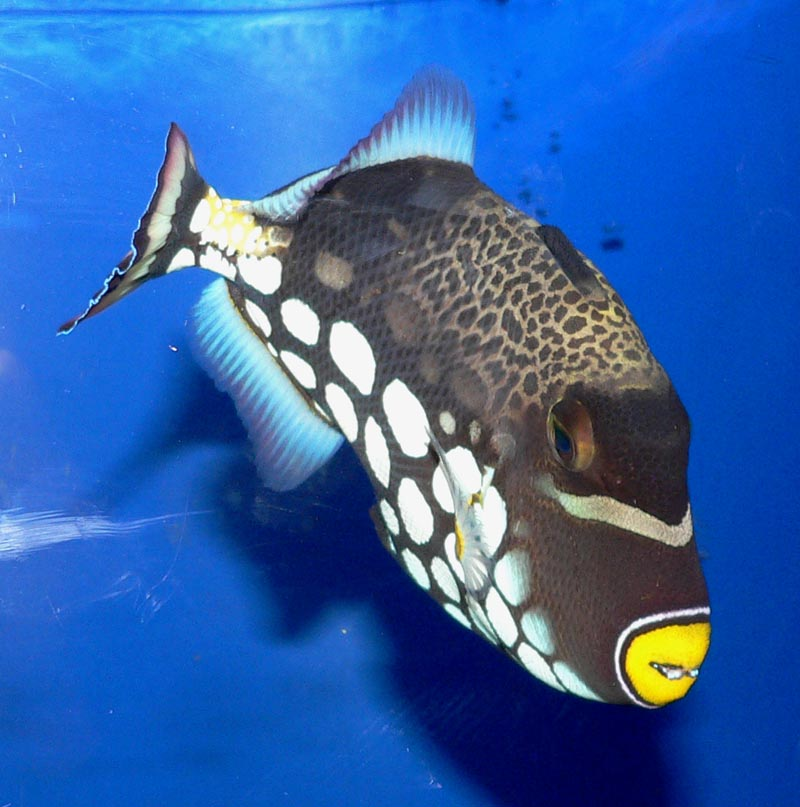
Clown trigger

While they are generally considered monsters that will chomp invertebrates, a few species can make great reef fish. Other more aggressive species such as the undulated trigger, and clown trigger will sometimes be so aggressive that it is necessary to keep as the sole inhabitant of the aquarium. All will require large tanks, with good filtration.

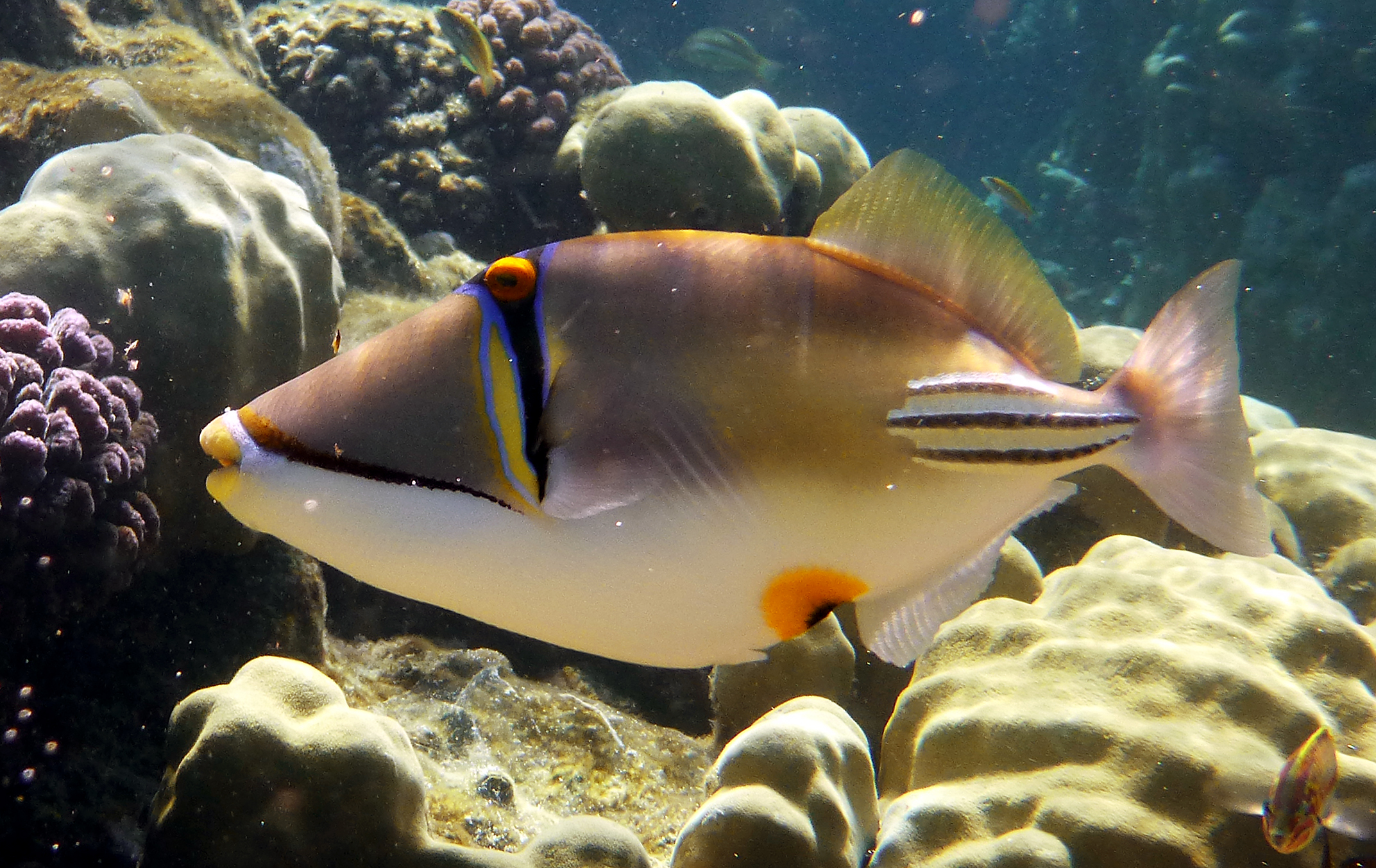
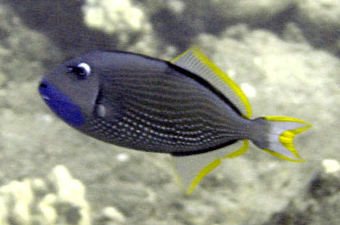
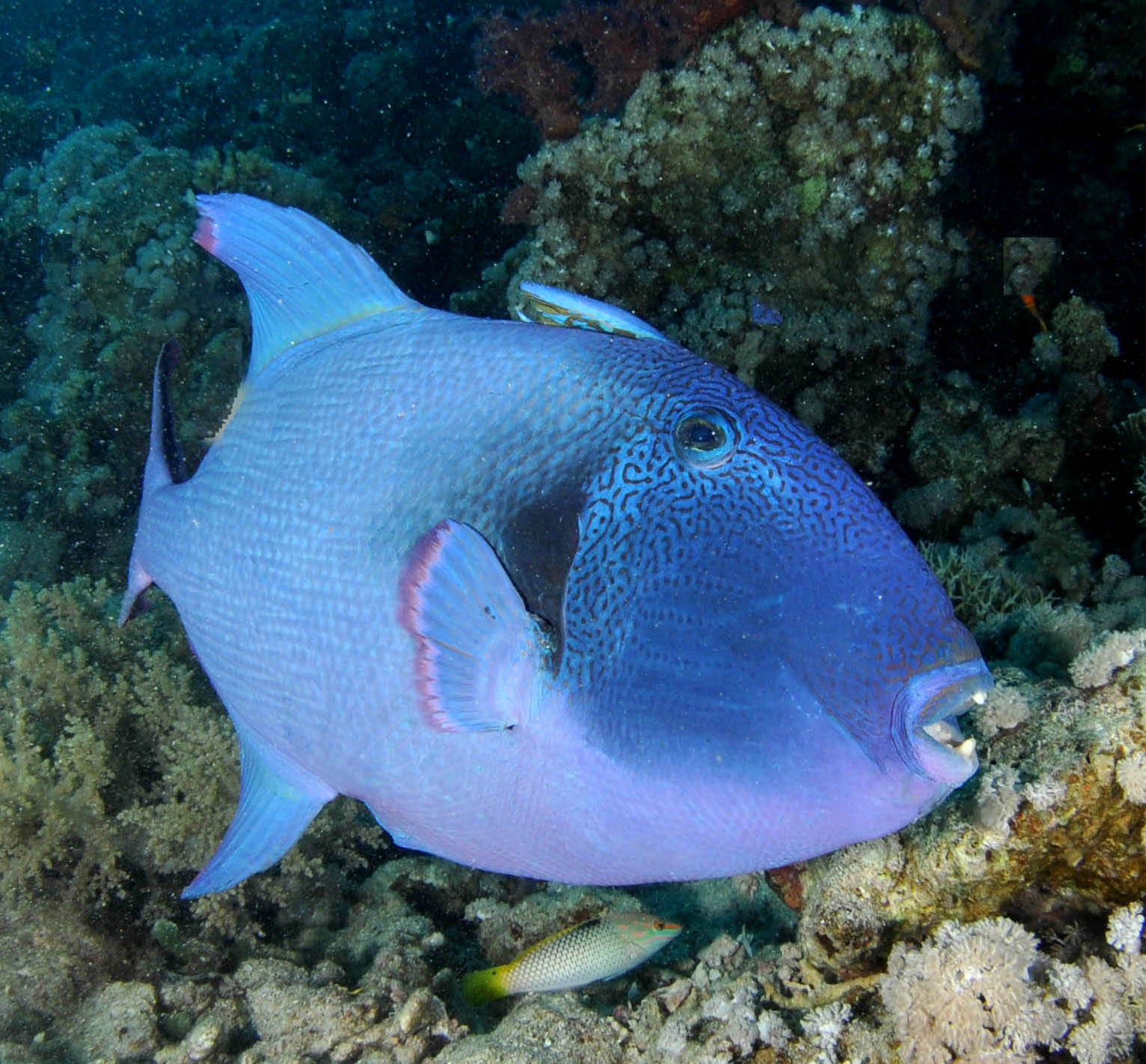
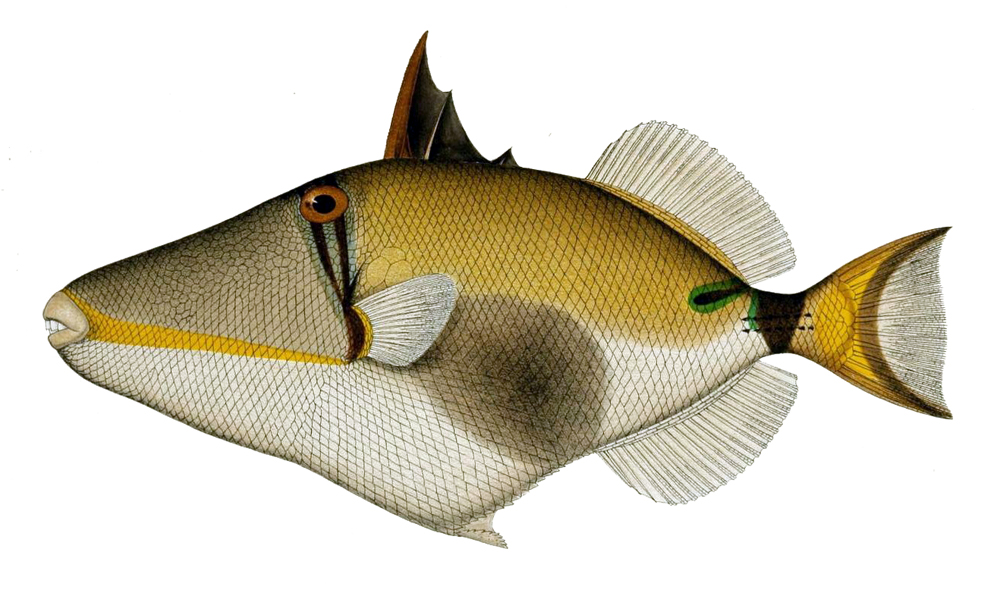
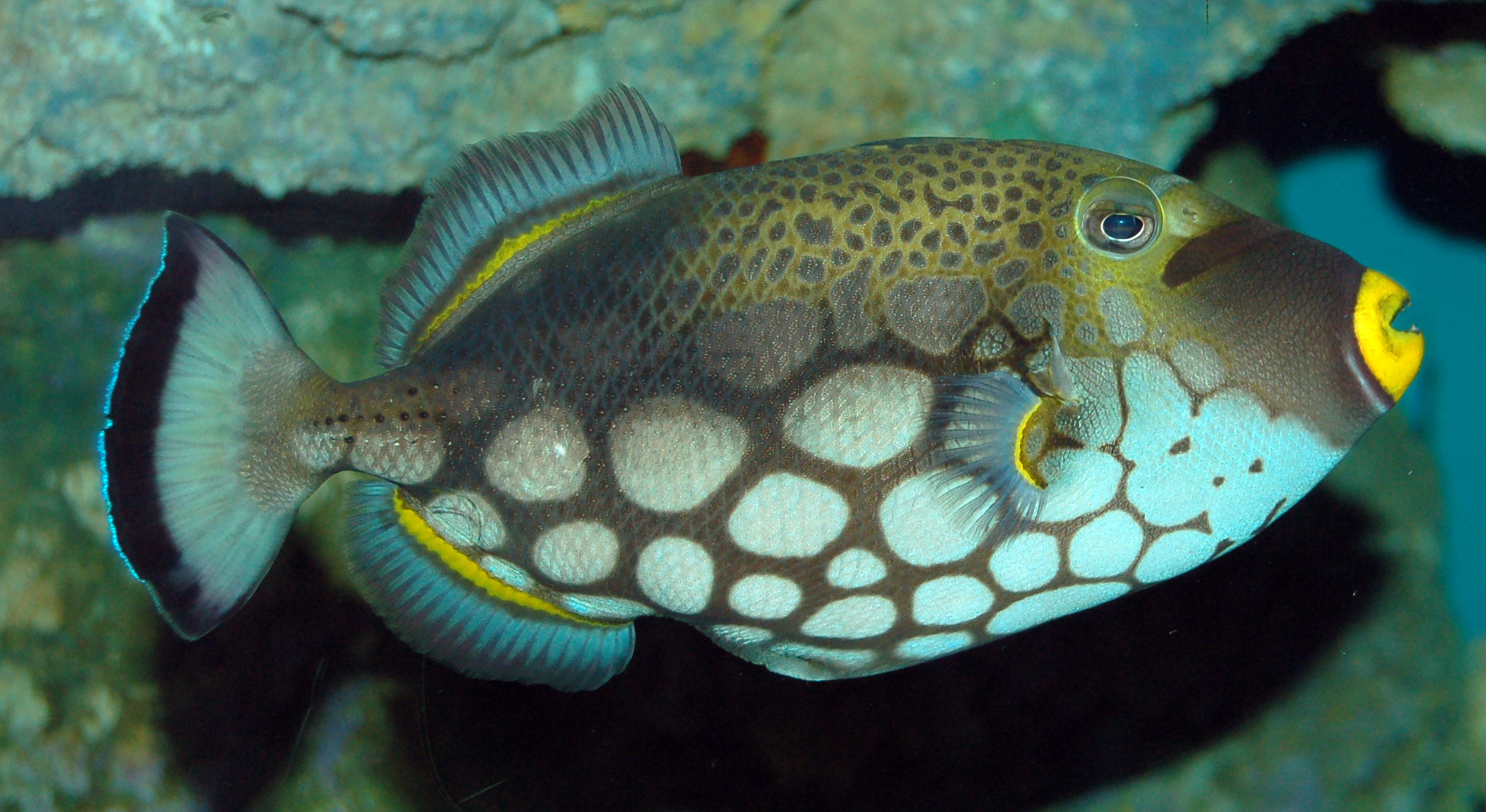
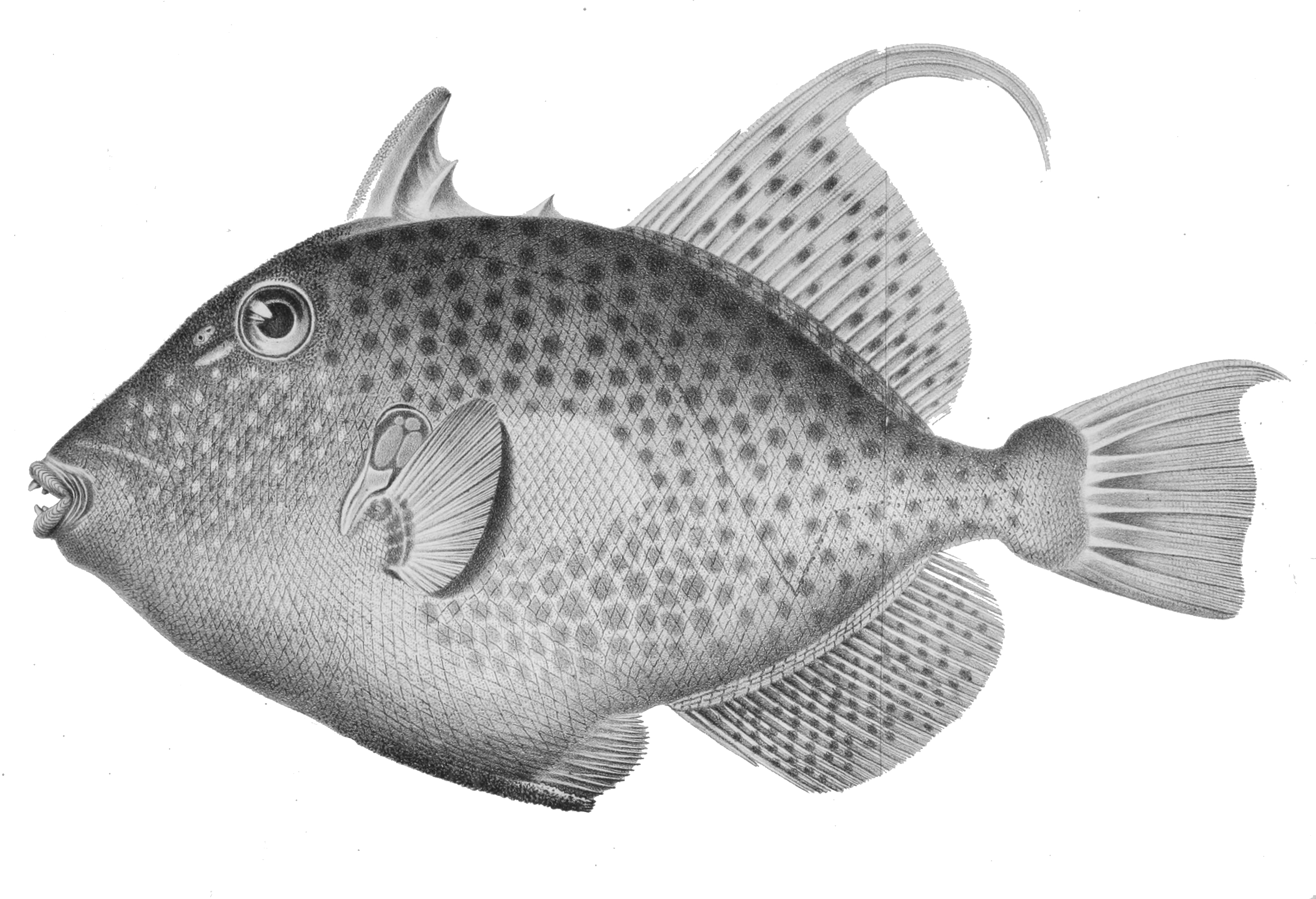
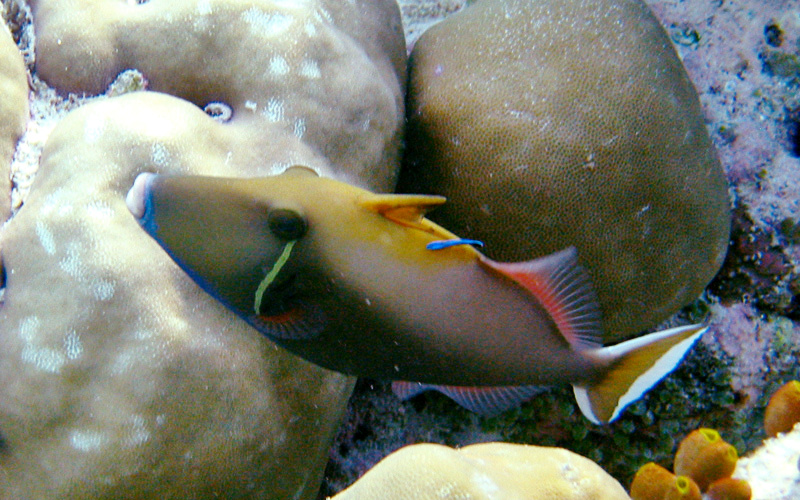
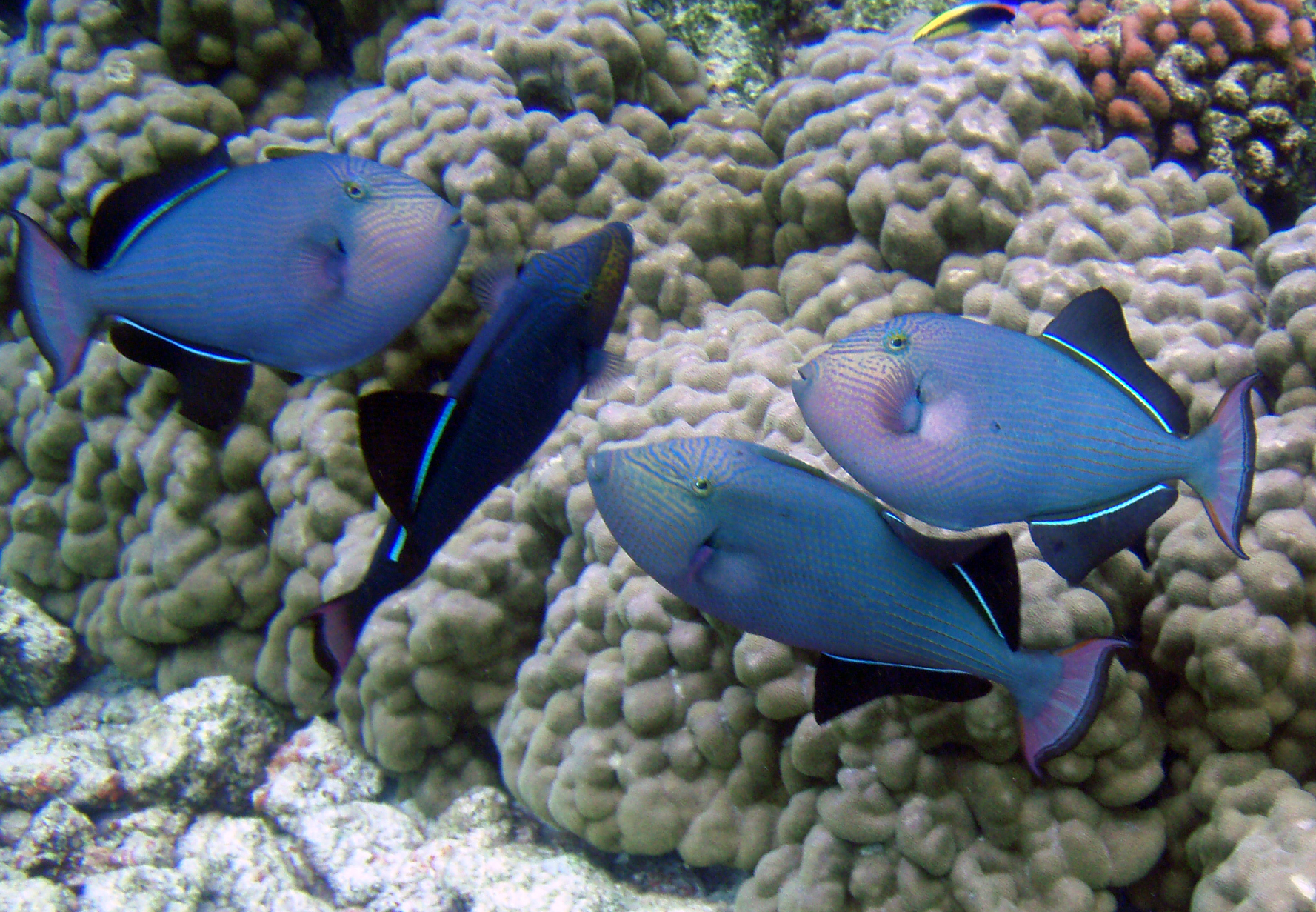
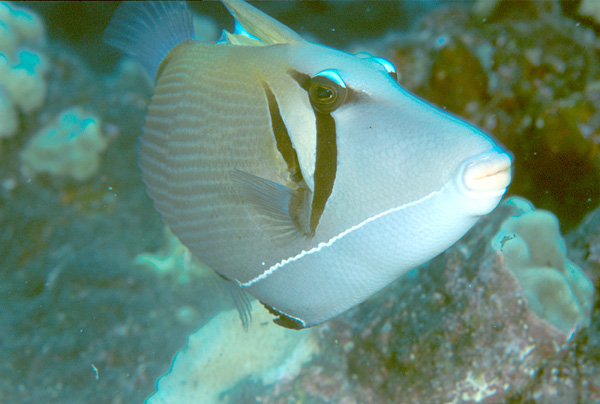
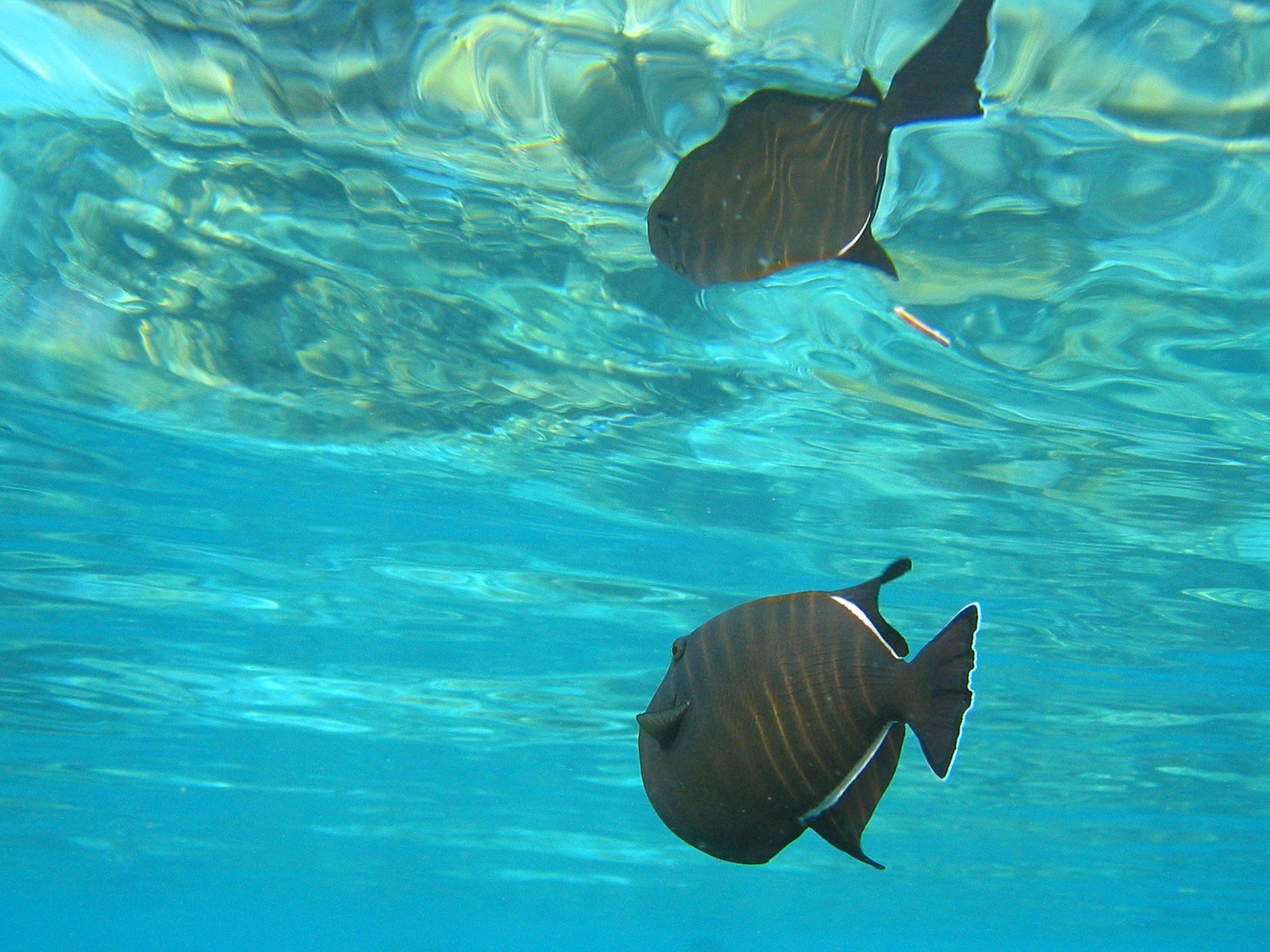
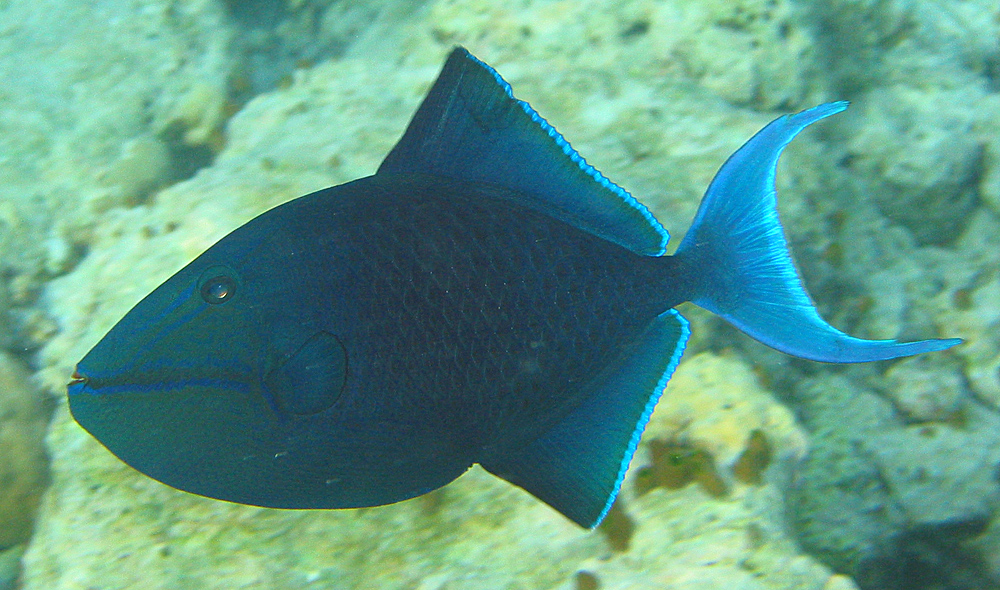
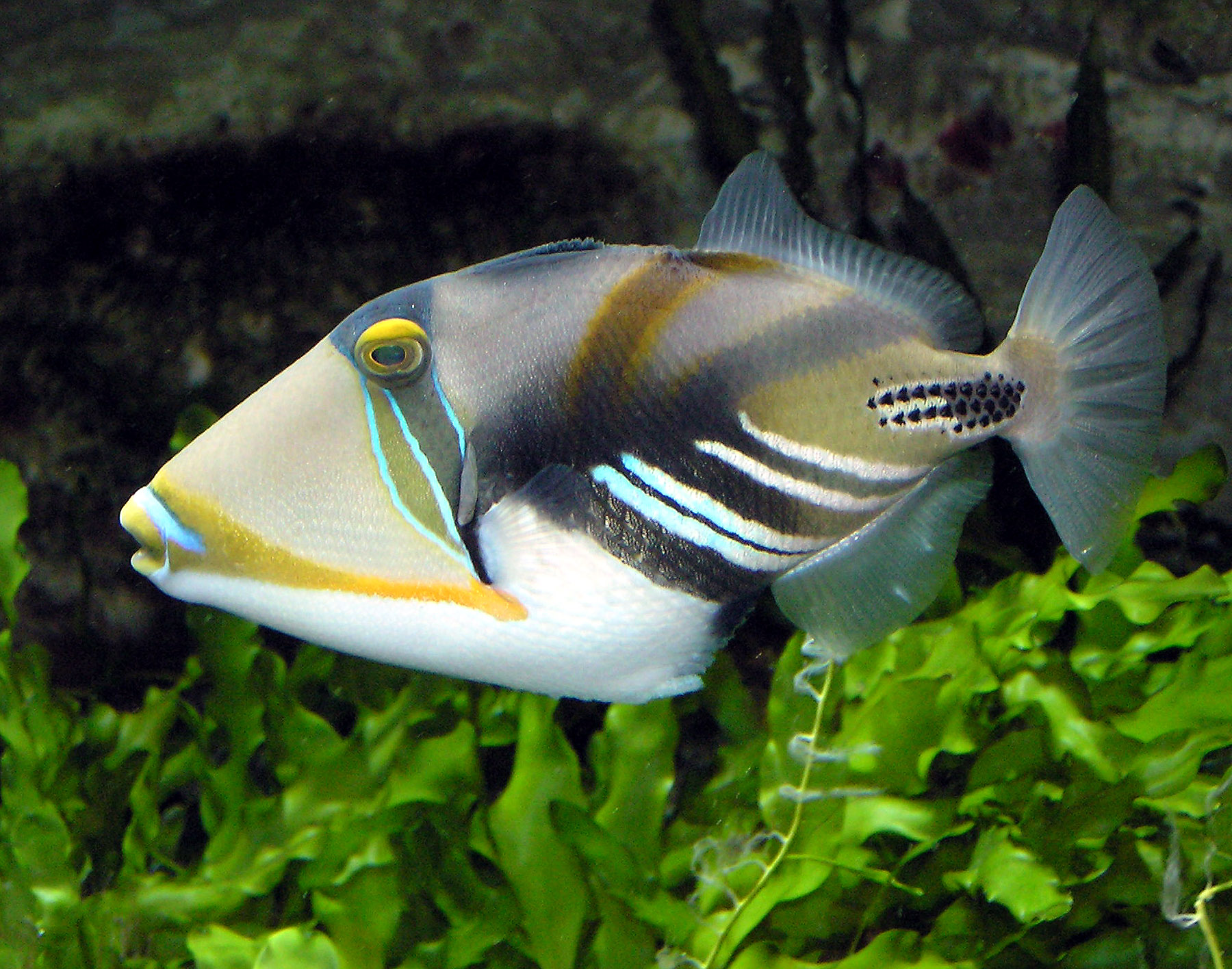
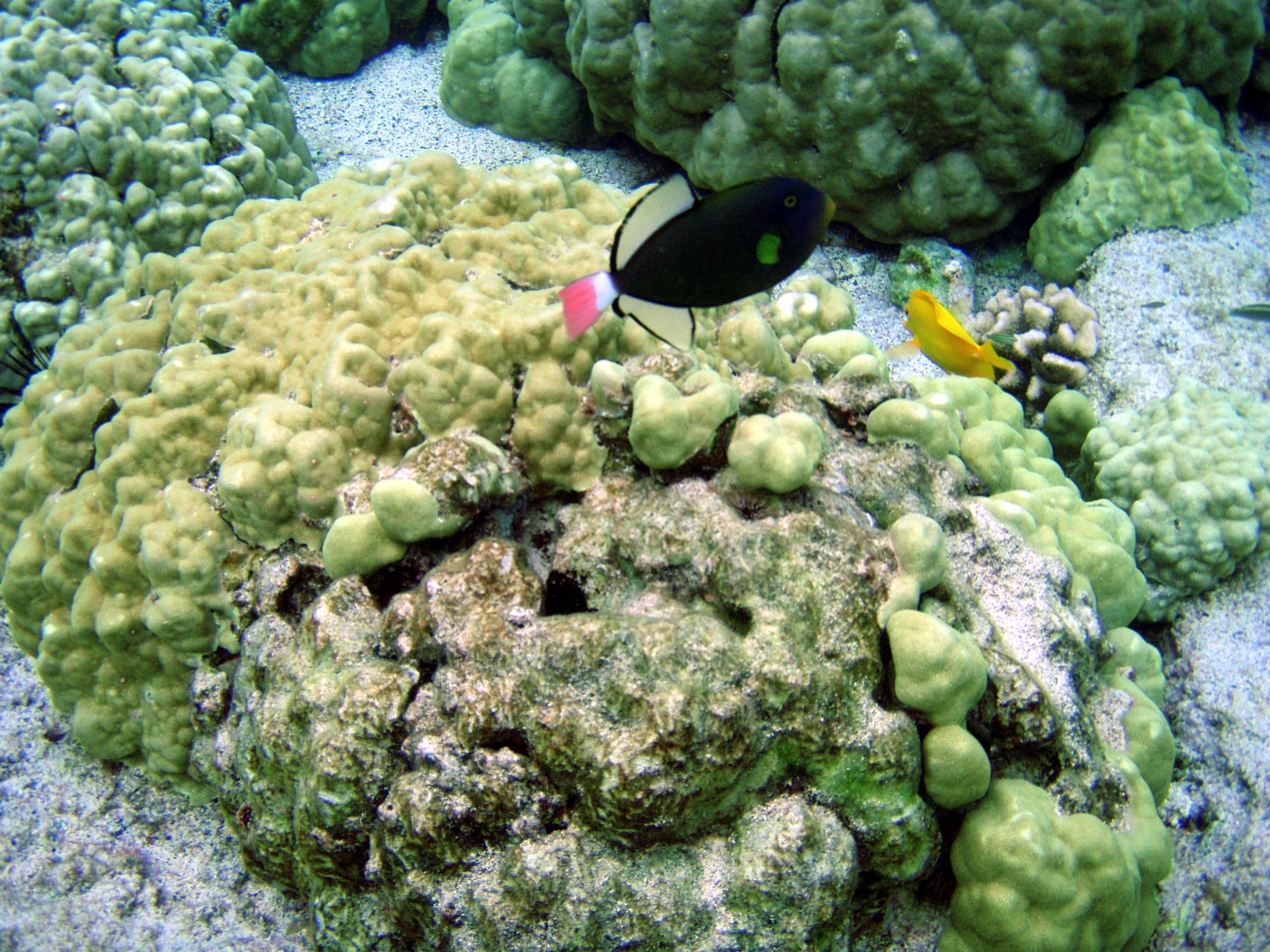
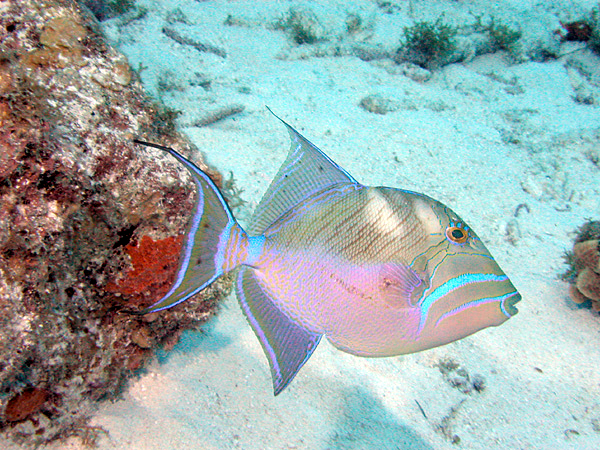
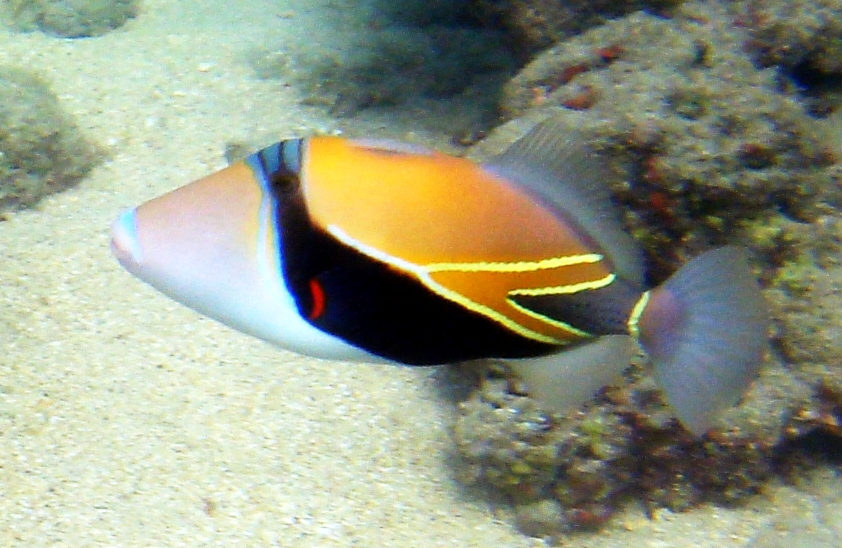
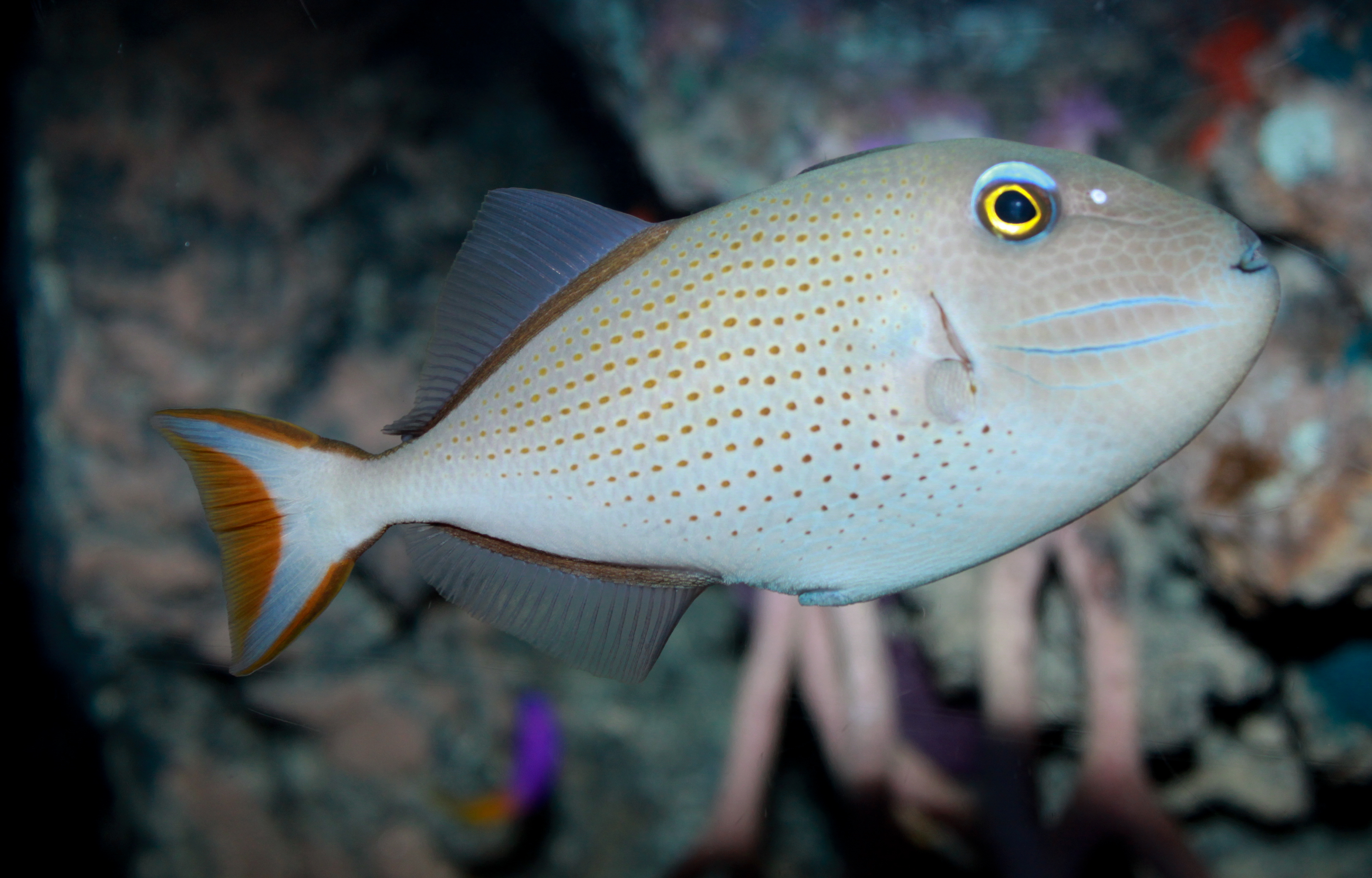
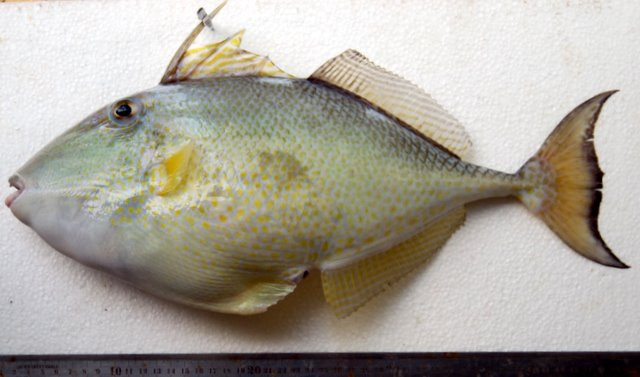
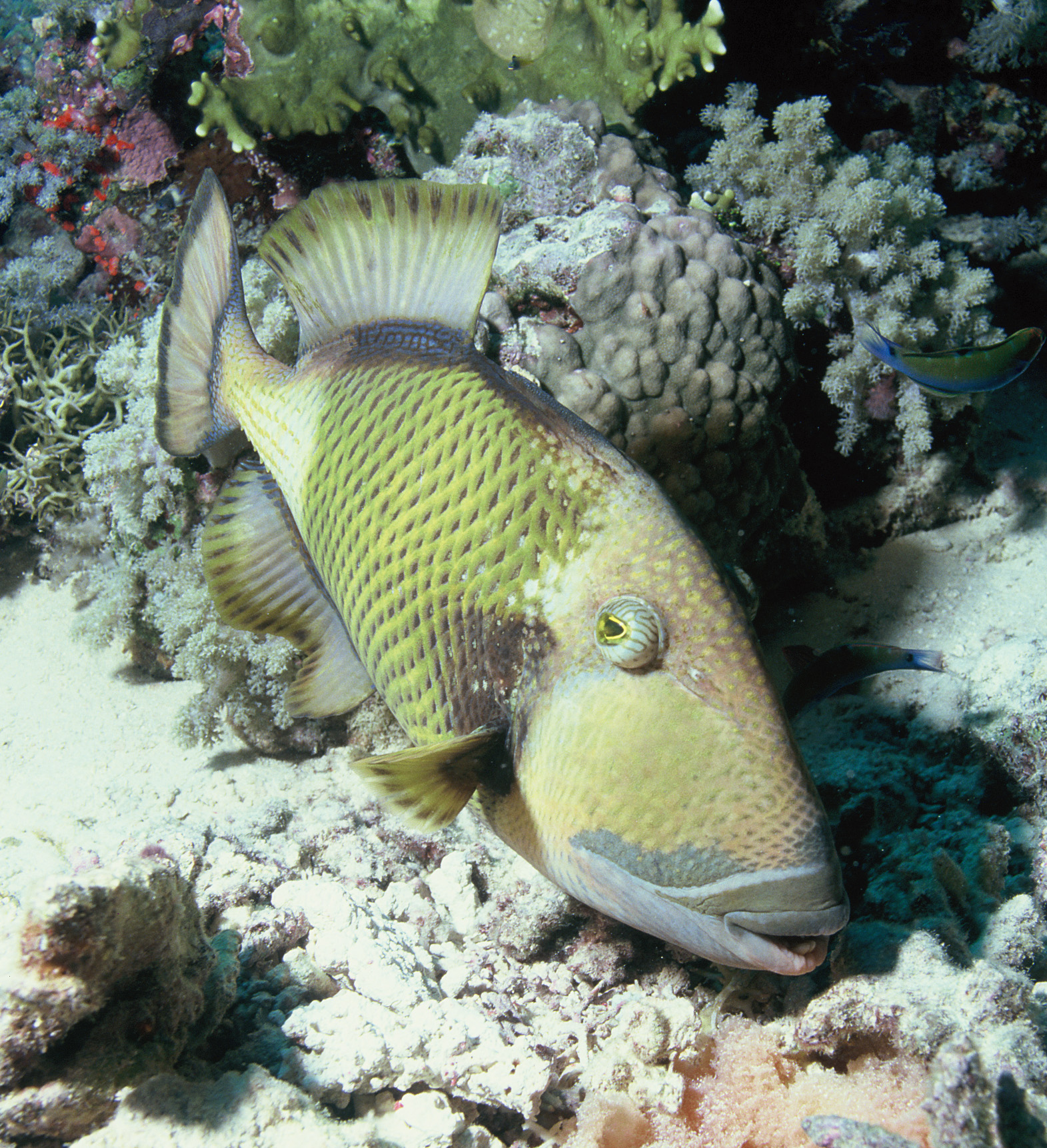
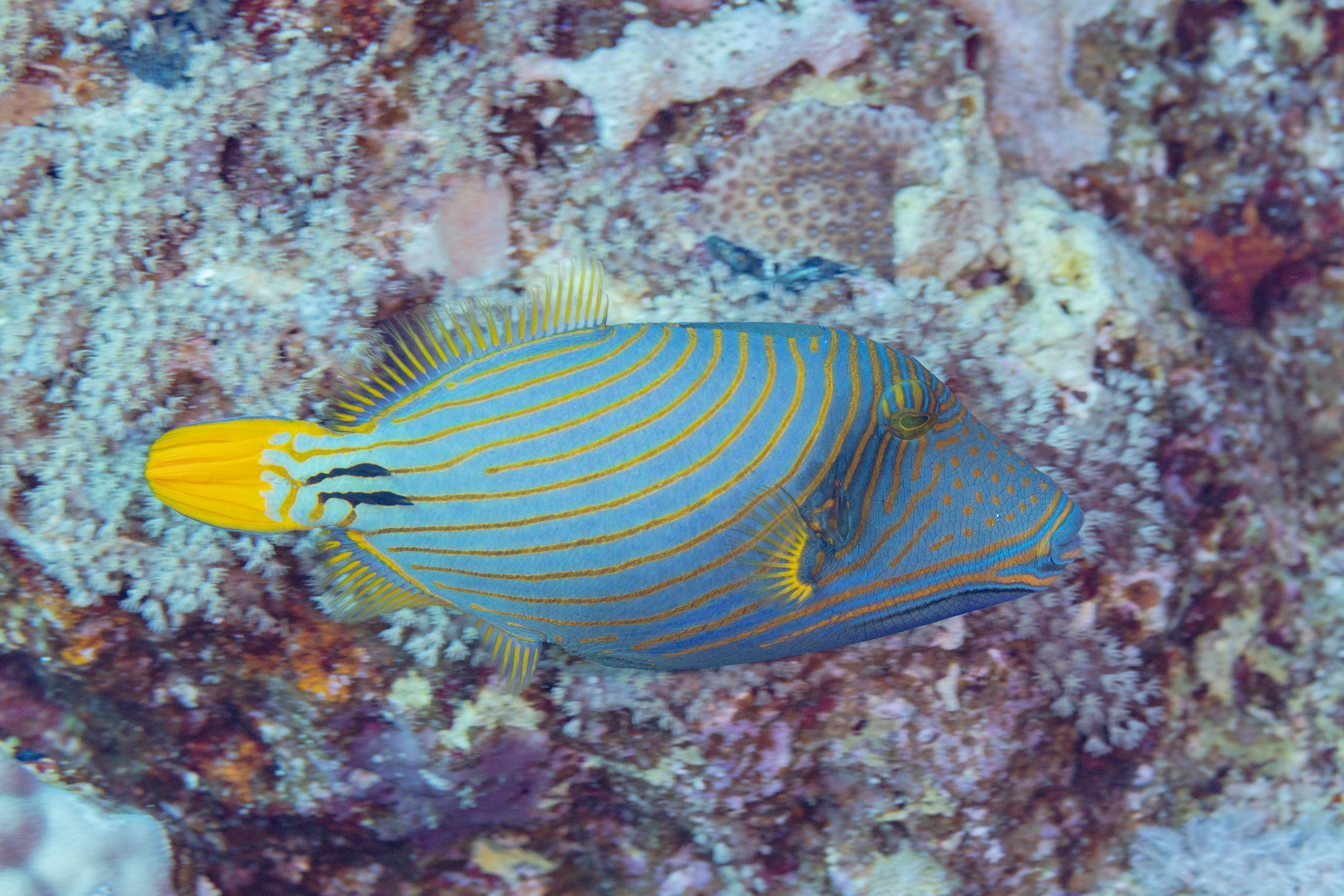
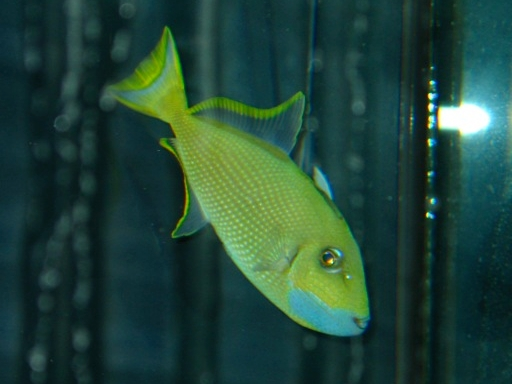
Common name	Image	Taxonomy	Reef safe	Description	Max size
Assasi trigger		Rhinecanthus assasi	No		30 cm (11.8 in)
Blue jaw trigger / blue throat trigger		Xanthichthys auromarginatus	Widely regarded as the only reef safe trigger.		30 cm (11.8 in)
Blue line trigger		Pseudobalistes fuscus	No		55 cm (21.7 in)
Bursa trigger		Rhinecanthus verrucosus	No		23 cm (9.1 in)
Clown trigger		Balistoides conspicillum	No		50 cm (19.7 in)
Crosshatch trigger		Xanthichthys mento	No	A shy reserved fish when first added to the aquarium, comes into its own when it associates itself with the aquarist. Infrequently available	29 cm (11.4 in)
Goldenback trigger		Xanthichthys caeruleolineatus	No	Rarely available	35 cm (13.8 in)
Golden heart trigger		Balistes punctatus	No		61 cm (24.0 in)
Halfmoon trigger		Sufflamen chrysopterum	No		30 cm (11.8 in)
Hawaiian black trigger		Melichthys niger	No		50 cm (19.7 in)
Lei trigger		Sufflamen bursa	No		25 cm (9.8 in)
Indian black trigger		Melichthys indicus	No		25 cm (9.8 in)
Niger trigger		Odonus niger	No	Among the more peaceful of triggers, can usually be kept in a community tank	50 cm (19.7 in)
Picasso trigger		Rhinecanthus aculeatus	No		30 cm (11.8 in)
Pinktail trigger		Melichthys vidua	No		40 cm (15.7 in)
Queen trigger		Balistes vetula	No	A large fish that should only be kept in very large aquariums.	60 cm (23.6 in)
Rectangular trigger		Rhinecanthus rectangulus	No		30 cm (11.8 in)
Sargassum trigger		Xanthichthys ringens	No	A shy reserved fish when first added to the aquarium, comes into its own when it associates itself with the aquarist. Infrequently available	25 cm (9.8 in)
Starry trigger		Abalistes stellatus	No		60 cm (23.6 in)
Titan trigger		Balistoides viridescens	No	Can only be housed in the largest of marine aquariums	75 cm (29.5 in)
Undulated trigger		Balistapus undulatus	No	Probably the most aggressive fish kept in marine aquariums. Older specimens should be housed alone.	30 cm (11.8 in)
Whitetail trigger		Sufflamen albicaudatum	With Caution		22 cm (8.7 in)

== Wrasse ==
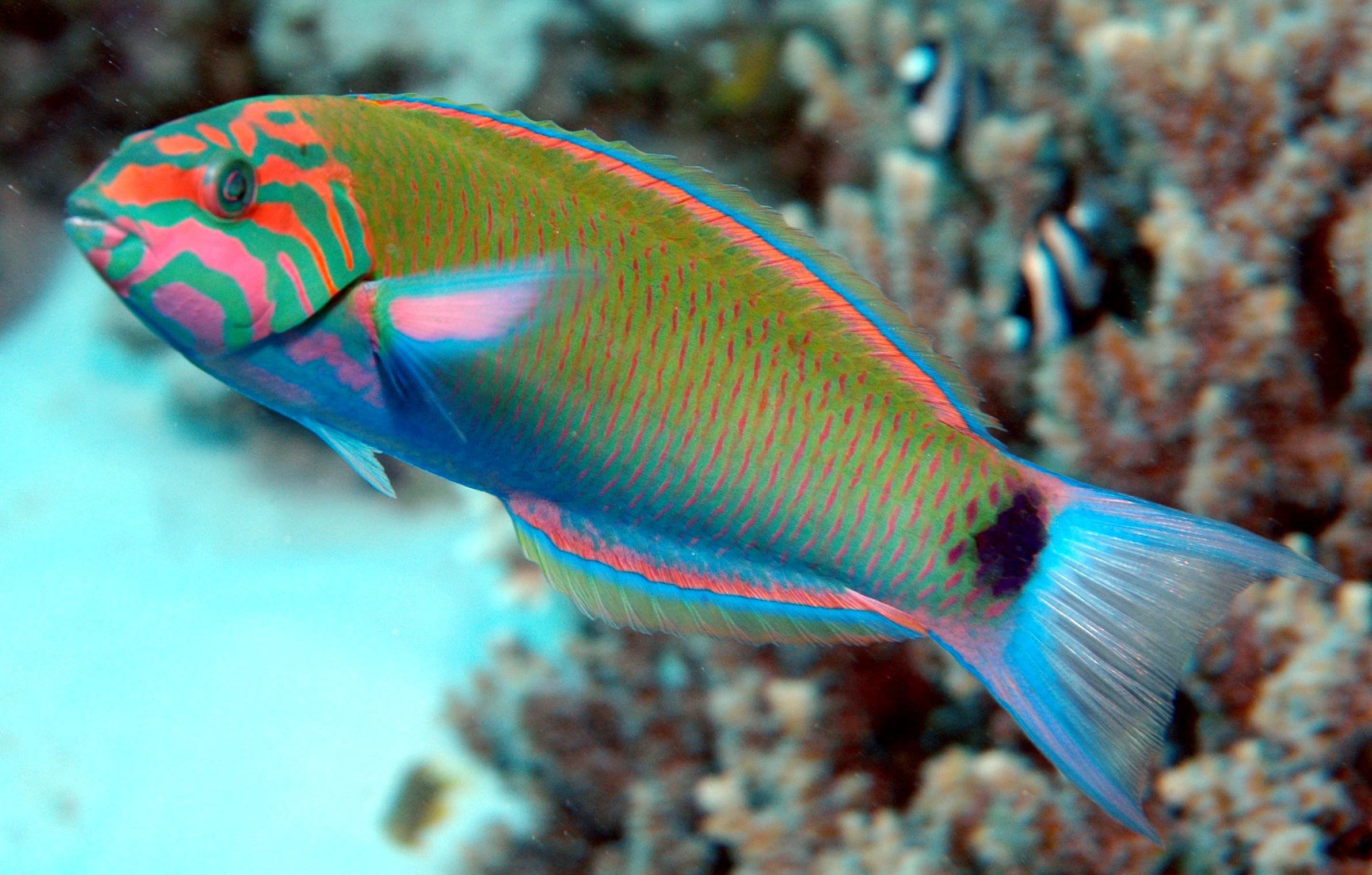
Moon wrasse

A diverse group of fish with an equally wide range of characteristics. Some wrasse species are aggressive towards small fish and invertebrates, others are reef safe. Some are quite hardy, some typically die within weeks.

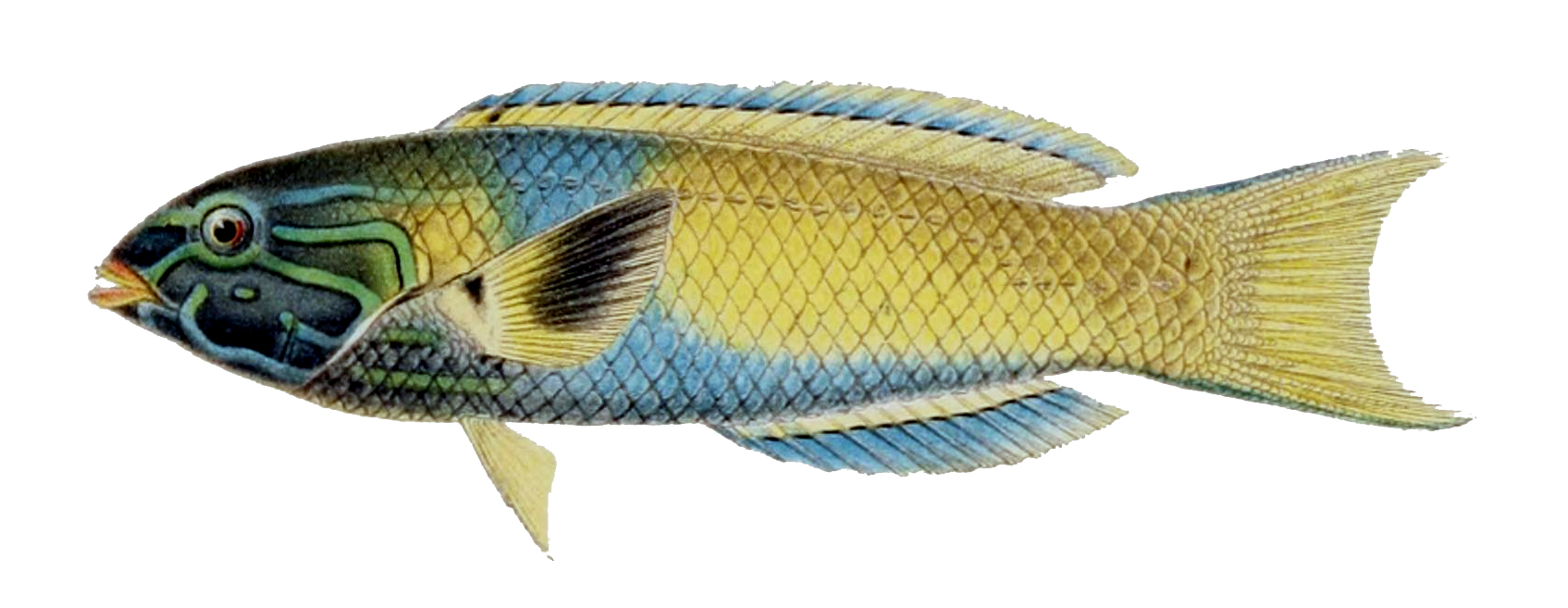
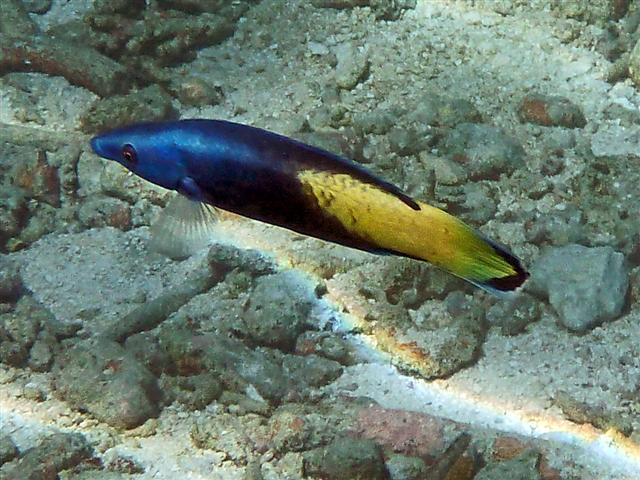
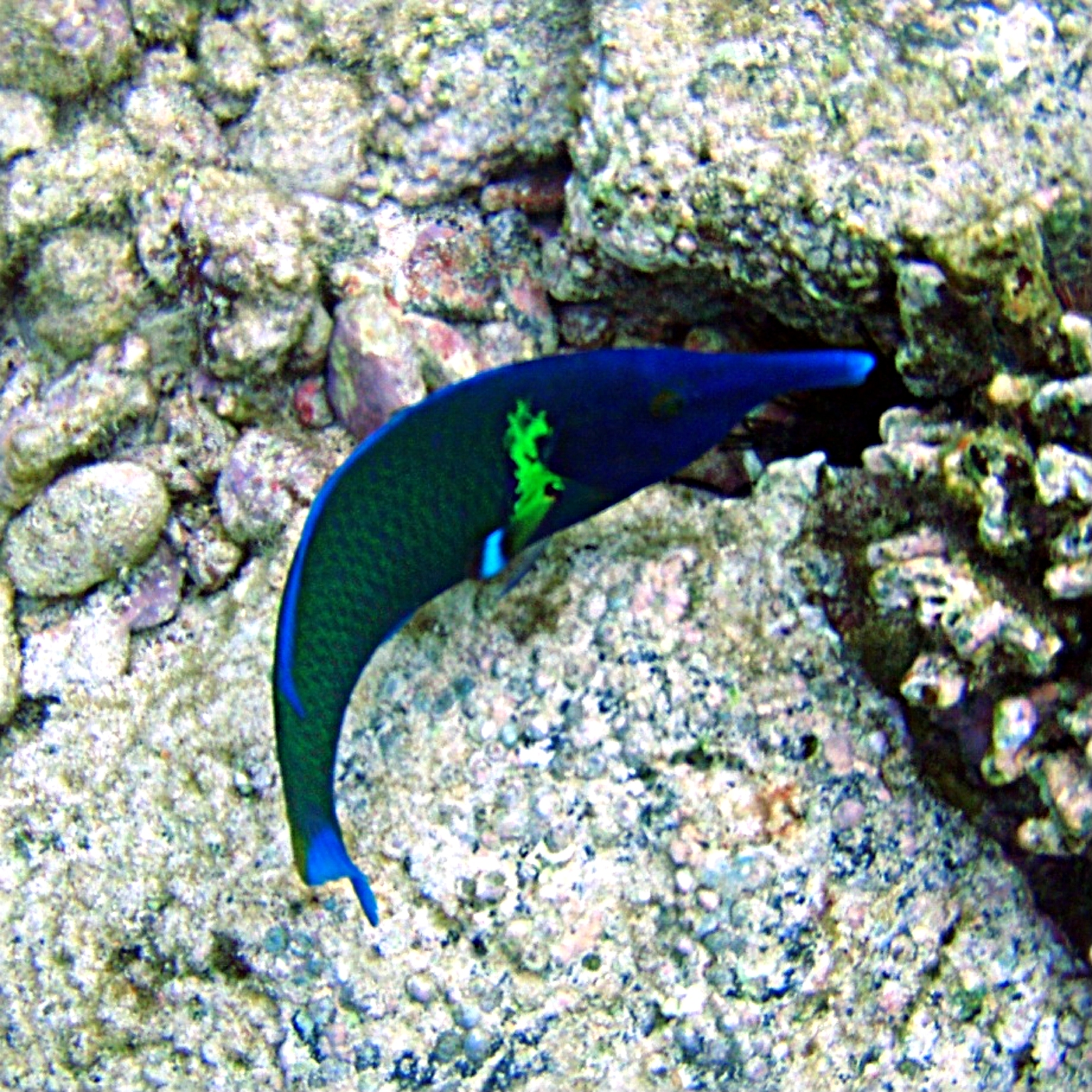
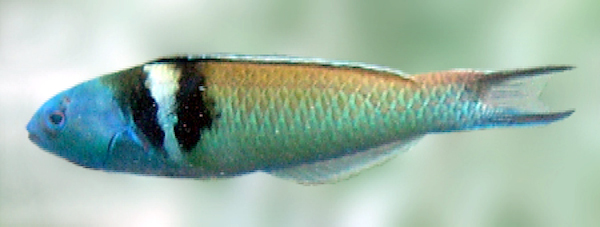
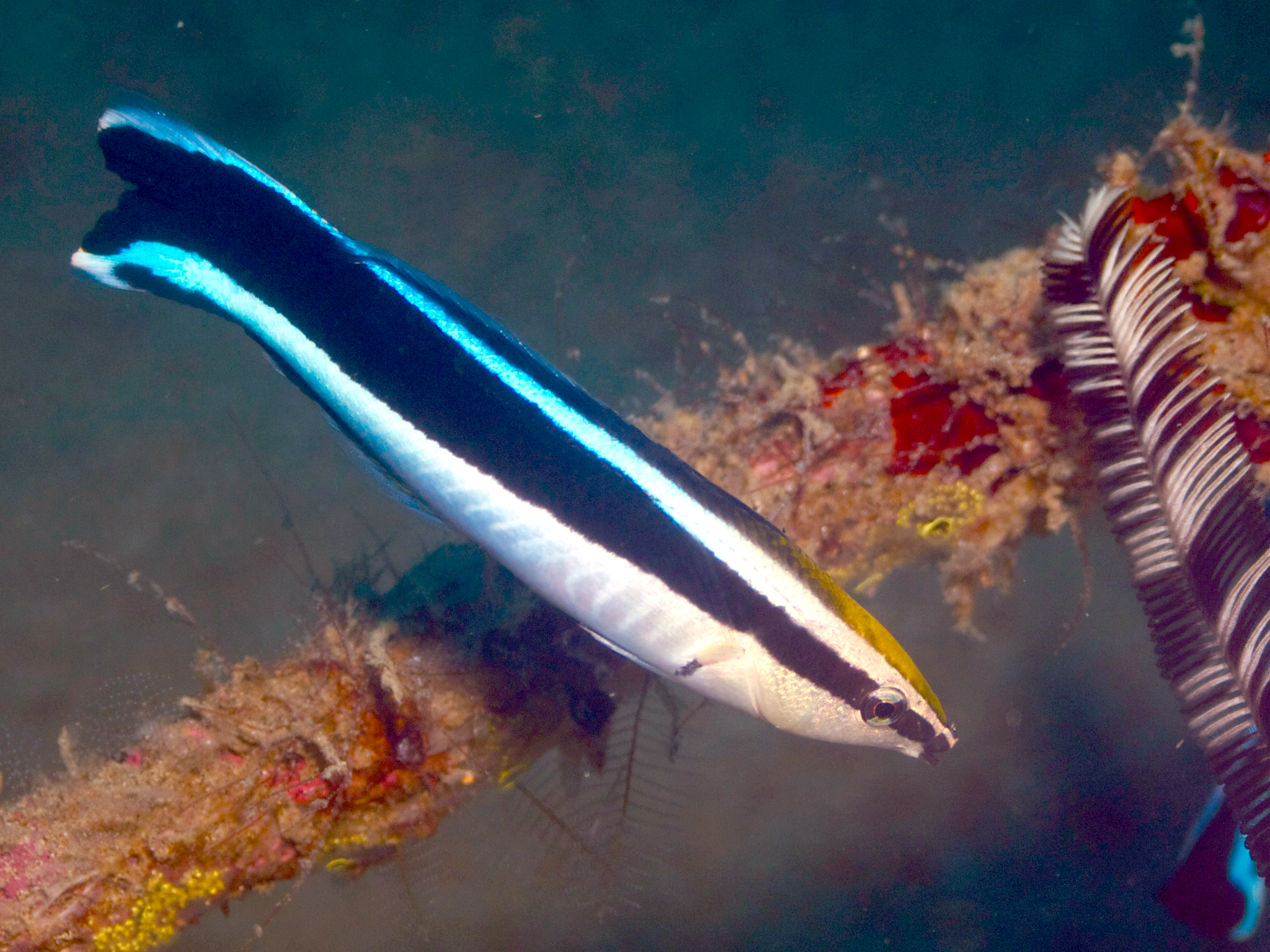
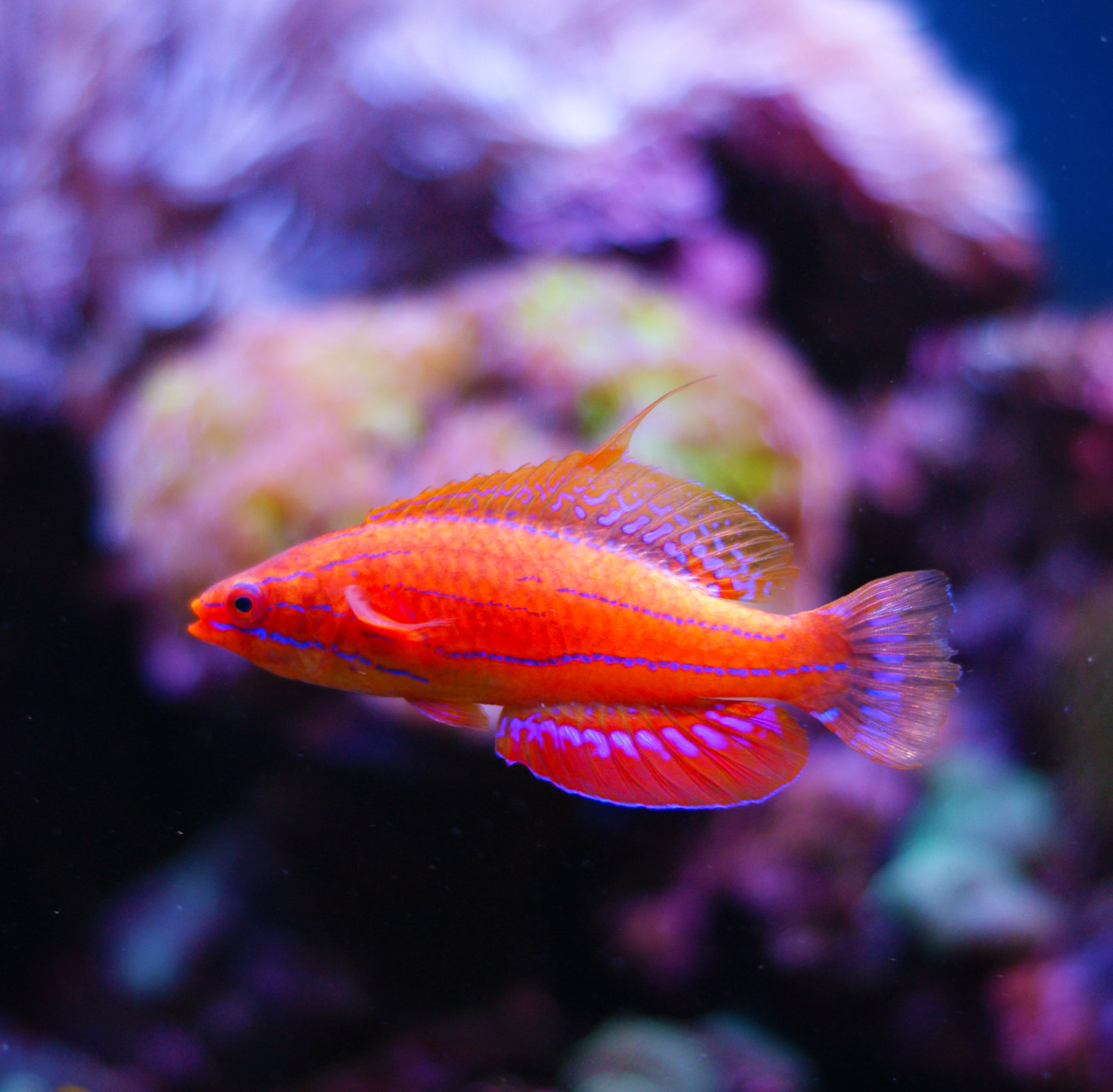
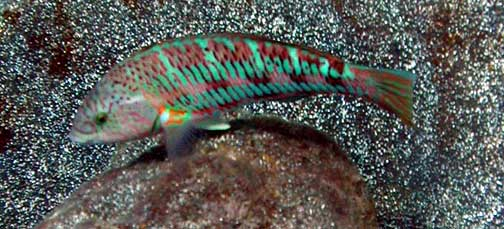
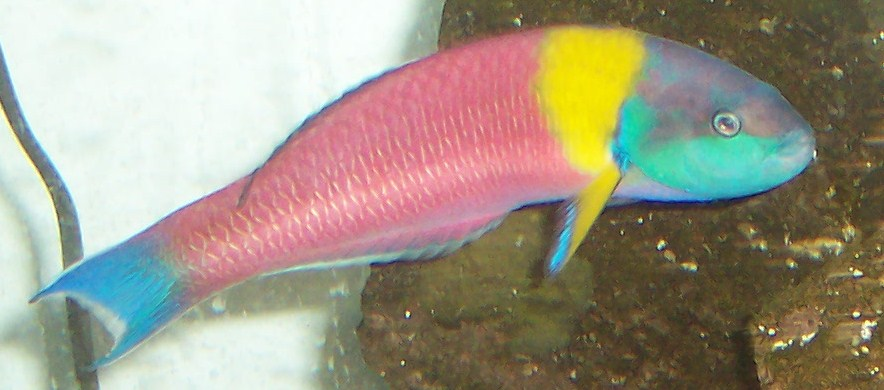
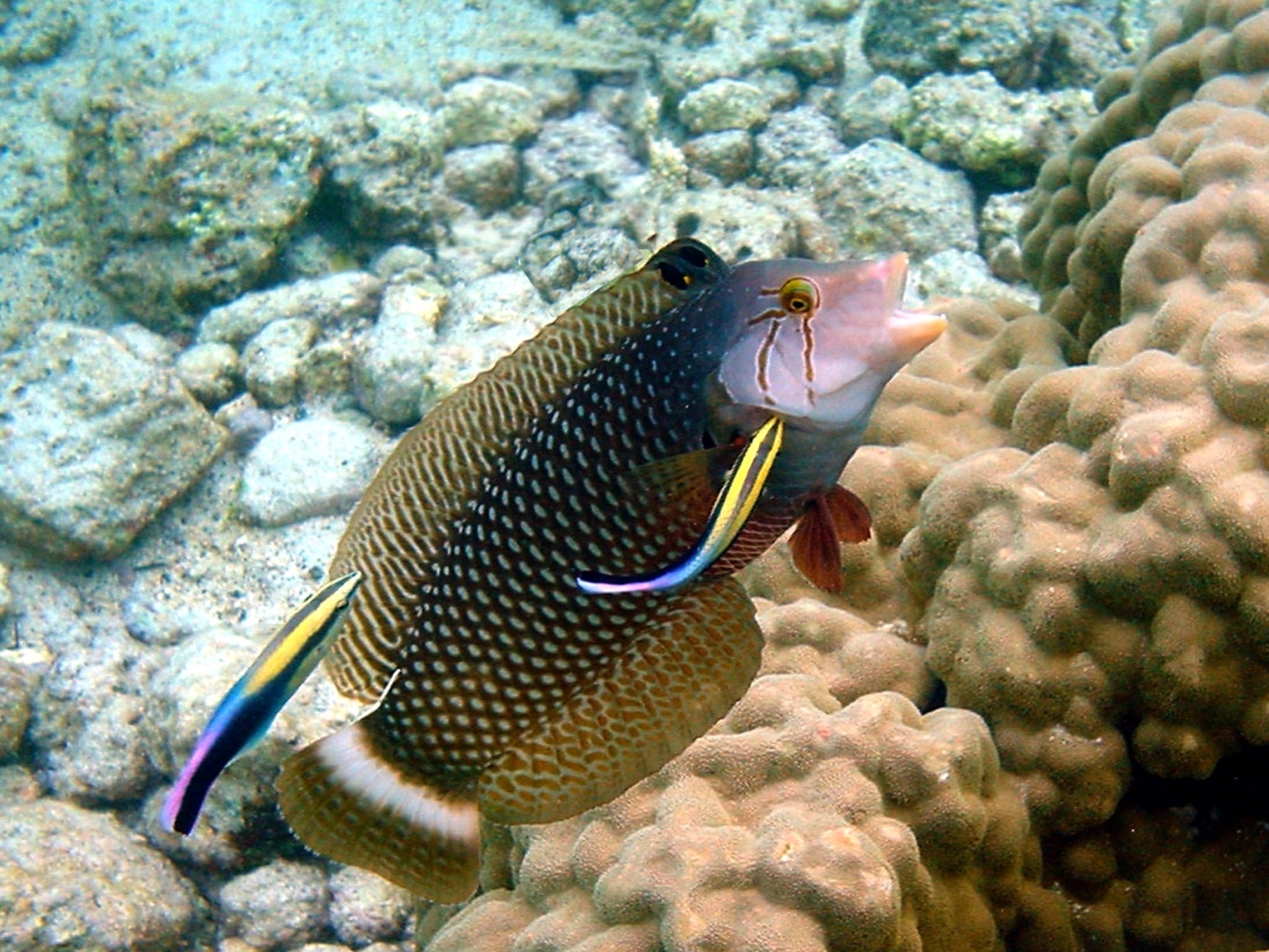
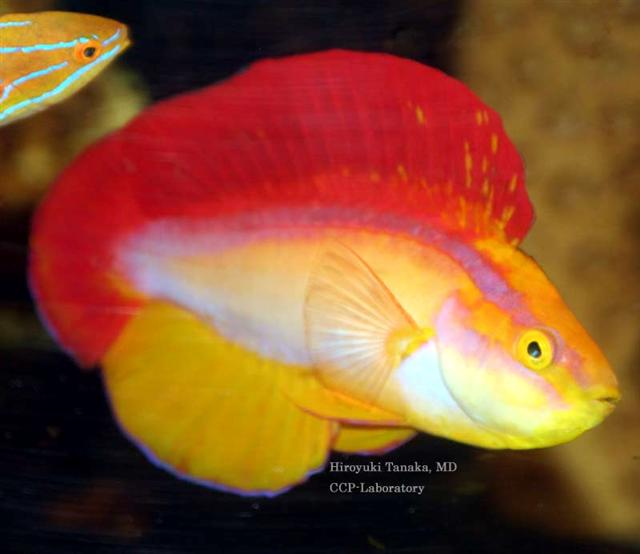
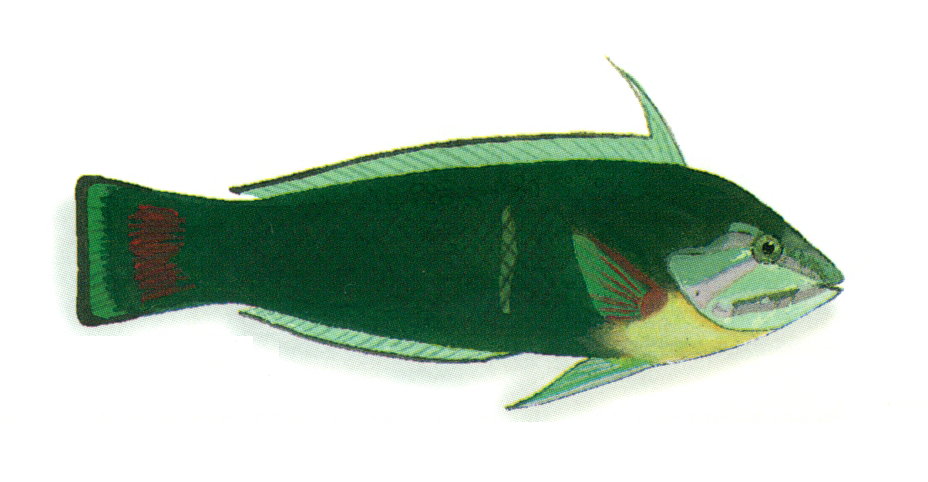
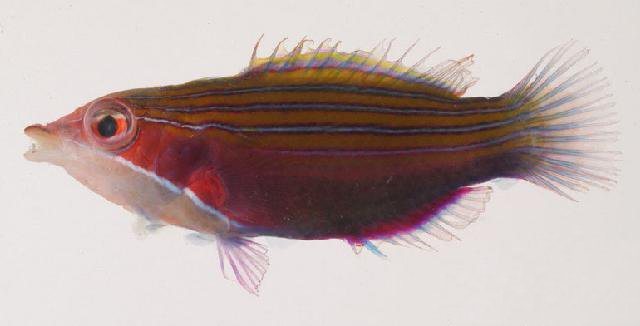
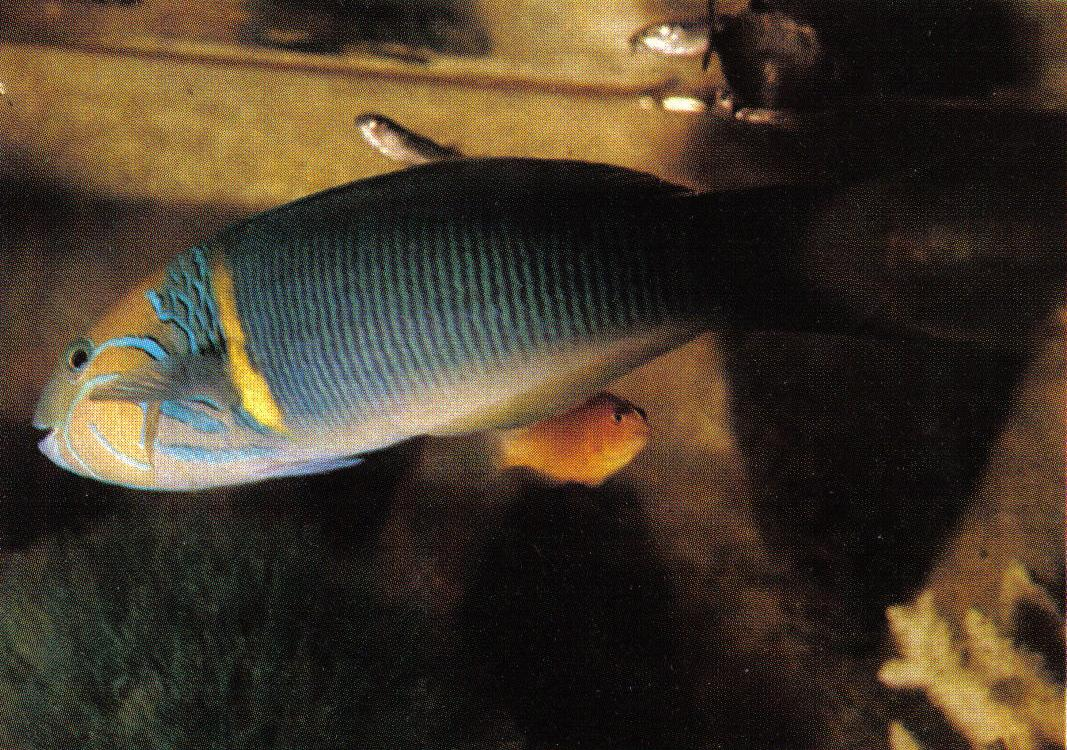
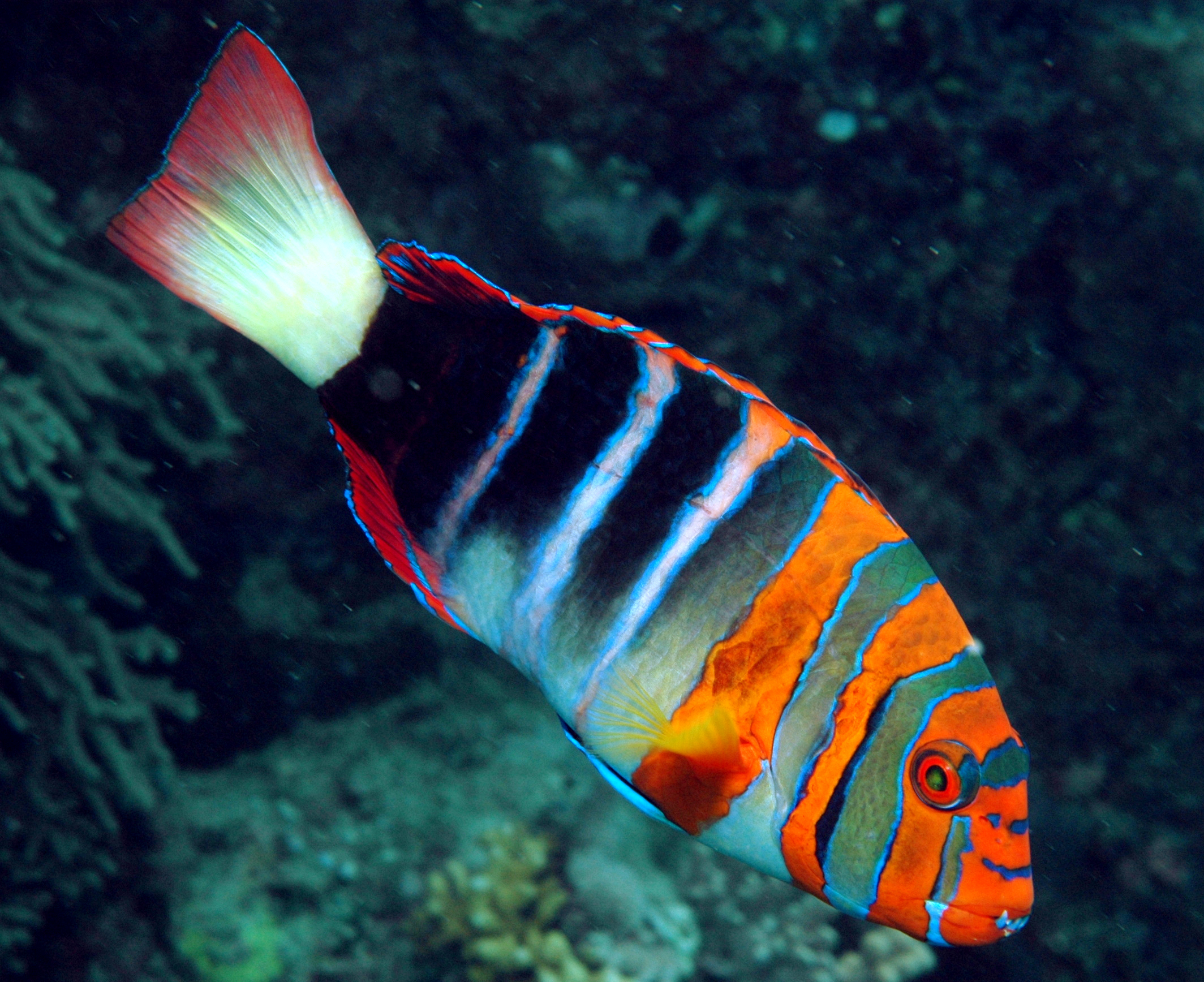
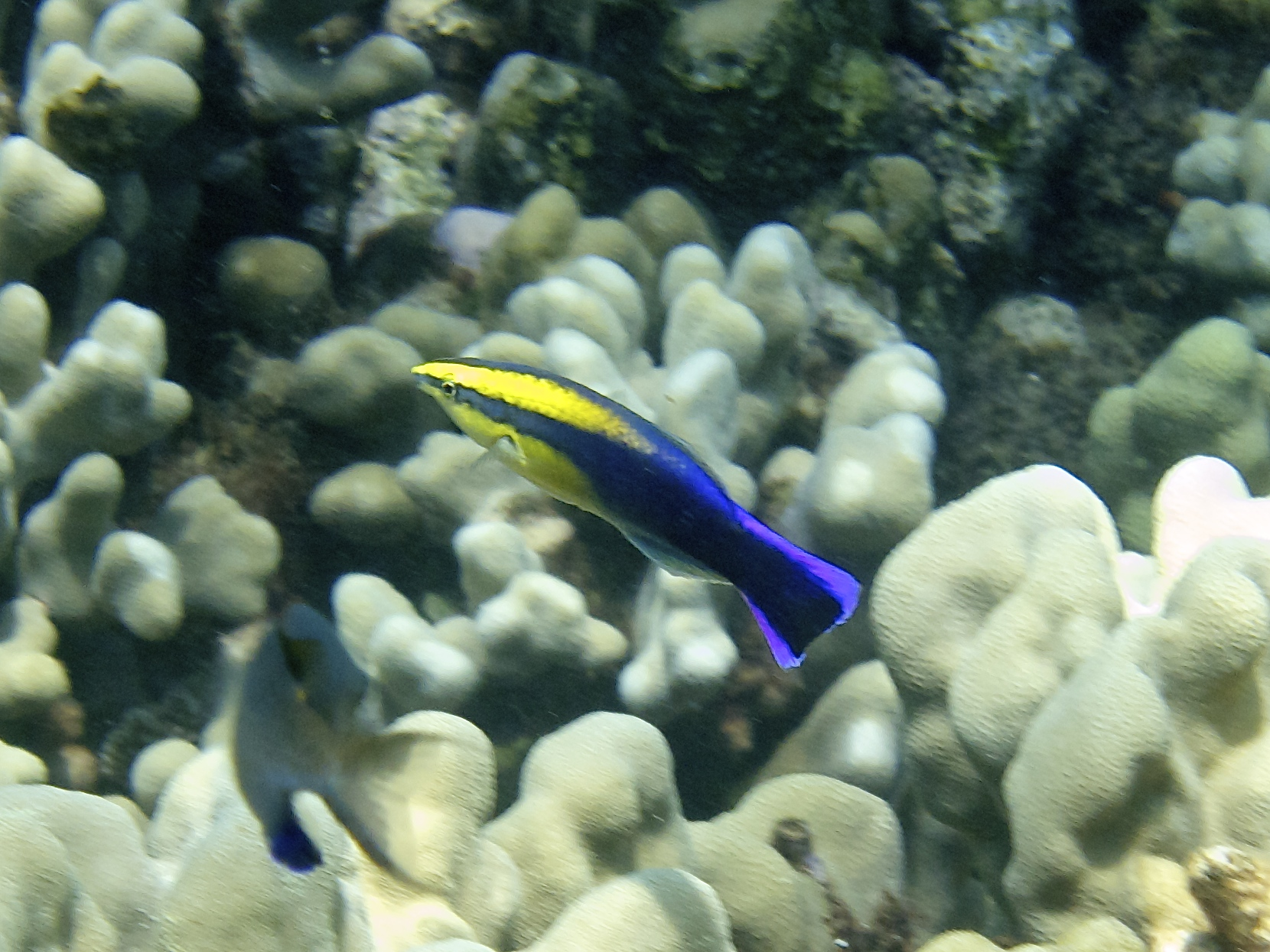
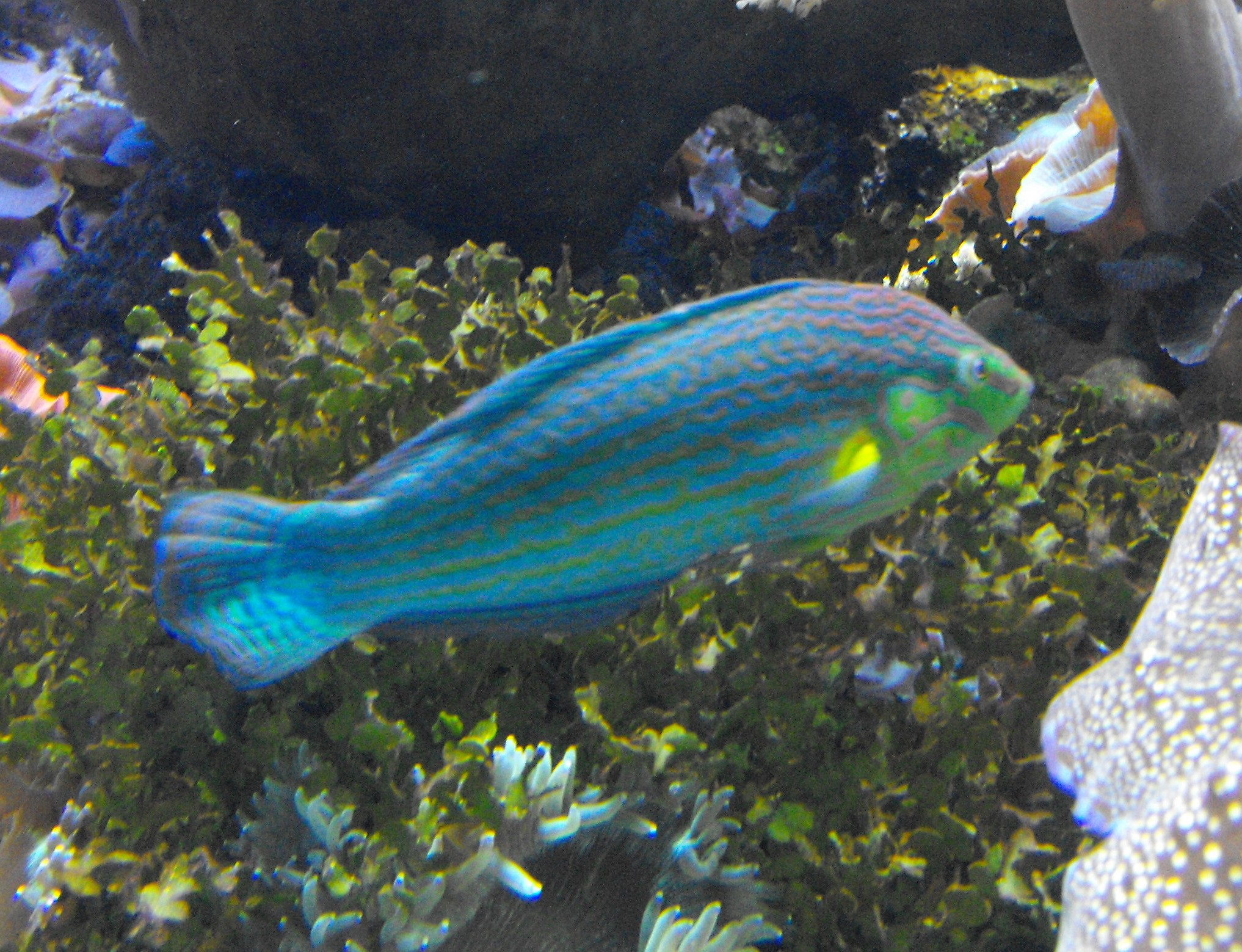
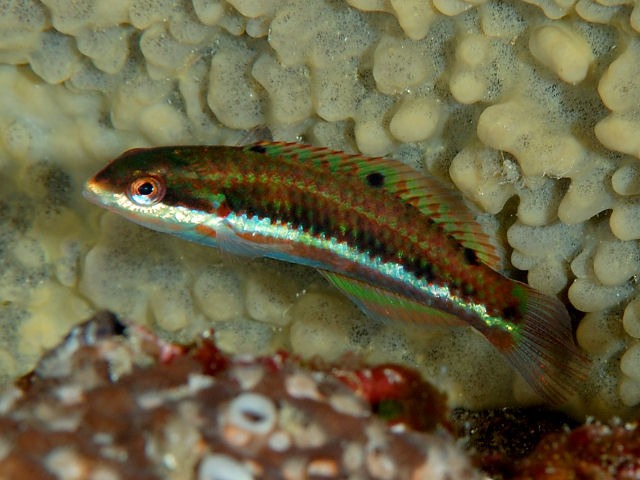
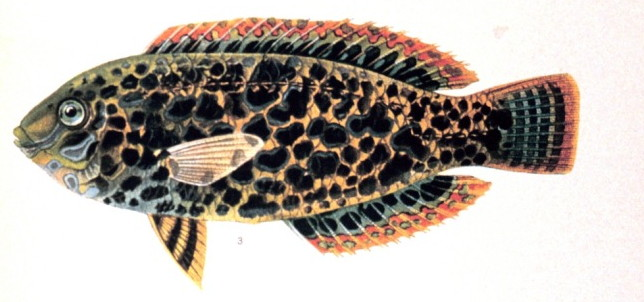
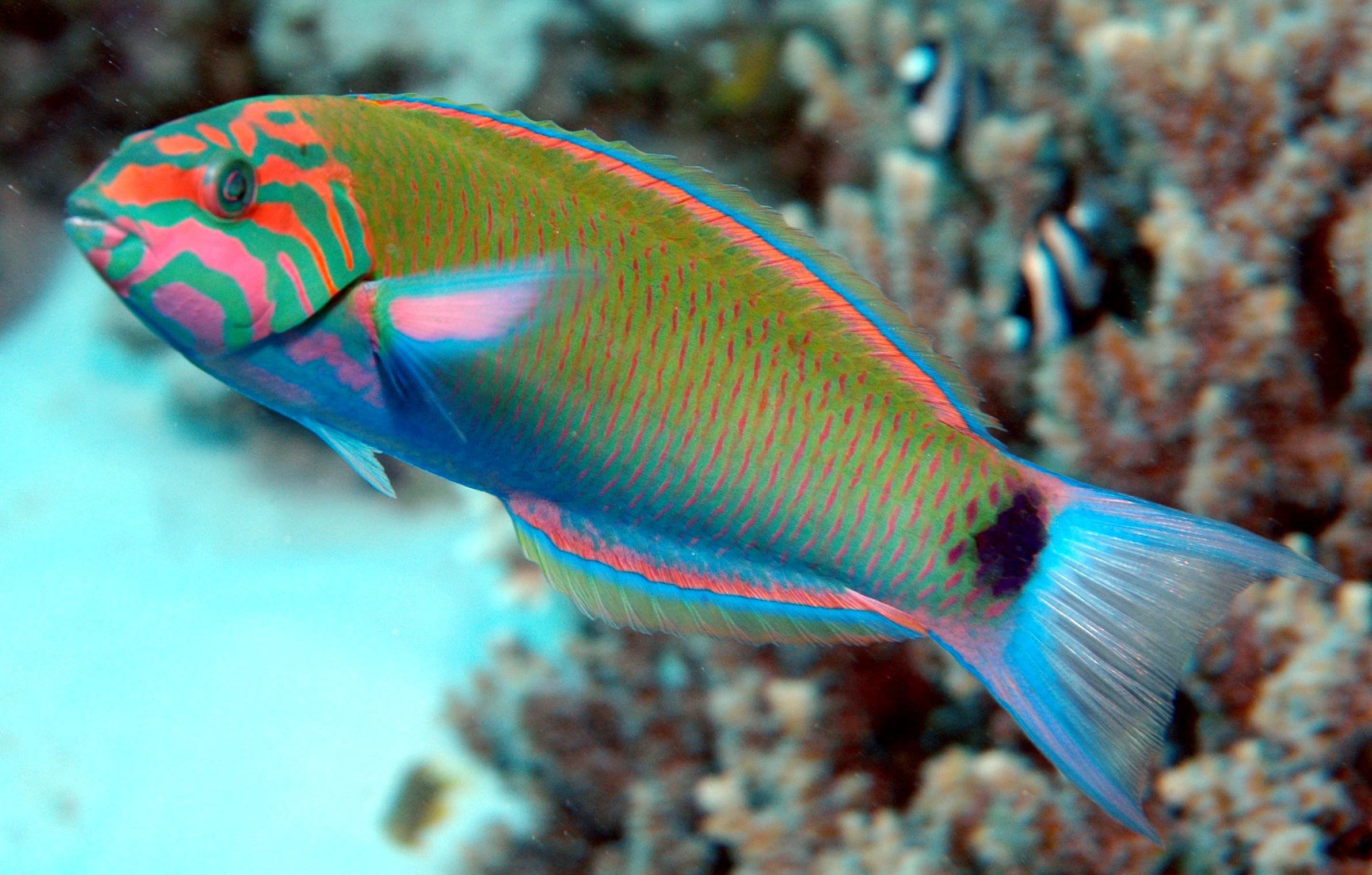
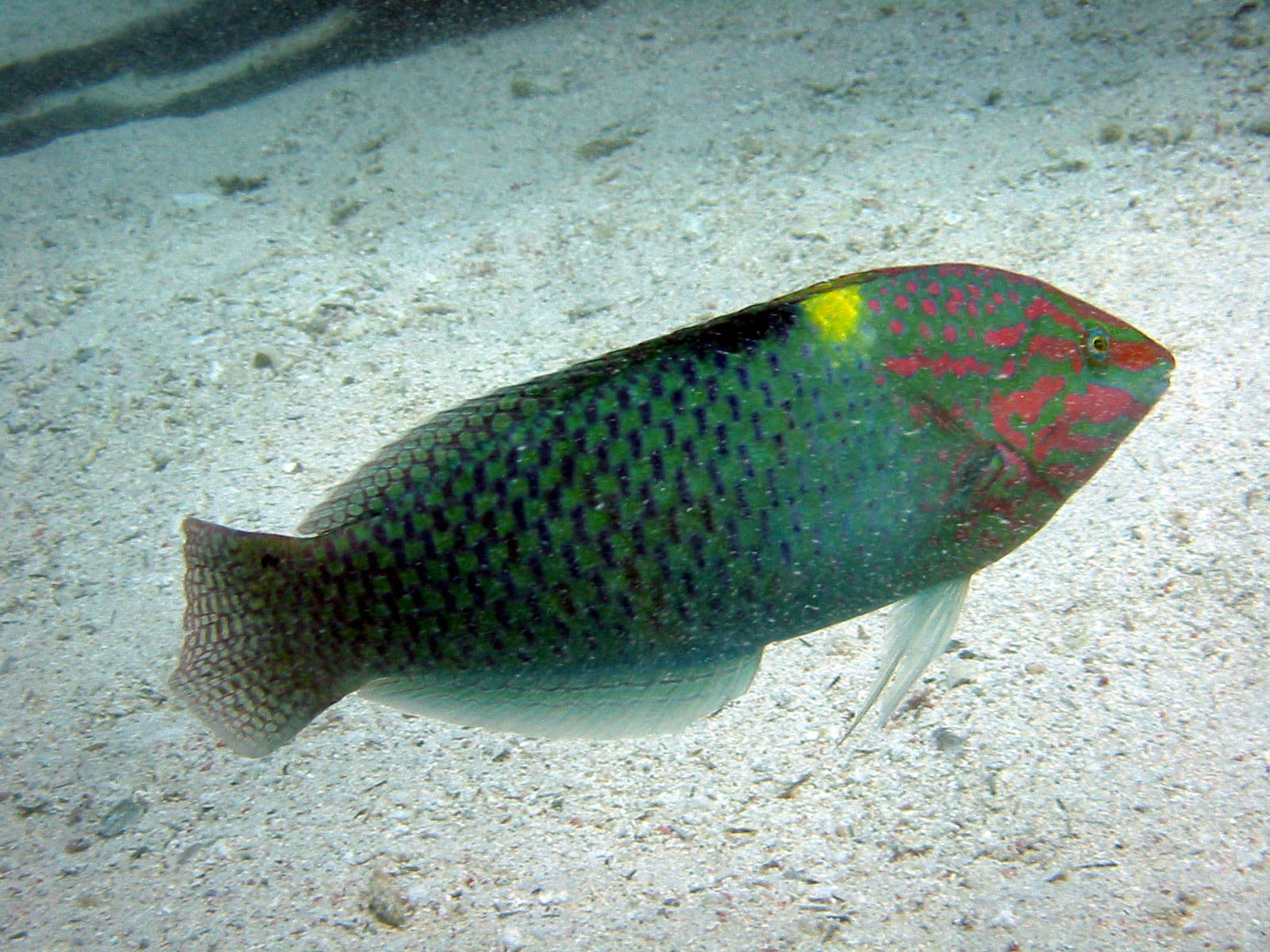
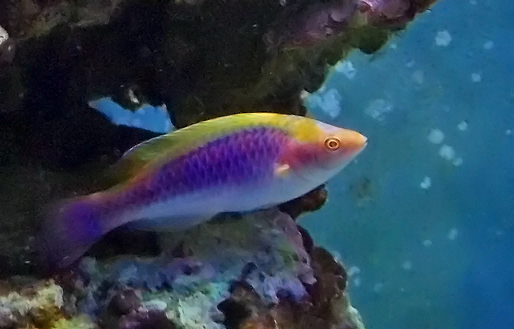
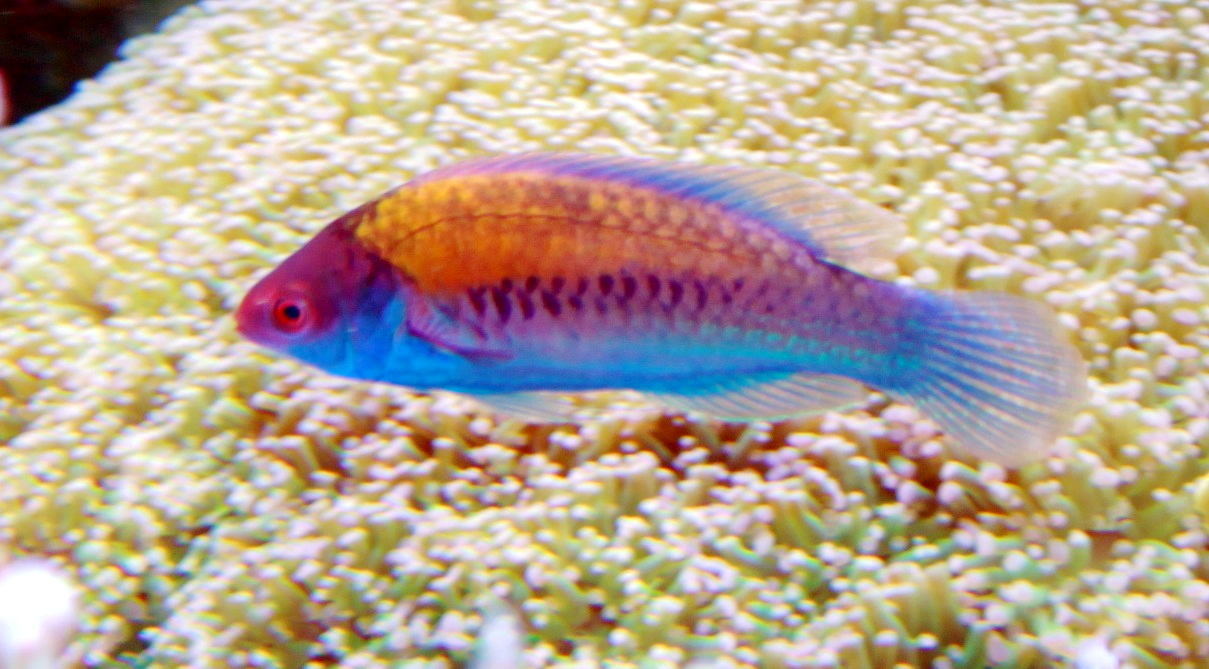
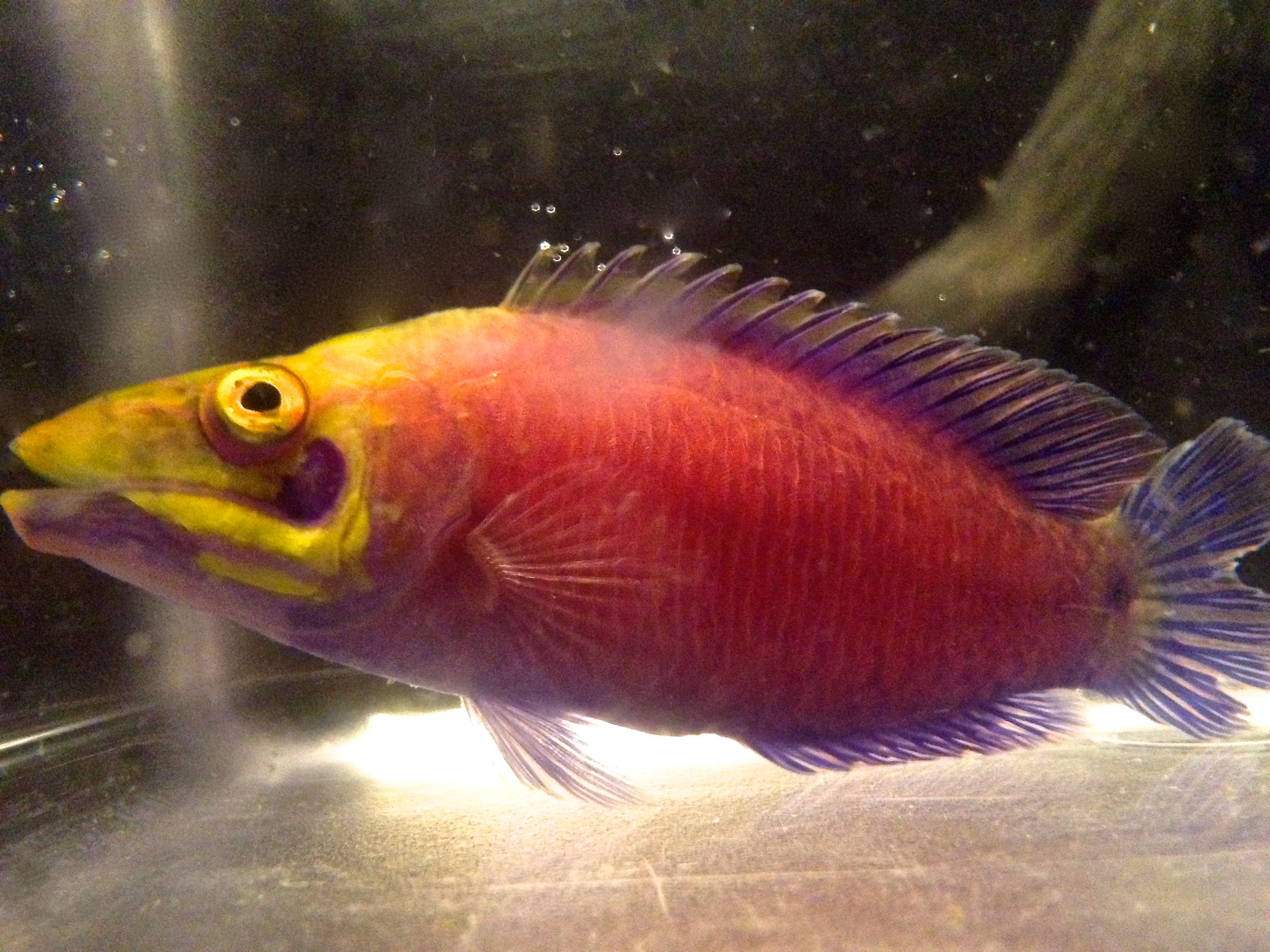
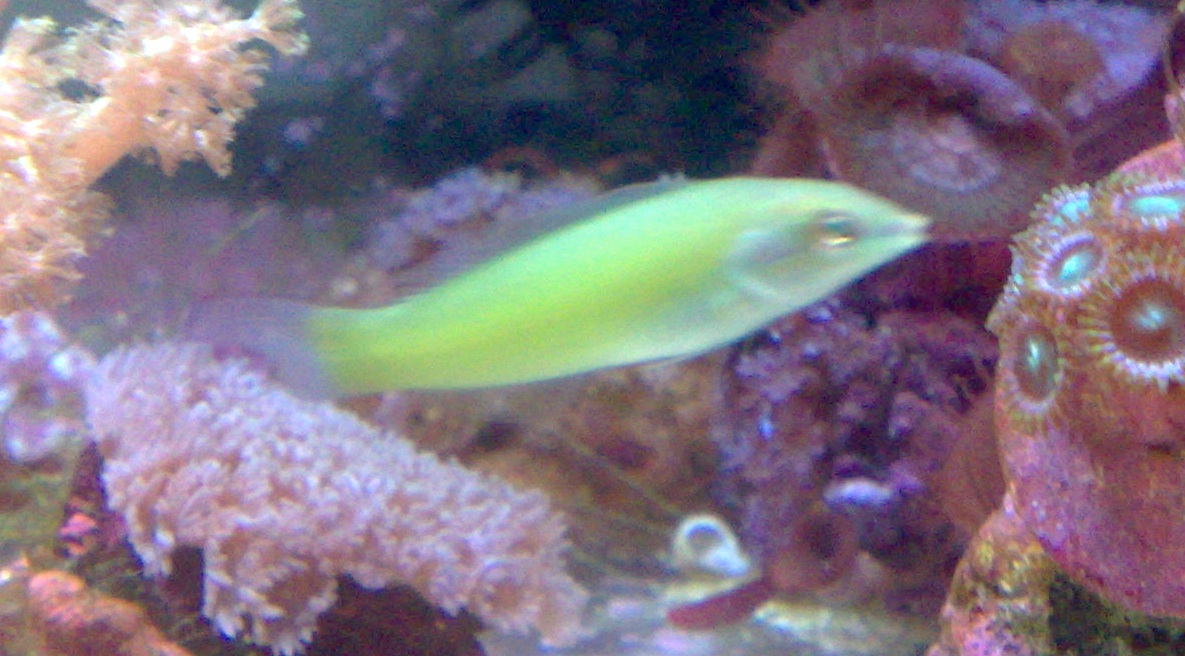
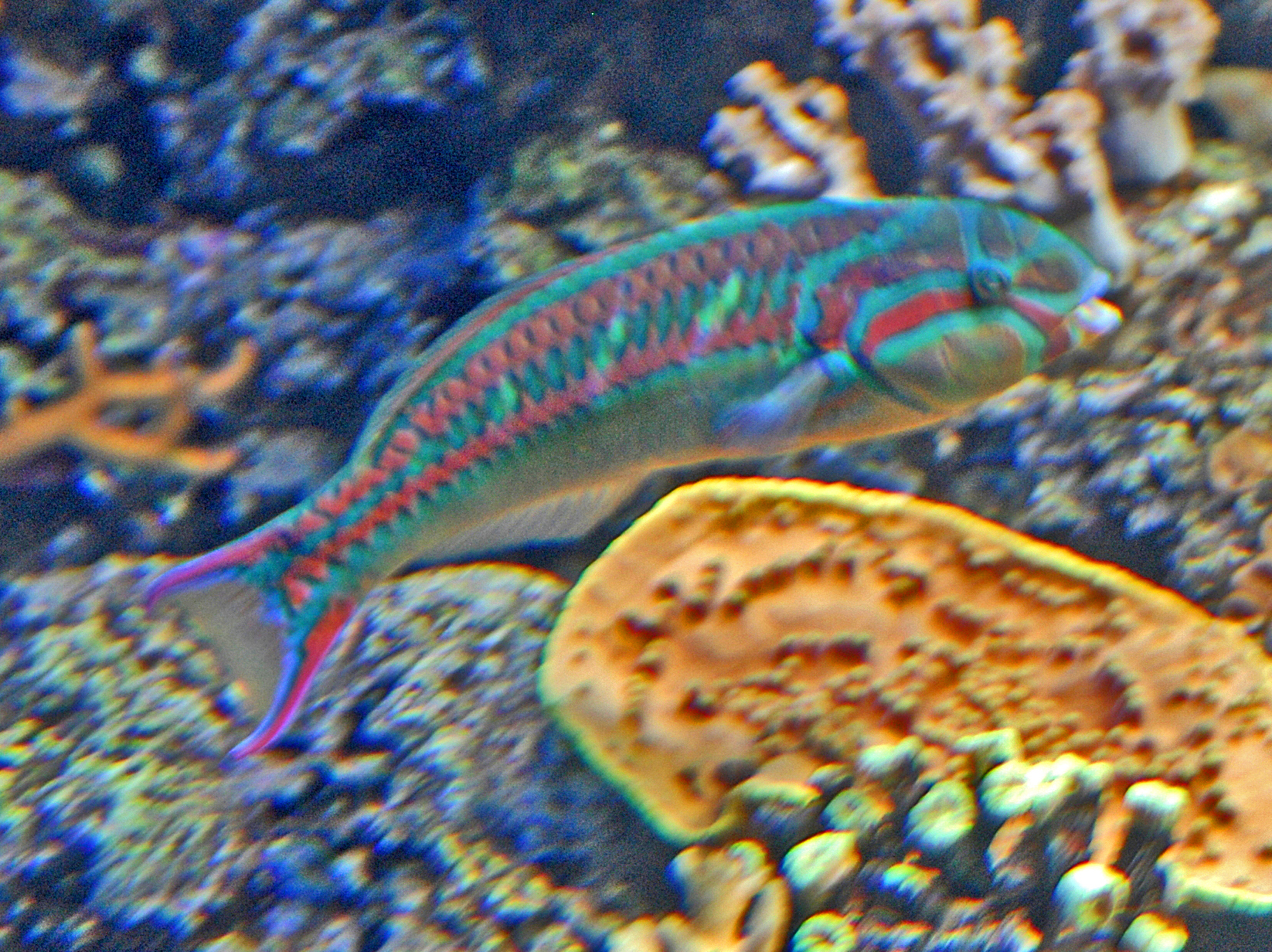
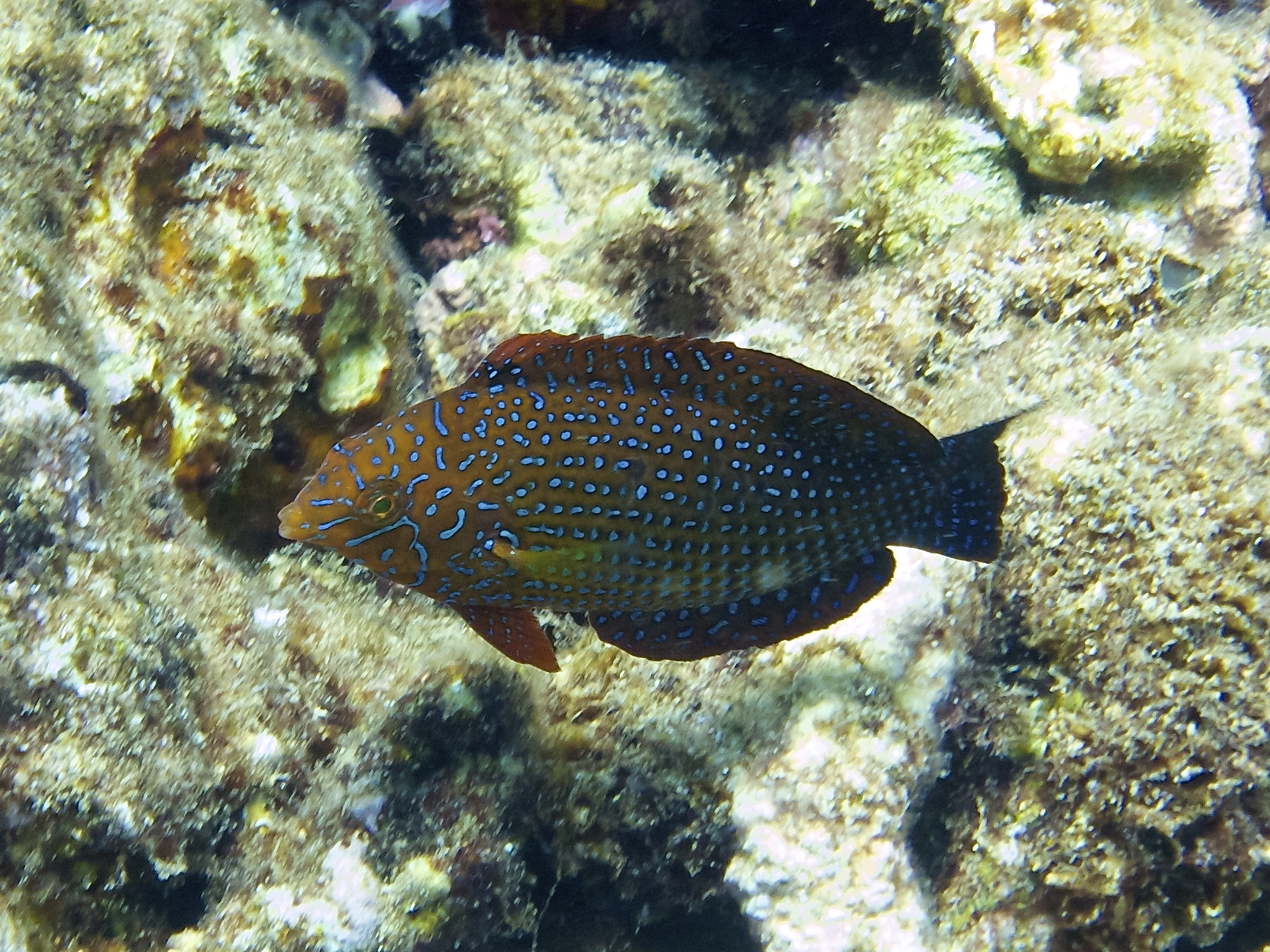
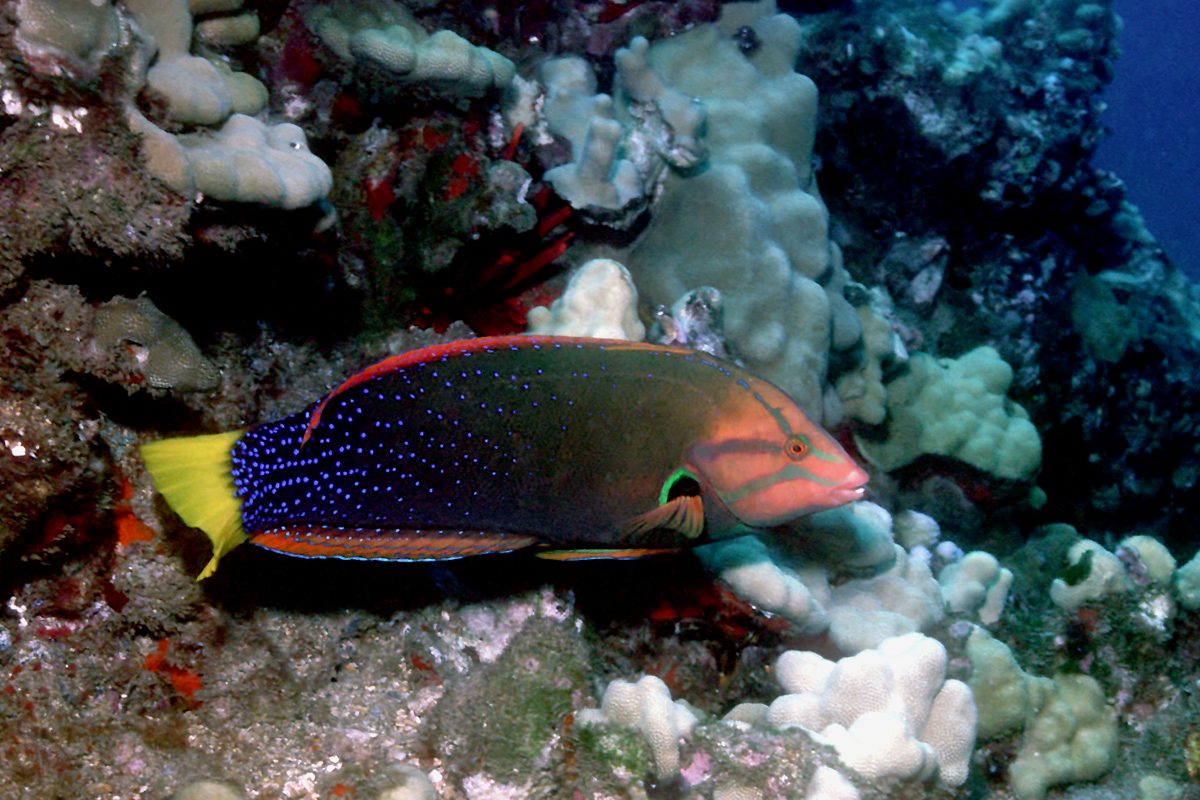
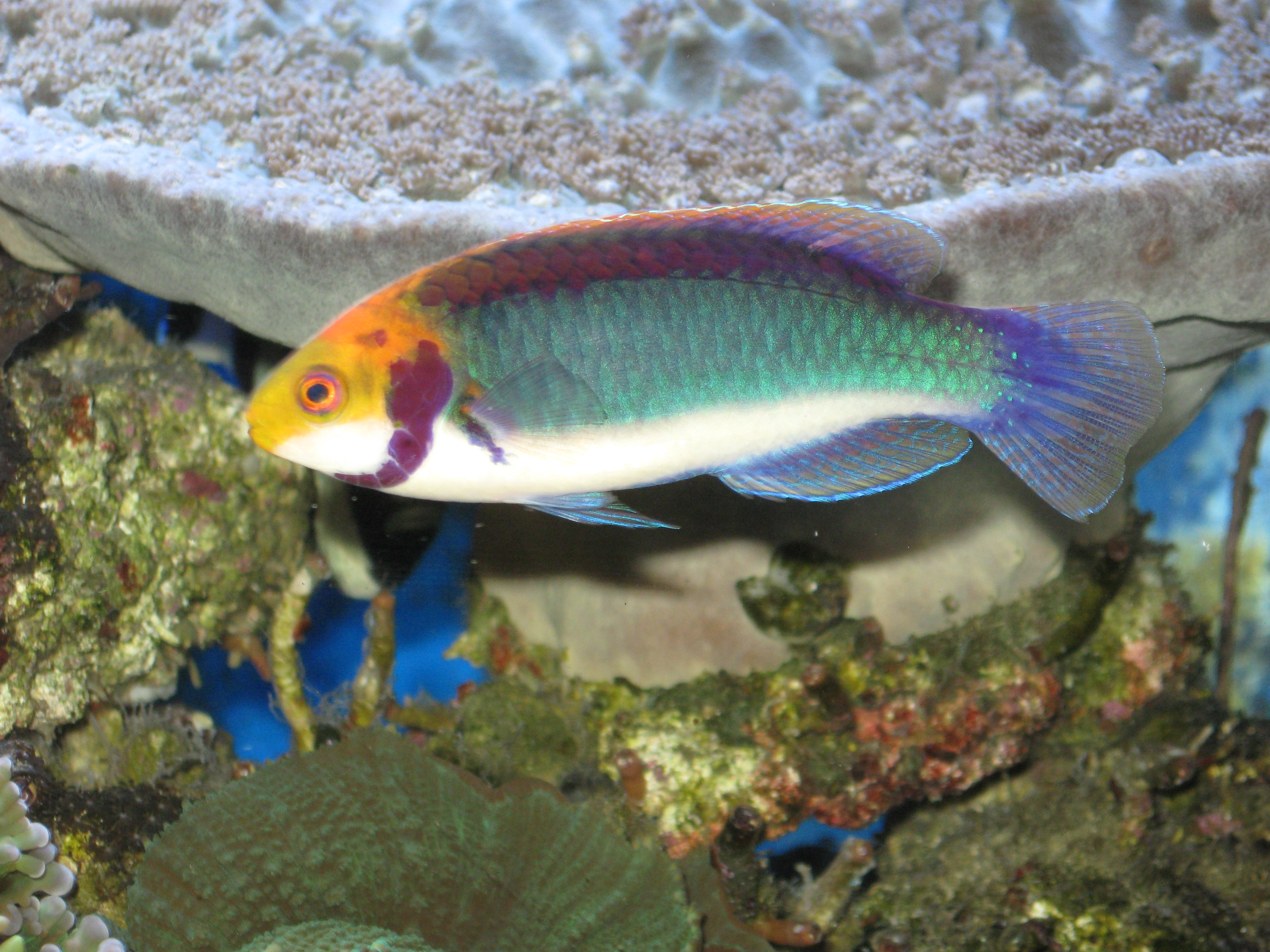
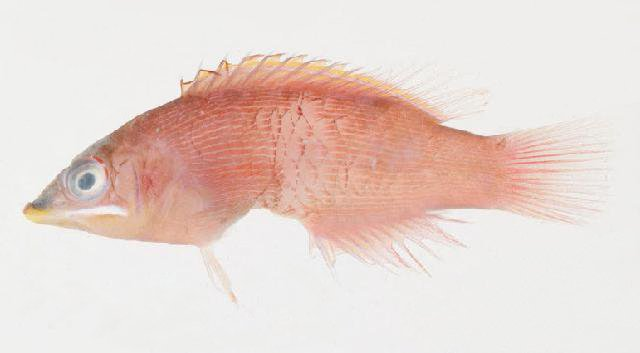
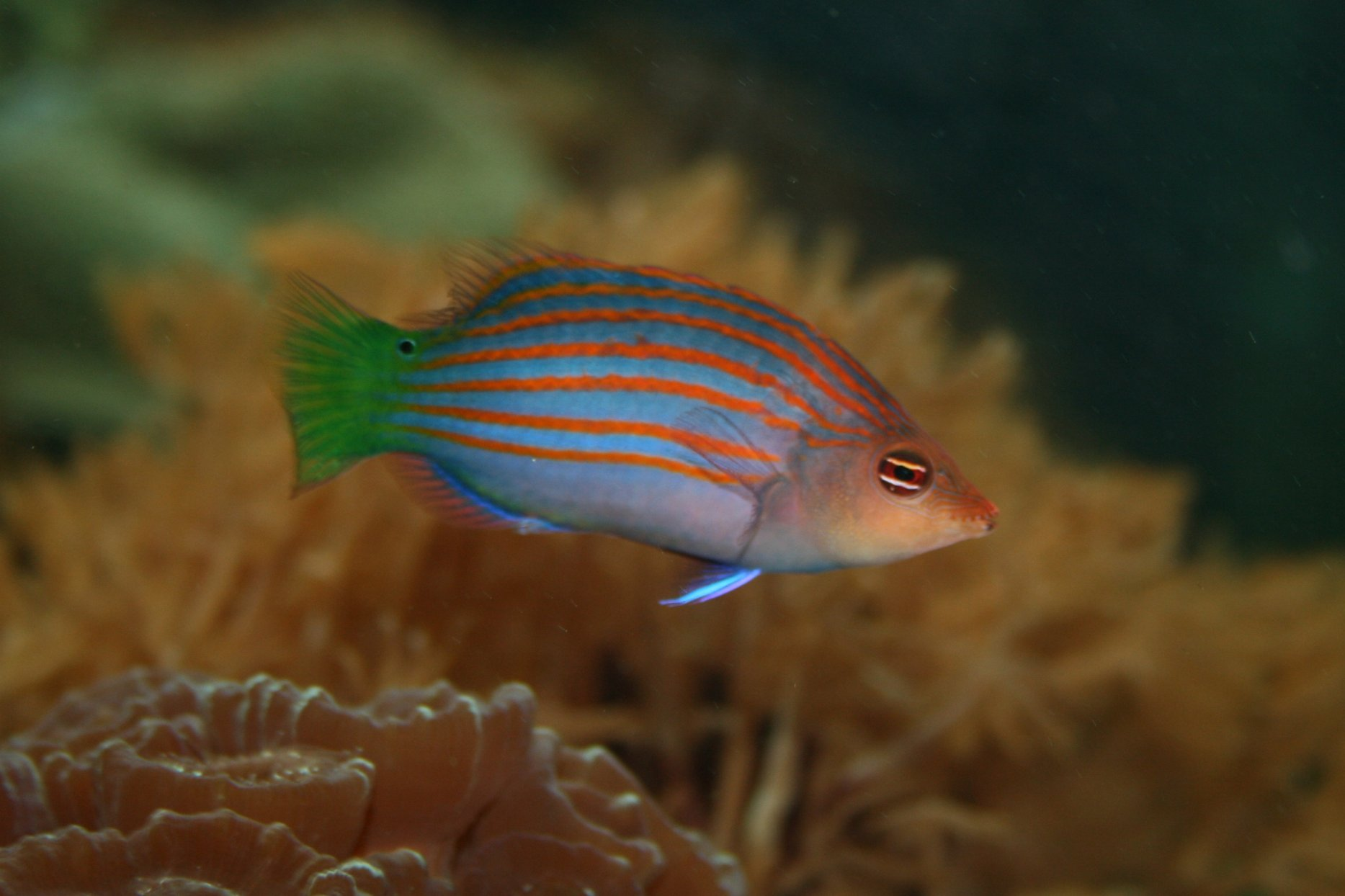
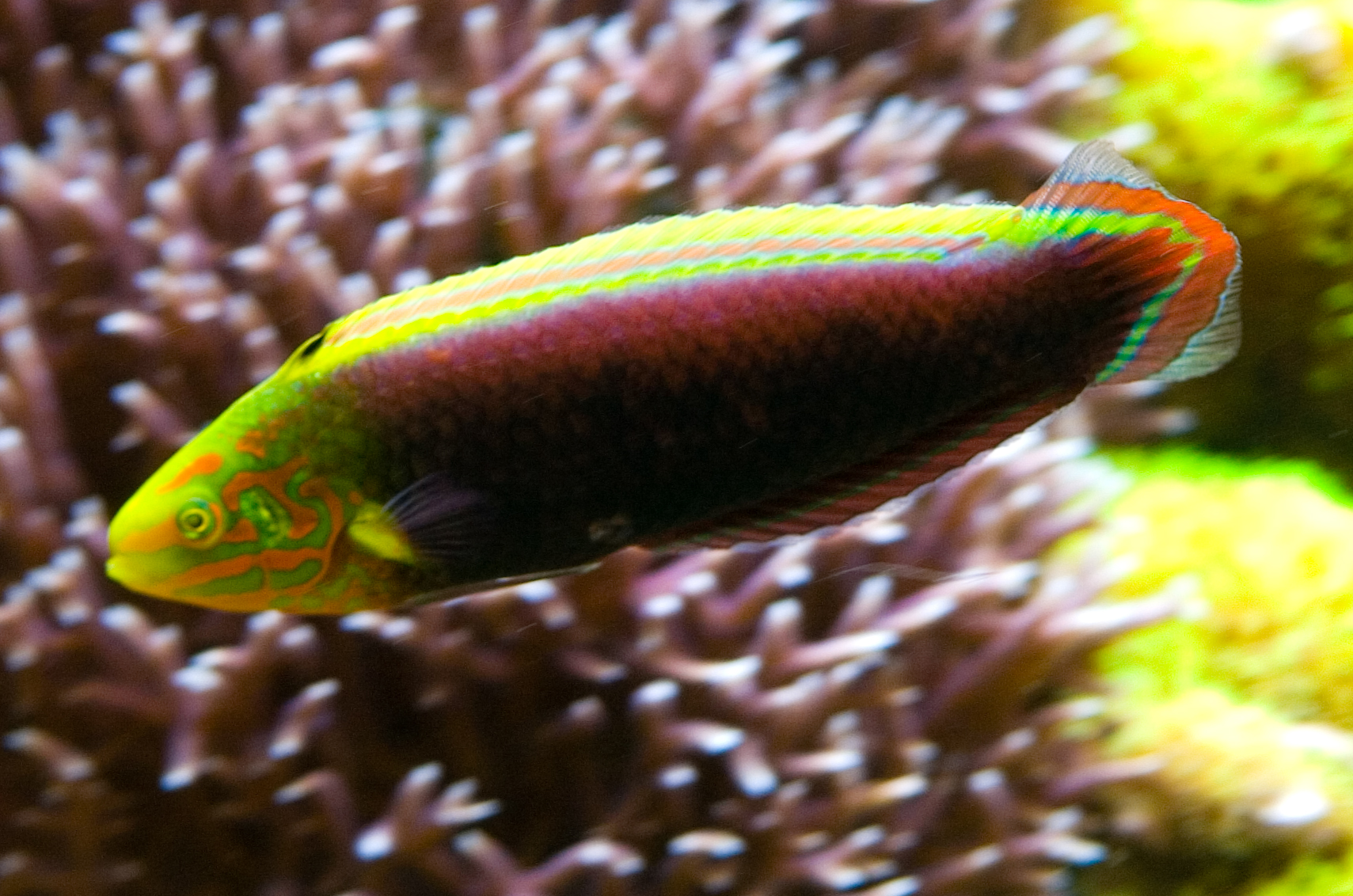
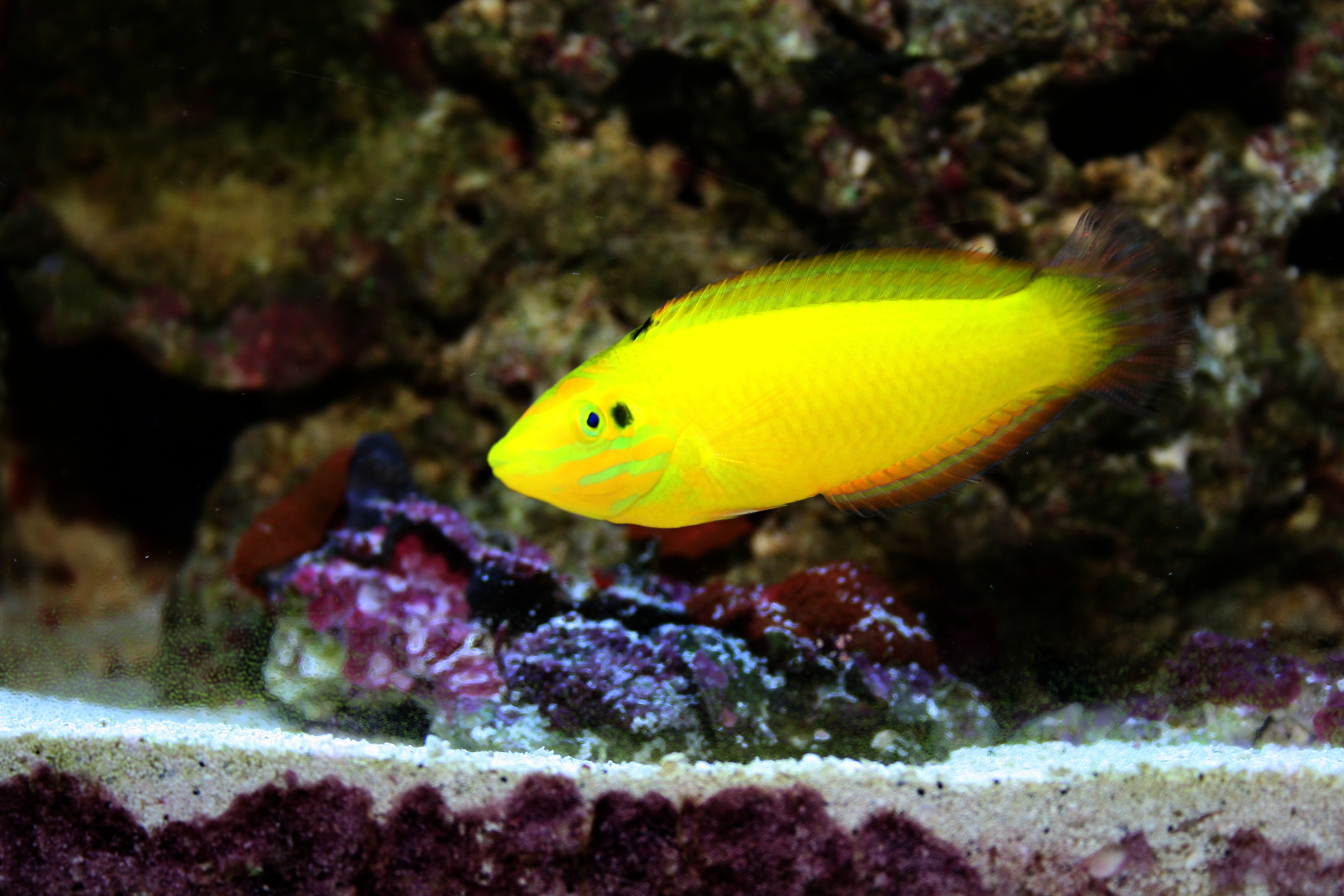
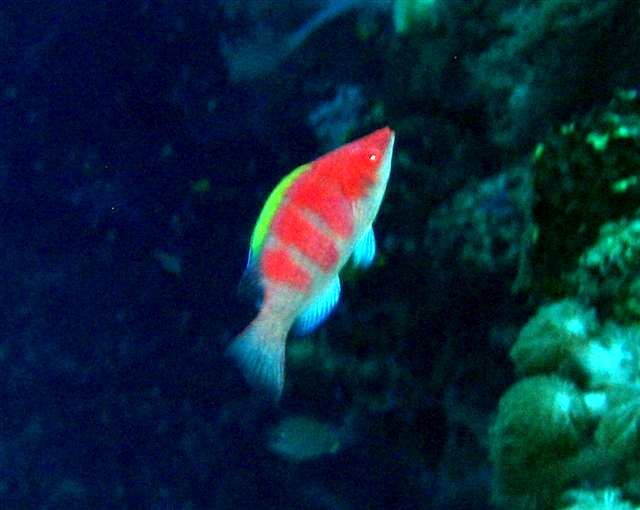
Common name	Image	Taxonomy	Reef safe	Description	Max size
Banana wrasse		Thalassoma lutescens	No		30 cm (11.8 in)
Bicolor cleaner wrasse		Labroides bicolor	Yes
Bird wrasse		Gomphosus varius	No		28 cm (11.0 in)
Bluehead wrasse		Thalassoma bifasciatum	With Caution		28 cm (11.0 in)
Bluestreak cleaner wrasse		Labroides dimidiatus	Yes	as the names suggests it is a cleaner fish and will eat some parasites
Carpenter's flasher wrasse		Paracheilinus carpenteri	Yes; feeds on tiny organisms		8 cm (3.1 in)
Cheeklined maori wrasse		Cheilinus diagrammus	No		36 cm (14.2 in)
Christmas wrasse		Thalassoma trilobatum	No		15 cm (5.9 in)
Cortez rainbow wrasse		Thalassoma lucasanum	No		15 cm (5.9 in)
Dragon wrasse		Novaculichthys taeniourus	No		30 cm (11.8 in)
Eight line wrasse		Pseudocheilinus octotaenia	Yes; feeds on tiny organisms
Exquisite fairy wrasse		Cirrhilabrus exquisitus	Yes; feeds on tiny organisms		10 cm (3.9 in)
Fine-spotted fairy wrasse		Cirrhilabrus punctatus	Yes; feeds on tiny organisms		10 cm (3.9 in)
Flame wrasse		Cirrhilabrus jordani	Yes		10 cm (3.9 in)
Formosa wrasse		Coris formosa	No		61 cm (24.0 in)
Four line wrasse		Pseudocheilinus tetrataenia	Yes; feeds on tiny organisms
Goldbar wrasse		Thalassoma hebraicum	With Caution		23 cm (9.1 in)
Greenback fairy wrasse		Cirrhilabrus scottorum	Yes; feeds on tiny organisms		15 cm (5.9 in)
Harlequin tusk		Choerodon fasciatus	Generally, yes, but may eat shrimp
Hawaiian cleaner wrasse		Labroides phthirophagus	Yes
Hoeven's wrasse		Halichoeres melanurus	With Caution		13 cm (5.1 in)
Jansen saddle wrasse		Thalassoma jansenii	No		20 cm (7.9 in)
Labout's fairy wrasse		Cirrhilabrus laboutei	Yes		8 cm (3.1 in)
Leopard wrasse		Macropharyngodon meleagris	Yes		15 cm (5.9 in)
Lineatus fairy wrasse		Cirrhilabrus lineatus	Yes		13 cm (5.1 in)
Longfin fairy wrasse		Cirrhilabrus rubriventralis	Yes		8 cm (3.1 in)
Lyretail wrasse/Moon wrasse		Thalassoma lunare	No		25 cm (9.8 in)
Marble wrasse		Halichoeres hortulanus	No		28 cm (11.0 in)
McCosker's flasher wrasse		Paracheilinus mccoskeri	Yes		15 cm (5.9 in)
Multicolor lubbock's wrasse		Cirrhilabrus lubbocki	Yes; feeds on tiny organisms		8 cm (3.1 in)
Multicolor velvet wrasse		Cirrhilabrus cyanopleura	Yes; feeds on tiny organisms
Mystery wrasse		Pseudocheilinus ocellatus	Yes
Orange-back fairy wrasse		Cirrhilabrus aurantidorsalis	Yes		13 cm (5.1 in)
Pastel-green wrasse		Halichoeres chloropterus	With Caution		20 cm (7.9 in)
Pinkface wrasse		Thalassoma quinquevittatum	With Caution		15 cm (5.9 in)
Potter's wrasse		Macropharyngodon geoffroyi	Yes; feeds on tiny organisms
Red coris wrasse		Coris gaimard	No		36 cm (14.2 in)
Red-head fairy wrasse		Cirrhilabrus solorensis	Yes; feeds on tiny organisms		13 cm (5.1 in)
Red velvet wrasse		Cirrhilabrus rubrisquamis	Yes		8 cm (3.1 in)
Scarlet pin stripe wrasse		Pseudocheilinus evanidus	Yes		8 cm (3.1 in)
Six line wrasse		Pseudocheilinus hexataenia	Yes	Small pink fish with six purple horizontal lines. Sometimes added to help control flatworms or parasitic snail populations. Semi-aggressive and may pick on shy fish.	8 cm (3.1 in)
Radiant wrasse		Halichoeres iridis	Yes		15 cm (5.9 in)
Rhomboid fairy wrasse		Cirrhilabrus rhomboidalis	Yes	Golden body with purple horizontal stripes on head.	13 cm (5.1 in)
Whip fin fairy wrasse		Cirrhilabrus filamentosus	Yes		9 cm (3.5 in)
Yellow wrasse		Halichoeres chrysus	Yes	Yellow body with three or occasionally four black dots on dorsal fins. Require sand bed for sleeping.	13 cm (5.1 in)
Yellow & purple wrasse		Halichoeres trispilus	Yes		13 cm (5.1 in)
Yellowband wrasse		Cirrhilabrus luteovittatus	Yes		13 cm (5.1 in)
Yellow fin fairy wrasse		Cirrhilabrus flavidorsalis	Yes		8 cm (3.1 in)
Yellow-flanked fairy wrasse		Cirrhilabrus lyukyuensis	Yes		10 cm (3.9 in)

== See also ==
- List of fish common names
- List of marine aquarium invertebrate species
- List of marine aquarium plant species
- List of aquarium fish by scientific name
- List of freshwater aquarium fish species
- List of brackish aquarium fish species
