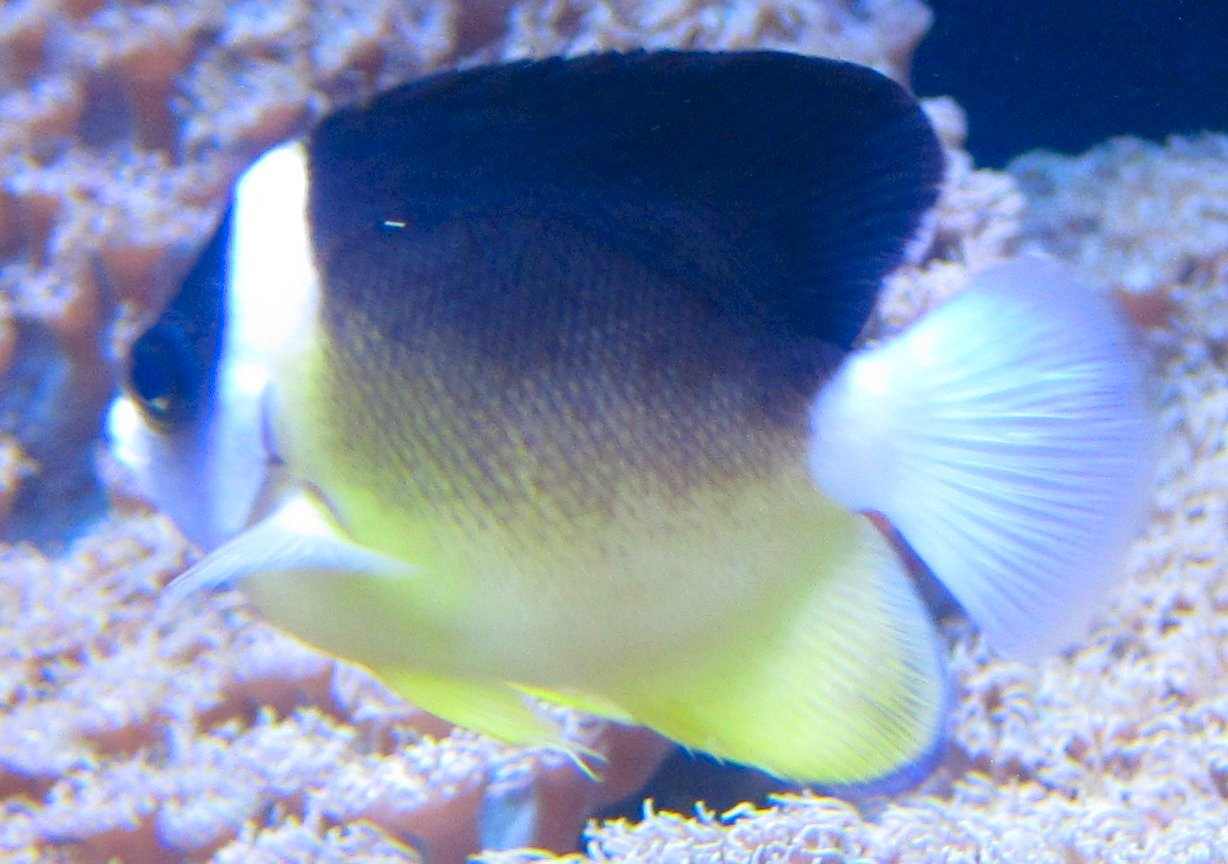

Conservation status
- Least Concern (IUCN 3.1)

Scientific classification
- Kingdom: Animalia
- Phylum: Chordata
- Class: Actinopterygii
- Order: Acanthuriformes
- Family: Pomacanthidae
- Genus: Centropyge
- Species: C. abei

Binomial name
- Centropyge abei Allen, Young & Colin, 2006

= Centropyge abei =

Species of fish

Centropyge abei (Abe's angelfish) is a species of marine ray-finned fish, a small marine angelfish belonging to the family Pomacanthidae. It is found in the western Pacific Ocean.

== Description ==
Centropyge abei has a high, flattened dorsal fin, longer and less arched than this of the other pygmy angelfish of the genus Centropyge, other than C. colini. Another characteristic shared between this species and C. colini is the small face with the large eyes set quite far forward. Both C. abei and C. colini are found in relatively deep water. The overall colour of the body is yellow with the upper third of back, the dorsal fin, and the upper part of head being black. There is a wide white bar immediately in front of the origin of the dorsal fin and this reaches at least as far as the upper edge of the gill cover. The caudal fin and the caudal peduncle are white. Juveniles are less distinctly marked and may have a white tail stripe. The dorsal fin contains 13 spines and 17 soft rays while the anal fin has 3 spines and 18 soft rays. This species attains a maximum total length of 9.1 centimetres (3.6 in).

== Distribution ==
Centropyge abei is found in the Western Pacific Ocean off northern Sulawesi, Palau, southern Japan and on Holmes Reef in the Coral Sea off Queensland.

== Habitat and biology ==
Centropyge abei occurs at depths of 5 to 155 metres (16 to 509 ft) over substrates consisting primarily of variably sized rubble, at temperatures of 20–21 °C (68–70 °F). It is also found on outer reef slopes, drop offs and in caves.

== Systematics ==
Centropyge abei was first formally described in 2006 by Gerald Allen, Forrest Young and Patrick L. Colin with the type locality given as the southeast side of Manado Tua, on Sulawesi. The specific name honours the director of the Japanese public aquarium Aquamarine Fukushima, Yoshitaka Abe, which funded the expedition on which the type was collected. Within the genus Centropyge it appears to be closest to C. colini, both species sharing adaptations for life on deeper reefs than their congeners. other authorities react this species as incertae sedis within the genus.
