= Dwarf angelfish =

Dwarf angelfish can refer to:

- Centropyge, a genus of marine angelfishes.
- Paracentropyge, a genus of marine angelfishes.
- Pterophyllum leopoldi, a species of freshwater angelfish.
