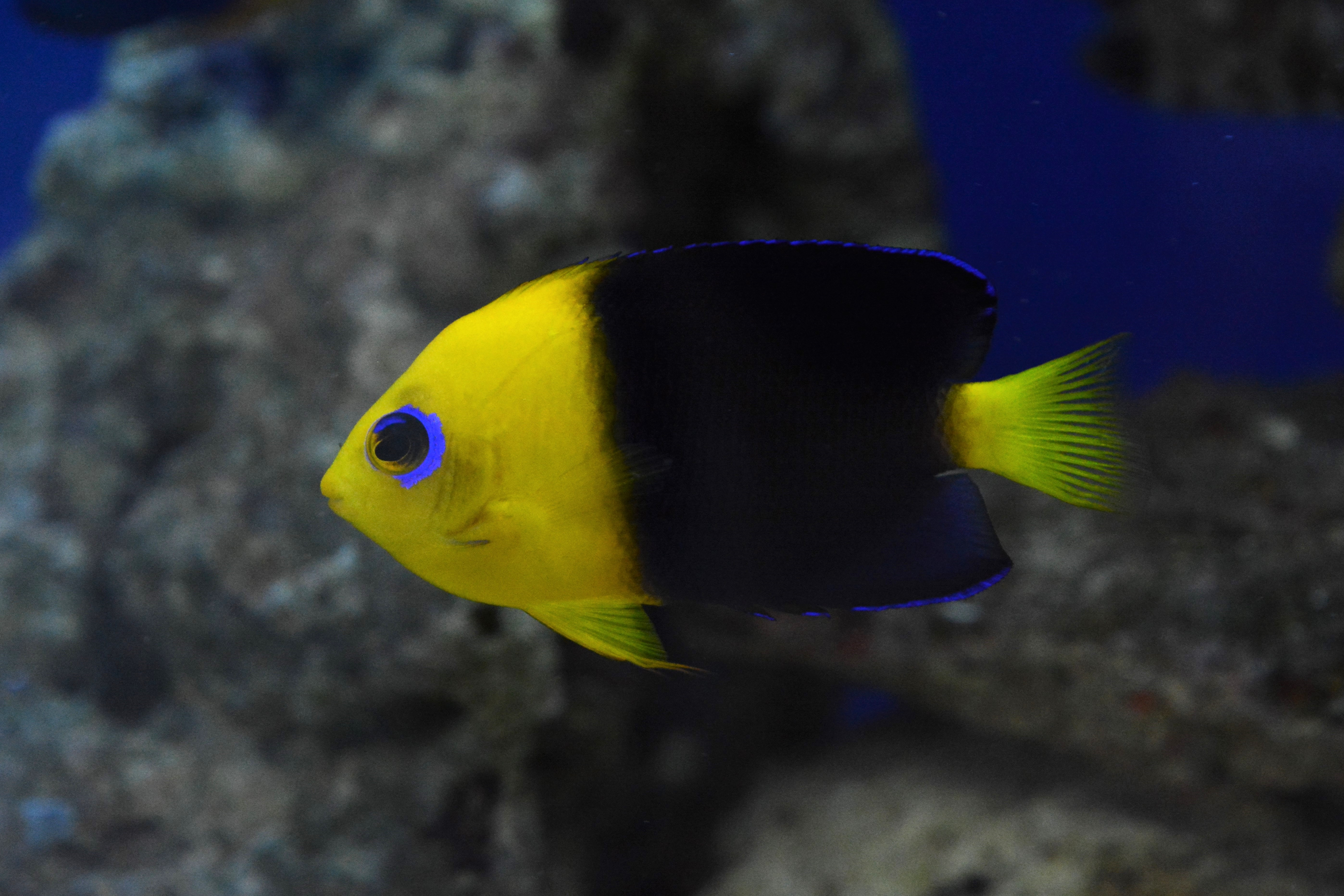
- Image of Centropyge joculator

Conservation status
- Least Concern (IUCN 3.1)

Scientific classification
- Kingdom: Animalia
- Phylum: Chordata
- Class: Actinopterygii
- Division: Teleostei
- Order: Acanthuriformes
- Family: Pomacanthidae
- Genus: Centropyge
- Species: C. joculator

Binomial name
- Centropyge joculator (William F. Smith-Vaniz & John E. Randall, 1974)

= Centropyge joculator =

Species of fish

Centropyge joculator, commonly known as the joculator angelfish, yellow head angelfish, is a species of marine ray-finned fish, a marine angelfish belonging to the family Pomacanthidae. It is found in the central Pacific Ocean.

== Description ==
Centropyge joculator is a brightly colored angelfish that resembles the bicolor angelfish (Centropyge bicolor) but lacks the distinguishing vertical blue bar above the eye. In contrast, the joculator angelfish sports a blue ring around its eyes and the same electric blue coloration traces a thin outline along the edges of its dorsal and anal fins. This fish attains a maximum length of 9 centimetres (3.5 in).

== Distribution ==
Centropyge joculator is found only in the Christmas Islands and Cocos-Keeling Islands in the Eastern Indian Ocean.

== Habitat and biology ==
Centropyge joculator is found at depths between 10 and 70 metres (33 and 230 ft). This species lives in areas of rock, coral or rubble on seaward reefs. Juveniles are occasionally recorded in waters as shallow as 5 metres (16 ft). It is a benthopelagic species which feeds on algae and detritus. They may live in small social groups, harems with a single male and up to 4 females. They are protogynous hermaphrodites and if no male is present the dominant female will change sex.
