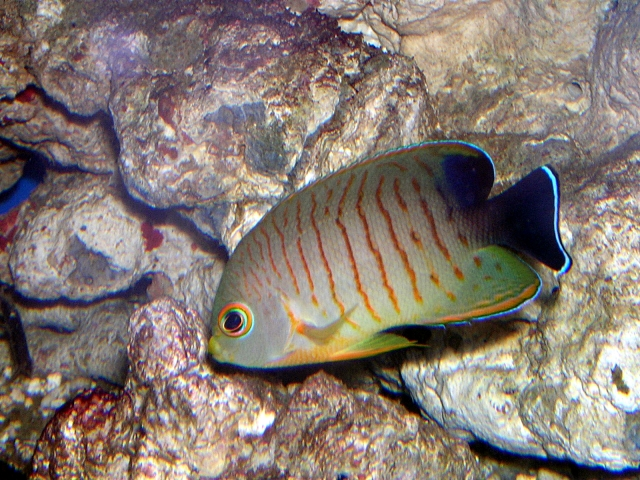

Conservation status
- Least Concern (IUCN 3.1)

Scientific classification
- Kingdom: Animalia
- Phylum: Chordata
- Class: Actinopterygii
- Order: Acanthuriformes
- Family: Pomacanthidae
- Genus: Centropyge
- Species: C. eibli

Binomial name
- Centropyge eibli Klausewitz, 1963

= Centropyge eibli =

Species of fish

Centropyge eibli, the blacktail angelfish, red stripe angelfish, orangelined angelfish, or Eibl dwarf angel is a species of marine ray-finned fish, a marine angelfish belonging to the family Pomacanthidae. It is found near reefs in the Indo-Pacific.

== Description ==
Centropyge eibli is primarily greyish in colour and has thin, vertical wavy bars in rust along its flanks. Its eye is surrounded by an orange ring. The caudal peduncle and the caudal fin are black, with the rear margin of the caudal fin being bright blue. This pattern is similar to that of the juveniles of the Indian Ocean Mimic Surgeonfish Acanthurus tristis. These surgeonfish mimic the small, agile angelfish to deter predators. The dorsal fin contains 14 spines and 15-17 soft rays while the anal fin has 3 spines and 17-18 soft rays. This species attains a maximum total length of 15 centimetres (5.9 in).

== Distribution ==
Centropyge eibli is found in the eastern Indian Ocean from the Maldives and Sri Lanka to north-western Australia, and in Indonesia east as far as Flores. In Australian waters it has been recorded from Christmas Island, Ningaloo Reef, Rowley Shoals and Scott Reef in Western Australia and Ashmore Reef in the Timor Sea.

== Habitat and biology ==
Centropyge eibli is found at depths between 3 and 25 metres (9.8 and 82.0 ft). It occurs in shallow areas which have dense growth of coral in lagoons, the Seward reefs and sometimes in channels with tidal currents. It is typically encountered in a small harems of a male and several females. It feeds mainly on algae. This species is a protogynous hermaphrodite and the dominant female in a harem will change sex to male if the male disappears.

== Systematics ==
Centropyge eibli Was first formally described in 1963 by the German ichthyologist Wolfgang Klausewitz (1922-2018) with the type locality given as Castle Bay, Tillanchong, Nicobar Islands. The specific name honours the ethologist and ichthyologist Irenäus Eibl-Eibesfeldt (1928-2018) who collected some of the type series. Within the genus Centropyge this species is considered, by some authorities, to be in the subgenus Centropyge. It has been recorded hybridisation with Centropyge vrolikii where they are sympatric, and with the C. flavissima at Christmas Island and Cocos (Keeling) Islands.

== Utilisation ==
Centropyge eibli is sometimes found in the aquarium trade. The specimens which are exported to Europe and North America are mostly exported through Sri Lanka.
