= Blue velvet angelfish =

Scientific classification
- Kingdom: Animalia
- Phylum: Chordata
- Class: Actinopterygii
- Order: Acanthuriformes
- Family: Pomacanthidae
- Genus: Centropyge
- Species: C. deborae

Binomial name
- Centropyge deborae Shen, Ho & Chang, 2012

Species of fish

The blue velvet angelfish (Centropyge deborae), also known as the Fiji blue twilight angelfish, is a small species of marine angelfish, family Pomacanthidae. It is only known from Fiji where it was initially considered to be a variety or subspecies of the midnight pygmy angelfish.

== Description ==
The blue velvet angelfish has an overall bluish-black colour, although in poor light it appears black. The caudal fin has a white rear margin and the rays of the pectoral fin are black separated by a transparent membrane. The dorsal fin has 13–14 spines and 16–17 soft rays while the anal fin has 3 spines and 17–18 soft rays. This species attains a maximum total length of 7 centimetres (2.8 in).

== Distribution ==
The blue velvet angelfish is only known from Fiji.

== Habitat and biology ==
The blue velvet angelfish is an extremely shy fish which often hides among rubble and rocks, particularly when alarmed, on seamounts.

== Systematics ==
The blue velvet angelfish was first formally described in 2012 by Kang-Ning Shen, Hsuan-Ching Ho, and Chih-Wei Chang with the type locality given as Bligh Water, east of Yasawa Island in Fiji. The specific name honours Deborah Smith, wife of Walt Smith, a collector and trader in the aquarium trade who collected the type series. Within the genus Centropyge this species is considered to be incertae sedis. It was initially identified as C. nox but the blue tint and subsequent genetic analysis at the National Taiwan University confirmed it was a new species.

== Utilization ==
The blue velvet angelfish makes an occasional appearance in the aquarium trade.
