= Resplendent pygmy angelfish =

Conservation status
- Least Concern (IUCN 3.1)

Scientific classification
- Kingdom: Animalia
- Phylum: Chordata
- Class: Actinopterygii
- Order: Acanthuriformes
- Family: Pomacanthidae
- Genus: Centropyge
- Species: C. resplendens

Binomial name
- Centropyge resplendens Lubbock & Sankey, 1975

Species of fish

The resplendent pygmy angelfish (Centropyge resplendens) is a species of marine ray-finned fish, a marine angelfish, belonging to the family Pomacanthidae. It is endemic to Ascension Island in the South Atlantic Ocean.

== Description ==
The resplendent pygmy angelfish has a body which is largely deep blue in colour. There is a yellow patch over the snout and yellow along the back and dorsal fin to the yellow caudal fin. The dorsal fin contains 14 spines and 16 rays while the anal fin has 3 spines and 17 rats. This species attains am maximum total length of 6 centimetres (2.4 in).

== Distribution ==
The resplendent pygmy angelfish is found in the South Atlantic Ocean where it is endemic to the waters around Ascension Island.

== Habitat and biology ==
The resplendent pygmy angelfish occur at depths between 15 and 40 metres (49 and 131 ft), over rock and rubble substrates. It feeds on algae or detritus. It is a protogynous hermaphrodite, like other members of the genus Centropyge, and the young fish are of indeterminate sex, become female at sexual maturity and if there is no male the dominant female changes sex to become male. This sex change can be reversed, which takes a few weeks.

== Systematics ==
The resplendent pygmy angelfish was first formally described in 1975 by Hugh Roger Lubbock (1951-1981) and Richard D. Sankey. The specific name resplendens means "resplendent", a reference to the beauty of its colour. Some authorities place this species in the subgenus Xiphypops.

== Utilisation ==
The resplendent pygmy angelfish is rare in the aquarium trade, although it has been successfully bred in captivity, albeit infrequently.

== See also ==
- Cherubfish (Also called the pygmy angelfish)

== Sources ==
- Roberts, C. 1996. Centropyge resplendens. 2006 IUCN Red List of Threatened Species. Downloaded on 4 August 2007.
