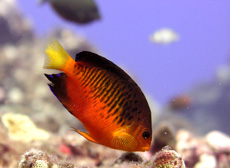

Conservation status
- Least Concern (IUCN 3.1)

Scientific classification
- Kingdom: Animalia
- Phylum: Chordata
- Class: Actinopterygii
- Order: Acanthuriformes
- Family: Pomacanthidae
- Genus: Centropyge
- Species: C. shepardi

Binomial name
- Centropyge shepardi J. E. Randall & Yasuda, 1979

= Centropyge shepardi =

Species of fish

Centropyge shepardi, the mango angelfish, Shepard's angelfish or Shepard's pygmy angelfish, is a species of marine ray-finned fish, a marine angelfish belonging to the family Pomacanthidae. It is found in the Western Pacific Ocean.

== Description ==
Centropyge shepardi has an oval-shaped. body with the dorsal and anal fins being rounded to slightly pointed at their ends. It varies in its orange background colour from nearly red to light apricot, the dorsal part being slightly darker than the ventral part. There is normally dark vertical barring on the body but this may be restricted to a small patch to the rear of the gill cover, and in rarely it may be absent. Males have a vivid blue margin to the soft rayed part of the dorsal and anal fins. The dorsal fin contains 14 spines and 16-18 soft rays while the anal fin has 3 spines and 17-18 soft rays. This species attains a maximum total length of 9 centimetres (3.5 in).

== Distribution ==
Centropyge shepardi is found in the western Pacific Ocean, where its distribution is restricted to the Northern Marianas Islands, Guam, the Ogasawara Islands of southern Japan. Recently they are found at Yoron island and Okinoerabu island of southern Japan. It has been recorded from the Izu Islands of Japan, but this probably refers to vagrants. It has been reported from Palau and the Philippines but these reports need confirmation.

== Habitat and biology ==
Centropyge shepardi is a common species within its range where it is found at depths of 10 to 56 metres (33 to 184 ft). It is typically encountered in small groups on exposed outer reef slopes, occasionally on lagoon reefs. It is associated with areas of mixed live and dead coral where there is plenty of holes and caves for shelter. It is mainly herbivorous, most of its diet being algae. The groups are harems of 3-7 individuals. This oviparous species is a broadcast spawner, spawning is thought to start in September and takes place at dusk. The male displays to a female, pushing and chasing her until she releases her eggs at which point the sperm is released. The eggs hatch after 2 to 3 days.

== Systematics ==
Centropyge shepardi was first formally described in 1979 by John Ernest Randall (1924-2020) and Fujio Yasuda with the type locality given as the western side of Cocos Island in Guam. The specific name honours John W. Shepard of the University of Guam, who demonstrated the sympatry of this species with C. bispinosa in Guam and who drew Randall and Yasuda's attention to the two species' differing number of pectoral fin rays. Some authorities place this species in the subgenus Centropyge.

== Utilisation ==
Centropyge shepardi is rare in the aquarium trade and when it does come to market it is rather expensive.
