= Centropyge cocosensis =

Scientific classification
- Kingdom: Animalia
- Phylum: Chordata
- Class: Actinopterygii
- Order: Acanthuriformes
- Family: Pomacanthidae
- Genus: Centropyge
- Species: C. cocosensis

Binomial name
- Centropyge cocosensis Shen, Chang, Delrieu-Trottin & Borsa, 2016

Species of fish

Centropyge cocosensis, commonly known as the Cocos pygmy angelfish, is a species of marine angelfish belonging to the family Pomacanthidae.

== Description ==
Centropyge cocosensis is a brightly colored angelfish that resembles the lemonpeel angelfish (Centropyge flavissima). As a recently discovered angelfish, this species is the colour of a lemonpeel angel, with a blue margined gill operculum, spine and fins; a conspicuous blue iris and faint blue eye ring surrounding the eye. In alcohol, its colour is uniformly yellowish with dark eye and dark posterior dorsal, anal and caudal fin margins; which differs from C. flavissima (and 2 other species of this species complex) by nucleotide quasisynapomorphies at the CO1 locus, these include G at both nucleotide sites 247 and 366 of the gene. Little is known about this fish, including maximum length, breeding habits, and food preferences.

== Distribution ==
Centropyge cocosensis is known only from Christmas Island and the Cocos (Keeling) Islands in the Eastern Indian Ocean.

== Utilisation ==
Centropyge cocosensis specimens are rarely obtained through aquarium trade.
