= Centropyge narcosis =

Conservation status
- Least Concern (IUCN 3.1)

Scientific classification
- Kingdom: Animalia
- Phylum: Chordata
- Class: Actinopterygii
- Order: Acanthuriformes
- Family: Pomacanthidae
- Genus: Centropyge
- Species: C. narcosis

Binomial name
- Centropyge narcosis Pyle & Randall, 1993

Species of fish

Centropyge narcosis, the narc angelfish, is a species of marine ray-finned fish, a marine angelfish belonging to the family Pomacanthidae. It is native to the Cook Islands. It is found at a depth range of 100m - 128m. This species is more expensive than the well known peppermint angelfish in the aquarium trade.

== Description ==
Centropyge narcosis is vivid yellow over the whole of its body and fins broken only by a large black blotch in the middle of the upper flank. This is a small species which attains a maximum total length of 5.5 centimetres (2.2 in).

== Distribution ==
Centropyge narcosis is endemic to the Cook Islands where it has been only recorded from the waters around Rarotonga.

== Habitat and biology ==
Centropyge narcosis is found at depths between 100 and 120 metres (330 and 390 ft). It is normally found in pairs or small groups in caves and in cracks on steep drop offs. It is a little known species and its natural diet is a mystery but in captivity it will eat a variety of foods. This species usually swims "upside down", swimming with its head down and its underside very close to the substrate. When it perceives a threat, it will adopt a head down position, erect the spines in its dorsal fin and use the spots on its flanks to impersonate a large predatory fish.

== Systematics ==
Centropyge narcosis was first formally described in 1993 by Richard Pyle and John Ernest Randall (1924-2020). The specific name, narcosis, refers to the extreme effects of nitrogen narcosis that the Richard Pyle and Charles "Chip" Boyle suffered when they collected the holotype at a depth greater than 100 metres (330 ft) while using conventional SCUBA equipment. Some authorities place this species in the subgenus Centropyge.

== Utlisation ==
Centropyge narcosis is very rare in the aquarium trade and commands high prices when it does come up for sale.
