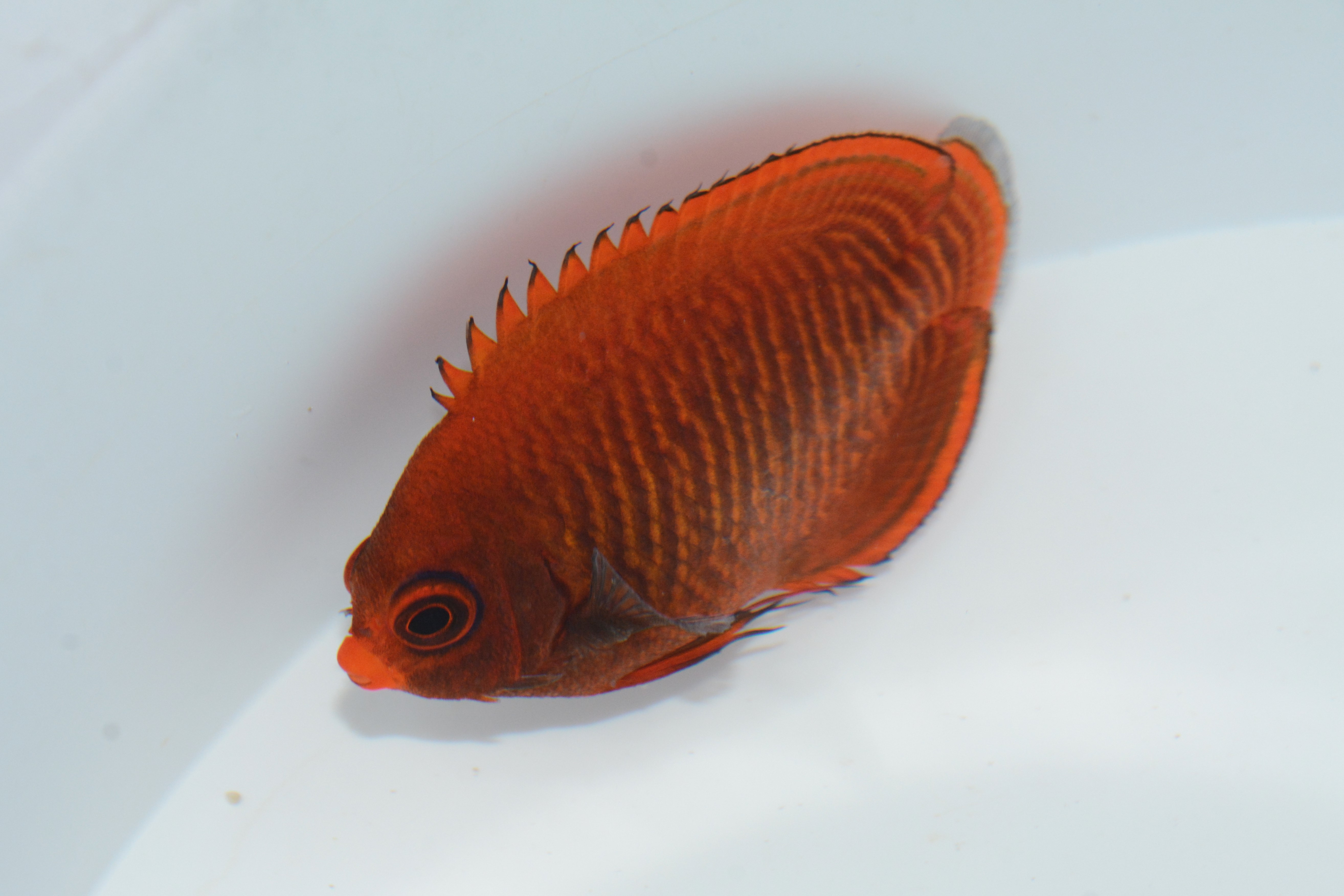
- Centropyge aurantia in captivity

Conservation status
- Least Concern (IUCN 3.1)

Scientific classification
- Kingdom: Animalia
- Phylum: Chordata
- Class: Actinopterygii
- Order: Acanthuriformes
- Family: Pomacanthidae
- Genus: Centropyge
- Species: C. aurantia

Binomial name
- Centropyge aurantia Randall & Wass, 1974

= Golden angelfish =

Species of fish

Golden angelfish (Centropyge aurantia), also known as golden pygmy angelfish or velvet dwarf angel, is a small marine ray-finned fish, a marine angelfish belonging to the family Pomacanthidae. It inhabits shallow reefs in the western Pacific Ocean.

== Description ==
The Golden angelfish is an overall reddish orange in colour marked with numerous vertical thin sinuous golden bars on its flanks. The dorsal, anal and caudal fins have a few dark submarginal bands. The eye is encircled by a dark bluish ring. The dorsal fin contains 14 spines and 16–17 soft rays while the anal fin has 3 spines and 17–18 soft rays. This species attains a maximum total length of 10 centimetres (3.9 in).

== Distribution ==
The Golden angelfish is found in the Western Pacific Ocean. Its range extends from eastern Indonesia through Papua New Guinea and the Solomon Islands east to Fiji and Samoa. It occurs as far south as Australia where it has been recorded at Carter Reef off Queensland.

== Habitat and biology ==
The golden angelfish inhabits areas with many coral reefs and rocky outcrops, often hiding in crevices surrounded by sponges. It is an omnivore, feeding on algae, detritus and invertebrates. This is a shy species which is only infrequently observed by divers. It is found at depths of 3 to 20 metres (9.8 to 65.6 ft).

== Systematics ==
The Golden angelfish was first formally described in 1974 by John E. Randall (1924–2020) and Richard C Wass with the type locality given as Pago Pago Harbor, Tutuila, Aua Reef in American Samoa. Some authorities place this species in the subgenus Centropyge. The specific name aurantia means "orange", referring to the overall colour of this fish.

== Utilisation ==
The golden angelfish is rarely found in the aquarium trade.
