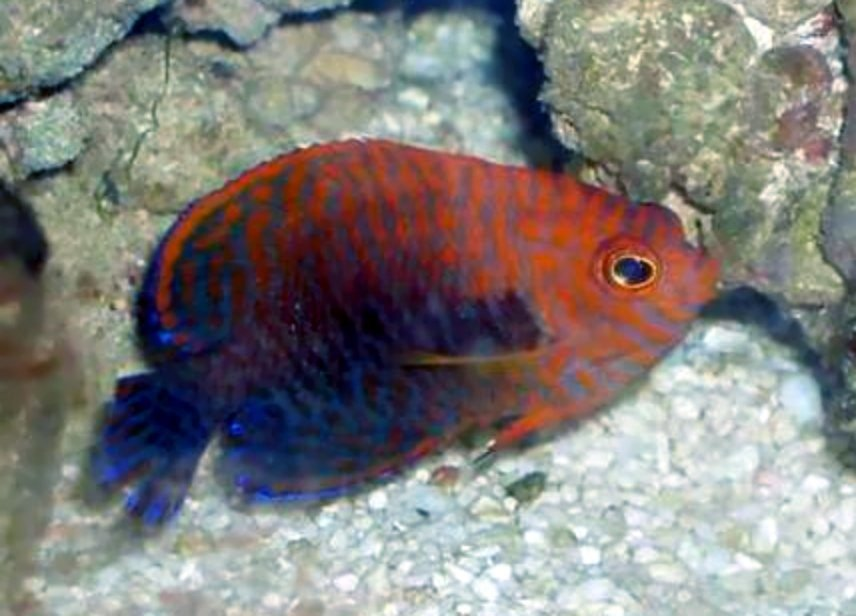

Conservation status
- Least Concern (IUCN 3.1)

Scientific classification
- Kingdom: Animalia
- Phylum: Chordata
- Class: Actinopterygii
- Division: Teleostei
- Order: Acanthuriformes
- Family: Pomacanthidae
- Genus: Centropyge
- Species: C. potteri

Binomial name
- Centropyge potteri (Jordan & Metz, 1912)

Synonyms
- Holacanthus potteri Jordan & Metz, 1912

= Centropyge potteri =

Species of fish

Centropyge potteri, commonly known as the russet angelfish, Potter's angelfish, or Potter's pygmy angelfish, is a species of marine ray-finned fish, a marine angelfish belonging to the family Pomacanthidae. It is found in the central Pacific Ocean.

== Description ==
Centropyge potteri has a bright orange body marked with thin vertical stripes, which are blue to black in colour. The dorsal, caudal, and anal fins have a vivid blue margin, while the pectoral and pelvic fins are orange to bright yellow in colour. The males have a wider area of blue in the middle of the body, which extends down onto the belly. There is a deep water vivid blue colour morph in which the stripes are black or purple that has black to burgundy stripes, which occurs at depths below 60 metres (200 ft). This species attains a maximum total length of 10 centimetres (3.9 in).

== Distribution ==
Centropyge potteri is found in the central Pacific Ocean where it is found around the Hawaiian Islands and Johnston Atoll.

== Habitat and biology ==
Centropyge potteri is found at depths between 10 and 120 metres (33 and 394 ft). This species lives in areas of rock, coral, or rubble on seaward reefs. Juveniles are occasionally recorded in waters as shallow as 5 metres (16 ft). It is a benthopelagic species that feeds on algae and detritus. They may live in small social groups, harems with a single male and up to 8 females. They are protogynous hermaphrodites, and if no male is present, the dominant female will change sex. Spawning takes place between December and May and usually occurs around nightfall. A spawning pair will select a high outcropping of rock in their territory to spawn over. The male initiates courtship by approaching the female and swimming alongside the female in a vertical position and using a smooth sinuous motion. He then moves to be above the female, halts, raises his dorsal and anal fin, starts to flutter the pectoral fins, and makes a slight sideward turn before starting to drift slowly. If he does not elicit a response, he will start again with the sinuous swimming notion, repeating until the female responds. When they are ready to mate, the red colouration becomes more intense, and the pair make audible grunts and clicks. The male will then draw the female to the selected outcropping and will continue the display around 90 cm above it. When the female adopts the position that indicates she is ready to mate, the male briefly nuzzles her vent until she releases the eggs. The male then immediately releases his milt and then both fish dive for cover, the female chasing the male and nipping at his caudal fin. They then go to their nighttime shelter.

== Systematics ==
Centropyge potteri was first formally described in 1912 by the American ichthyologists David Starr Jordan (1851-1931) and Charles William Metz (1889-1975) with the type locality given as Honolulu on Oahu. The specific name honours Frederick A. Potter the first director of the Waikiki Aquarium , ho held the post from 1904 to 1940. Some authorities place this species in the subgenus Centropyge.

== Utilisation ==
Centropyge potteri appears in the aquarium trade.
