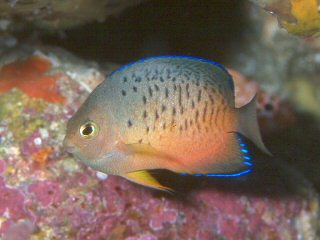

Conservation status
- Least Concern (IUCN 3.1)

Scientific classification
- Kingdom: Animalia
- Phylum: Chordata
- Class: Actinopterygii
- Order: Acanthuriformes
- Family: Pomacanthidae
- Genus: Centropyge
- Species: C. ferrugata

Binomial name
- Centropyge ferrugata Randall & Burgess, 1972

= Centropyge ferrugata =

Species of fish

Centropyge ferrugata, the rusty angelfish, is a species of marine ray-finned fish, a marine angelfish belonging to the family Pomacanthidae. The rusty angelfish comes from the Western Pacific Ocean and sometimes makes its way into the aquarium trade.

== Description ==
Centropyge ferrugata has a brownish-orange body marked with black spots on the upper flanks. The caudal, dorsal and anal fins have a bright blue margin. The dorsal fin contains 14 spines and 17 soft rays while the anal fin has 3 spines and 17-18 soft rays. This species attains a maximum total length of 10 centimetres (3.9 in).

== Distribution ==
Centropyge ferrugata is found in the western Pacific Ocean. Its range extends from Tanabe Bay southern Japan to southern Taiwan and the Philippines.

== Habitat and biology ==
Centropyge ferrugata is found at depths between 6 and 30 metres (20 and 98 ft). They live on seaward rocky reefs and in areas of rubble, particularly with dense algal growth. The fish can be found living alone as a solitary species or living in small groups. It is frequently observed grazing on mats of filamentous algae. It also eats detritus, coral polyps, sponges and small gastropods. This species is a protogynous hermaphrodite, the dominant female in a group will change sex if there is no male.

== Systematics ==
Centropyge ferrugata was first formally described in 1972 by John Ernest Randall (1924-2020) and Warren E. Burgess with the type locality given as a reef one half mile off the harbour of Ishigaki City, Ishigaki, Ryukyu Islands. Within the genus Centropyge this species is considered, by some authorities, to be in the subgenus Centropyge.

== Utilisation ==
Centropyge ferrugata is found in the aquarium trade and it has been bred and successfully reared in captivity.
