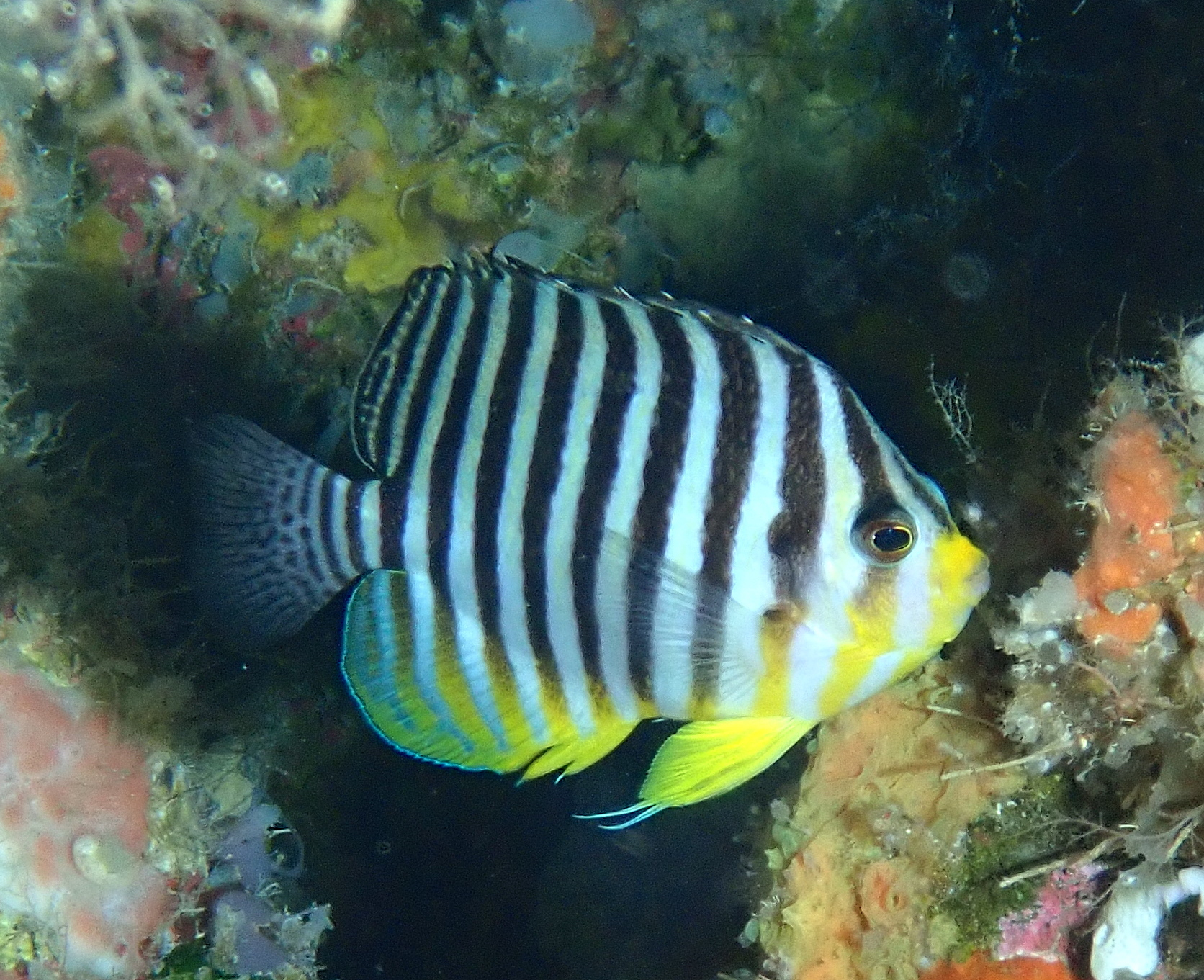

Conservation status
- Least Concern (IUCN 3.1)

Scientific classification
- Kingdom: Animalia
- Phylum: Chordata
- Class: Actinopterygii
- Order: Acanthuriformes
- Family: Pomacanthidae
- Genus: Paracentropyge; Burgess, 1991
- Species: P. multifasciata

Binomial name
- Paracentropyge multifasciata (Smith & Radcliffe, 1911)

Synonyms
- Centropyge multifasciata Smith & Radcliffe, 1911; Holacanthus multifasciatus Smith & Radcliffe, 1911

= Paracentropyge multifasciata =

Species of fish

Paracentropyge multifasciata, the barred angelfish, banded pygmy-angelfish, many-banded angelfish, multi-banded angelfish or multibarred angelfish, is a species of marine ray-finned fish, a marine angelfish, belonging to the family Pomacanthidae. It is native to the Indo-Pacific.

== Description ==
Paracentropyge multifasciata has a white background colour on the body with 8 black vertical bars, these change colour to yellowish as they approach the ventral part of the body. There is also an obvious black spot on the posterior portion of the dorsal fin which fades as the fish ages. The mouth, as well as the pelvic and anal fin are yellow. Each spine in the dorsal fin is tipped with a single thin thread with a pair of these threads on the tips of the pelvic fins. The caudal fin is hyaline marked with a line of black spots. The juveniles have less distinct band. The dorsal fin contains 13 spines and 17-19 soft rays while the anal fin has 3 spines and 17-18 soft rays. This species attains a maximum total length of 12 centimetres (4.7 in).

== Distribution ==
Paracentropyge multifasciata is found in the Indo-Pacific region. Here it ranges from the Australian territory of the Cocos (Keeling) Islands in the west east to the Society Islands in French Polynesia. It extends north to the southern Ryukyu Islands of Japan and south to the Great Barrier Reef of Queensland.

== Habitat and biology ==
Paracentropyge multifasciata is found at depths of between 7 and 70 metres (23 and 230 ft). It is found under overhangs and in the caves and crevices on the steep outer slopesof reefs and it is sometimes recorded in reefs in the clear waters of lagoons. It is a cryptic species which rarely moves more than a short distance from a hiding place. They are typically encountered in pairs or small groups. It is thought to feed on algae, sponges, tunicates and a variety of crustaceans. This species lives in harems with one dominant male and usually multiple females. Like all other angelfish it is a protogynous hermaphrodite, with all individuals being female initially and the dominant ones changing to males. They are broadcast spawners, releasing the eggs and sperm into the water following a lengthy mating ritual. The eggs are 0.7mm in diameter and hatch after 16–18 hours. The larvae have a pelagic phase lasting up to 50 days, after which they settle into a benthic phase and commence metamorphosis into juveniles.

== Systematics ==
Paracentropyge multifasciata was first formally described as Holocanthus multifasciatus in 1911 by the American ichthyologists Hugh McCormick Smith (1869-1941) and Lewis Radcliffe (1880-1950) with the type locality given as Puerto Galera on Mindoro in the Philippines. When Warren E. Burgess created the genus Paracentropyge he named H. multifasciatus as its type species. Paracentropyge is considered to be a subgenus of Centropyge by many authorities. They then add Centropyge venusta and C. boylei to the subgenus or genus. Accordingly this species is then Centropyge multifasciata.

== In the aquarium ==
This species is one of the medium priced dwarf angelfish with sales prices usually ranging from $50 to $100 per specimen (2010). Availability may vary but P. multifasciata cannot be considered "rare" in the trade. They usually arrive in fish stores in good health, problems can however arise when keeping them in sterile quarantine settings without live rock where not enough food can be found, as barred angelfish often do not accept artificial or frozen foods initially. Aquarists will therefore have to weigh the risks of skipping quarantine. Applying freshwater dips before placing P. multifasciata in their tanks is usually sufficient to prevent the introduction of protozoans via these fish.

Barred angelfish are social fish and should be kept in pairs or larger groups in large enough reef tank settings. Keeping more than one specimen also facilitates weaning them onto frozen or prepared foods (pelleted fish food or flakes, Artemia, Mysis, mussels and fresh oysters). After introduction to the tank P. multifasciata can be quite shy and reclusive, but when they have established their territory this will almost always improve. Outgoing but not too aggressive tank mates, such as for example surgeonfish or butterflyfish can help with overcoming timidness. When keeping barred angelfish with other species of angelfishes, the different levels of aggressiveness of the different species have to be taken into account, as P. multifasciata is one of the less aggressive members of the genus.
