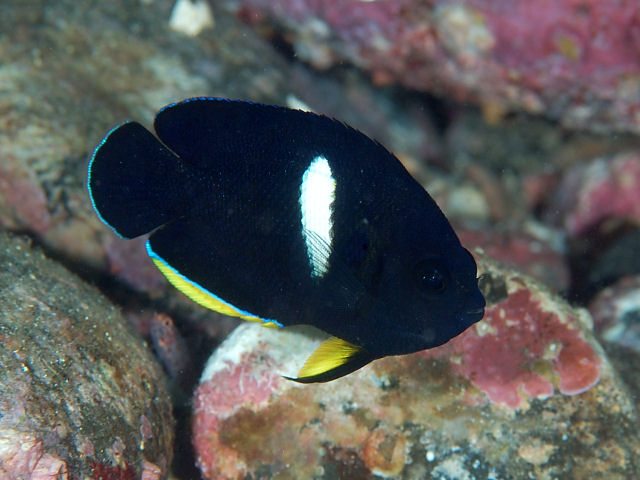

Conservation status
- Least Concern (IUCN 3.1)

Scientific classification
- Kingdom: Animalia
- Phylum: Chordata
- Class: Actinopterygii
- Order: Acanthuriformes
- Family: Pomacanthidae
- Genus: Centropyge
- Species: C. tibicen

Binomial name
- Centropyge tibicen (Cuvier, 1831)

Synonyms
- Holacanthus tibicen Cuvier, 1831

= Centropyge tibicen =

Species of fish

Centropyge tibicen, the keyhole angelfish, black angelfish, whitespot angelfish or puller angelfish, is a species of marine ray-finned fish, a marine angelfish belonging to the family Pomacanthidae. It is found in the Indo-Pacific region.

== Description ==
Centropyge tibicen is mainly black in colour, the adults have an elongated vertical black blotch in the centre of the upper flanks. Smaller fish are mainly black with a white vertical bar which changes to a central blotch and becomes highly variable in form and extent. The dorsal and anal fins have a blue line just below their margin. Much of the pelvic and the front part of the anal fin are yellow. The caudal fin has a blue line which is positioned submarginally. The dorsal fin contains 14 spines and 15-16 soft rays while the anal fin has 3 spines and 16-17 soft rays. This species attains a maximum total length of 19 centimetres (7.5 in).

== Distribution ==
Centropyge tibicen is found in the Indo-Pacific region. It occurs from the northwestern coast of Australia and Christmas Island through the Indo-Australian Archipelago to Vanuatu and Tonga in the east. Its range extends as far north as southern Japan and Taiwan and to Lord Howe Island.

== Habitat and biology ==
Centropyge tibicen is found at depths between 4 and 35 metres (13 and 115 ft). It is an uncommon species of areas where there is a mixture of coral and rubble on both lagoon and seaward reefs. It is herbivorous and algae dominates its diet. It lives in harems of 3-7 fishes. This species is able to change sex from female to male, when there is no male in a harem, one of the females changes sex.

== Systematics ==
Centropyge tibicen was first formally described as Holocanthus tibicen in 1831 by the French anatomist Georges Cuvier (1769-1832). The specific name tibicen means "trumpeter", this is thought to be alluding to the name given to this species by the Dutch naturalist François Valentijn (1666-1727) in 1726, Japonfche Trompetter. When Johann Jakob Kaup described the genus Centropyge in 1860 he named Cuvier's H. tibicen as the type species. As the type species it is placed in the subgenus Centropyge.

== Utilisation ==
Centropyge tibicen is frequently found in the aquarium trade, but does not tolerate Ionic copper medications very well. It is recommended to use Ionic copper treatments only, or rather, a less harsh procedure such as the Hybrid Tank Transfer method.
