= Centropyge woodheadi =

Scientific classification
- Kingdom: Animalia
- Phylum: Chordata
- Class: Actinopterygii
- Order: Acanthuriformes
- Family: Pomacanthidae
- Genus: Centropyge
- Species: C. woodheadi

Binomial name
- Centropyge woodheadi (Kuiter, 1998)

Species of fish

Centropyge woodheadi, the black-fin pygmy angelfish, is a species of marine angelfish in the family Pomacanthidae, found in the Southwestern Pacific from the Great Barrier Reef to the Gambier archipelago.
