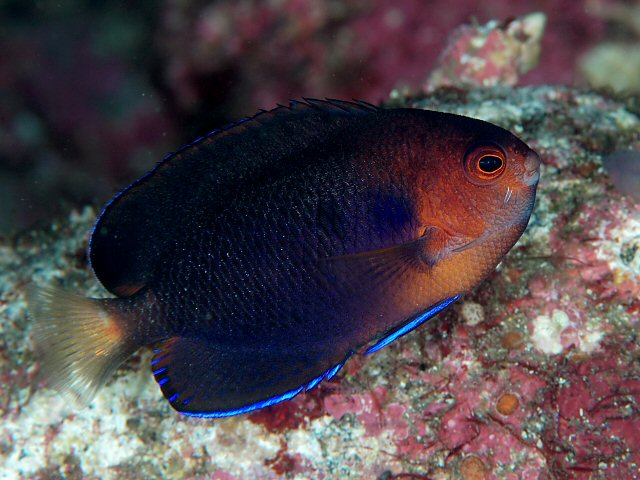

Conservation status
- Least Concern (IUCN 3.1)

Scientific classification
- Kingdom: Animalia
- Phylum: Chordata
- Class: Actinopterygii
- Order: Acanthuriformes
- Family: Pomacanthidae
- Genus: Centropyge
- Species: C. fisheri

Binomial name
- Centropyge fisheri (Snyder, 1904)

Synonyms
- Holacanthus fisheri Snyder, 1904; Centropyge flavicauda Fraser-Brunner, 1933; Centropyge caudoxanthorus S. C. Shen, 1973

= Centropyge fisheri =

Species of fish

Centropyge fisheri, the orange angelfish, whitetail angelfish, damsel angelfish, yellowtail angelfish, Hawaiian flame angelfish, Fisher's angelfish, Fisher's dwarf angelfish or Fisher's pygmy angelfish, is a species of marine ray-finned fish, a marine angelfish belonging to the family Pomacanthidae. It is found in the Indo-Pacific region.

== Description ==
Centropyge fisheri varies in colour from deep blue to orange-brown. The caudal fin is whitish to pale yellow and is almost transparent. The dorsal, anal and pelvic fins have vivid blue margins and there are blue streaks along the posterior edge of the dorsal and anal fins. This species attains a maximum total length of 8.4 centimetres (3.3 in).

== Distribution ==
Centropyge fisheri has a wide Indo-Pacific distribution. It is found on the East African coast in Somalia, Kenya and Tanzania across the Indian Ocean and into the Pacific Ocean as far as Hawaii and Johnston Atoll and Tuamotu. Its range extends north to southern Japan and south to the Great Barrier Reef. In Australia it can be found at Christmas Island and the Cocos (Keeling) Islands as well as on the reefs off Western Australia, in the Timor Sea and on the east coast as far south as Cook Island in New South Wales while juveniles reach as far south as Bass Point.

== Habitat and biology ==
Centropyge fisheri is found at depths between 3 and 60 metres (9.8 and 196.9 ft). It is a species of reefs where it can be found in the coral rich bottoms of channels, reef slopes and areas of rubble. It is frequently found in areas of brittle corals and coralline algae which it shares with damselfish and smaller wrasses. It is typically encountered in small groups. Its diet is mainly algae but some worms and crustaceans are consumed. This species is a protogynous hermaphrodite, the dominant female in a group will change sex if there is no male.

== Systematics ==
Centropyge fisheri was first formally described as Holocanthus fisheri in 1904 by the American ichthyologist John Otterbein Snyder (1867-1943) with the type locality given as off Diamond Head on Oahu in Hawaii. The specific name honours the zoologist Walter Kenrick Fisher (1878-1953) of Stanford University. Within the genus Centropyge this species is considered, by some authorities, to be in the subgenus Xiphypops. C. fisheri was considered to be restricted to Hawaii but the more widespread C. flavicauda is now considered to be synonymous with it.
