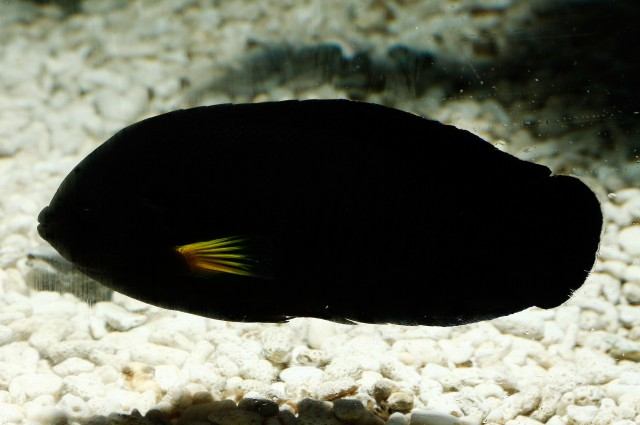

Conservation status
- Least Concern (IUCN 3.1)

Scientific classification
- Kingdom: Animalia
- Phylum: Chordata
- Class: Actinopterygii
- Order: Acanthuriformes
- Family: Pomacanthidae
- Genus: Centropyge
- Species: C. flavipectoralis

Binomial name
- Centropyge flavipectoralis Randall & Klausewitz, 1977

= Centropyge flavipectoralis =

Species of fish

Centropyge flavipectoralis, known commonly as the yellowfin angelfish or moonbeam angelfish, is a marine ray-finned fish, a marine angelfish belonging to the family Pomacanthidae. It is native to the Indian Ocean.

== Description ==
Centropyge flavipectoralis is largely brown in colour marked on the flanks with metallic blue stripes. The pectoral fin is yellow. The dorsal fin contains 14–15 spines and 14–15 soft rays while the anal fin has three spines and 16–18 soft rays. This species attains a maximum total length of 10 centimetres (3.9 in).

== Distribution ==
Centropyge flavipectoralis is found in the Indian Ocean in the Maldives, Sri Lanka and the Andaman Sea from Thailand south to northern Sumatra.

== Habitat and biology ==
Centropyge flavipectoralis is found at depths between 3 and 20 metres (9.8 and 65.6 ft). This species occurs in areas of rubble with limited growth of coral. It is usually encountered in small groups on seabeds with some cover. Its diet is mainly algae, worms and crustaceans.

== Systematics ==
Centropyge flavipectoralis was first formally described in 1977 by the American ichthyologist John Ernest Randall (1924-2020) and his German colleague Wolfgang Klausewitz (1922-2018) with the type locality given as Lively Rock at Trincomalee in Sri Lanka. The specific name flavipectoralis means "yellow pectoral" referring to the colour of the pectoral fins. Within the genus Centropyge this species is considered, by some authorities, to be in the subgenus Centropyge.

== Utilisation ==
Centropyge flavipectoralis is infrequent in the aquarium trade. It is reputed to be a hardy species in captivity but its relative drabness reduces demand.
