= Centropyge nahackyi =

Conservation status
- Near Threatened (IUCN 3.1)

Scientific classification
- Kingdom: Animalia
- Phylum: Chordata
- Class: Actinopterygii
- Order: Acanthuriformes
- Family: Pomacanthidae
- Genus: Centropyge
- Species: C. nahackyi

Binomial name
- Centropyge nahackyi Kosaki, 1989

Species of ray-finned fish

Centropyge nahackyi, also called Nahacky's angelfish, is a small pygmy angelfish found on deeper drop-offs around Johnston Island and Hawaii.

Centropyge nahackyi are known for their bright and vibrant colors which are highly valuable in aquarium trading.

== Description ==
Centropyge nahackyi are characterized by their small mouth located in the front of their head. Its jaw teeth are slender, elongated, and broadly rounded, and positioned closely together. This allows them to have flexibility when it comes to jaw movements. Notably, there are no teeth on the roof of its mouth. Their tongues are short and rounded. Centropyge nahackyi has a head profile that resembles a "bispinosa" complex, with the area above its eyes becoming more concave as it grows. With a dark body, Centropyge nahackyi displays a blue and brown color on the back of its tail. It carries color patterns such as black and blue nape bars, yellow thorax, and a yellow tail base. Centropyge nahackyi stands apart visually from similar species due to consistent and noticeable differences. These variations are from the gently sloping patterns that it possesses, giving this fish a unique appearance.

== Habitat ==
Centropyge nahackyi are native to Johnston Atoll, but from research around the Hawaiian Islands, scientists discovered a single specimen around the islands. This finding could be a waif discovery, or a stray occurrence of C. nahackyi. Centropyge nahackyi is primarily found in environments with deep reefs that consist of eroded limestone. Centropyge nahackyi can be found in depths of 41–70 meters. They have a maximum abundance of 0.12 per meter squared.

== Human Use ==
In the aquarium trade, due to its vibrant colors, Centropyge nahackyi can be sold for thousands of U.S dollars.
