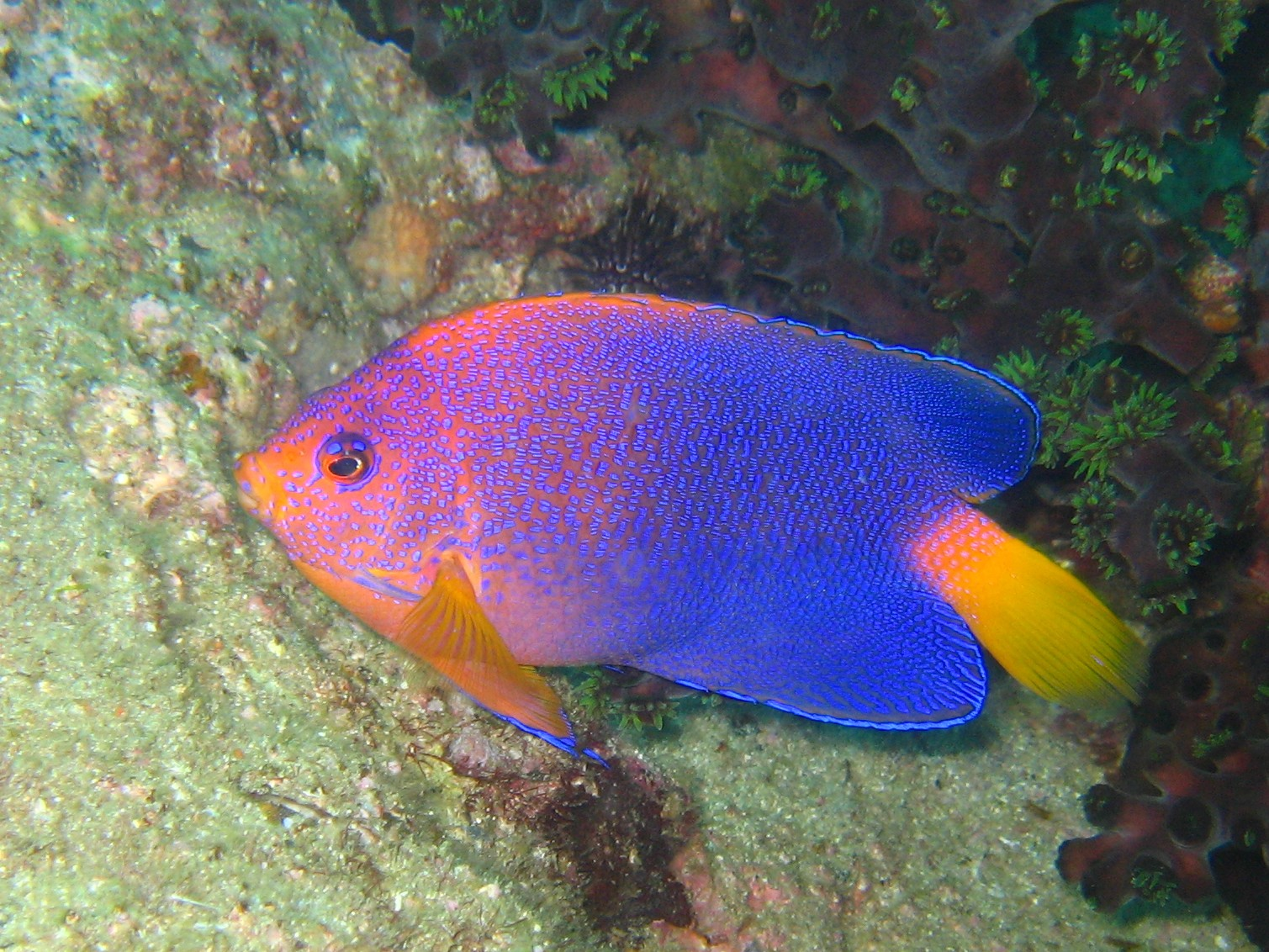

Conservation status
- Least Concern (IUCN 3.1)

Scientific classification
- Kingdom: Animalia
- Phylum: Chordata
- Class: Actinopterygii
- Division: Teleostei
- Order: Acanthuriformes
- Family: Pomacanthidae
- Genus: Centropyge
- Species: C. interrupta

Binomial name
- Centropyge interrupta (Tanaka, 1918)

Synonyms
- Angelichthys interruptus Tanaka, 1918; Centropyge interruptus (Tanaka, 1918)

= Japanese angelfish =

Species of fish

The Japanese angelfish (Centropyge interrupta) or Japanese pygmy angelfish, is a species of marine ray-finned fish, a marine angelfish belonging to the family Pomacanthidae. It is found in the western Pacific Ocean.

== Description ==
The Japanese angelfish has an orange body marked with purple and blue spots It has an orangey yellow body with purplish blue spots completed with a bright yellow tail. The spots are larger towards the tail, and the bottom part the rear of the fish gradually becomes purple. The spots also turn from blue to purple towards the tail. Juveniles has a blue margined black ocellus on the posterior part of the dorsal fin. The dorsal fin contains 14 spines and 16 soft rays while the anal fin has 3 spines and 17 soft rays. This species attains a maximum total length of 15 centimetres (5.9 in).

== Distribution ==
The Japanese angelfish is found in the western Pacific Ocean. They occur in southern Japan from Tokyo to Shikoku, as well as around the Izu Islands and the Ogasawara Islands south of Japan. They also occur in United States waters around Midway Atoll and Kure Atoll and reaching south to Pearl and Hermes Atoll.

== Habitat and biology ==
The Japanese angelfish is found at depths between 15 and 60 metres (49 and 197 ft). They are typically encountered as pairs on rocky reefs where there are rich growths of coral and algae. Their diet consists of algae, benthic invertebrates and sponges. They are oviparous and monogamous. Females change sex to males at a total length of 12.7 centimetres (5.0 in) and this takes 20–39 days to complete.

== Systematics ==
The Japanese angelfish was first formally described in 1918 by the Japanese ichthyologist Shigeho Tanaka (1878-1974) with the type locality given as Tanabe in the Wakayama Prefecture of Japan. The specific name means "interrupted" and was not explained but may refer to the broken dusky bars on the head. Within the genus Centropyge this species is considered, by some authorities, to be in the subgenus Centropyge.

== Utilisation ==
The Japanese angelfish is not common in the aquarium trade although it does well in captivity and has been successfully bred and reared in captivity. They can command high prices within the trade.
