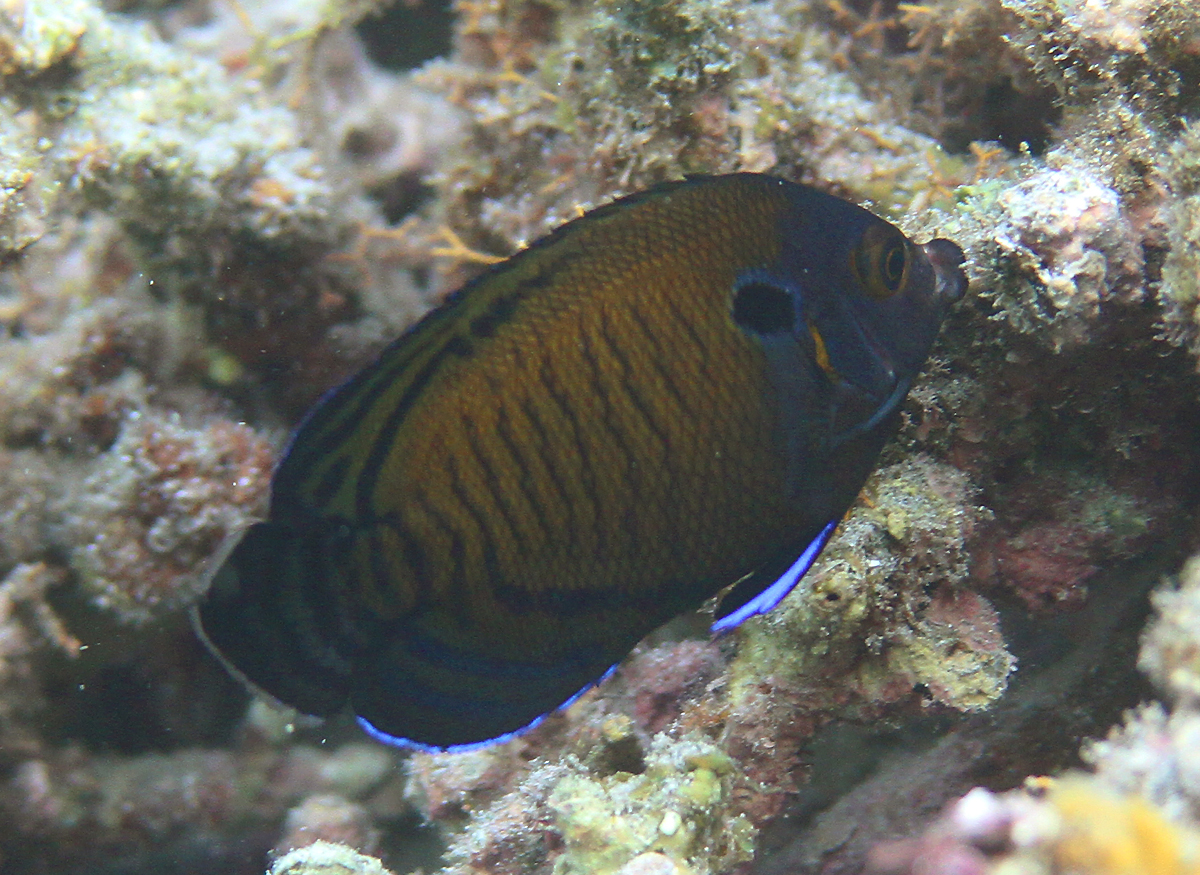

Conservation status
- Least Concern (IUCN 3.1)

Scientific classification
- Kingdom: Animalia
- Phylum: Chordata
- Class: Actinopterygii
- Order: Acanthuriformes
- Family: Pomacanthidae
- Genus: Centropyge
- Species: C. multispinis

Binomial name
- Centropyge multispinis (Playfair, 1867)

Synonyms
- Holacanthus multispinis Playfair, 1867

= Centropyge multispinis =

Species of fish

Centropyge multispinis, known by the common names bluefin dwarf, brown pygmy angelfish, dusky angelfish, dusky cherub, many-spined angelfish, and multispined angelfish, is a species of marine ray finned fish, a marine angelfish belonging to the family Pomacanthidae. It is found in tropical waters of the Indo-Pacific area.

== Description ==
Centropyge multispinis has a body which has a dusky background colour marked with black vertical bars along he flanks. The rear dorsal and anal fins have bright blue margins. The dorsal fin contains 14 spines and 15-17 soft rays while the anal fin has 3 spines and 16-17 soft rays. This species attains a maximum total length of 14 centimetres (5.5 in).

== Distribution ==
Centropyge multispinis is found in the northern and western Indian Ocean. It is found on the eastern coast of Africa including the Red Sea and across the Indian Ocean to Thailand and Sumatra. Its presence in Madagascar has to be confirmed and there is a record from Darwin, Northern Territory, which possibly represents a misidentification.

== Habitat and biology ==
Centropyge multispinis is found at depths between 1 and 30 metres (3.3 and 98.4 ft) where. It occurs copper areas of rubble in the vicinity of coral reefs, although it may also be found in lagoon reefs and outer reef slopes. In the Indian Oceanthis is one of the commonest species of angelfish. Its diet is made up of algae and detritus. This species is a protogynous hermaphrodite and has the ability to change sex from female to male. When there is no male present one of the females will change into a male.

== Systematics ==
Centropyge multispinis was first formally described in 1867 by the Scottish naturalist Lambert Playfair (1828-1899) with the type locality given as Zanzibar. The specific name, multispinis, refers to the 2-4 spines on the interoperculum. Some authorities place this species in the subgenus Centropyge.

== Utlisation ==
Centropyge multispinis is infrequently available in the aquarium trade.
