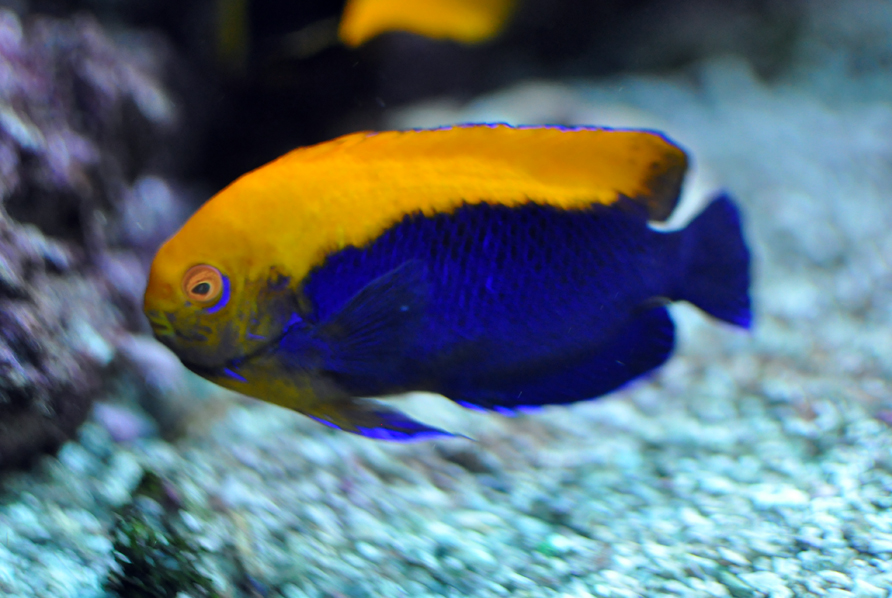

Conservation status
- Least Concern (IUCN 3.1)

Scientific classification
- Kingdom: Animalia
- Phylum: Chordata
- Class: Actinopterygii
- Order: Acanthuriformes
- Family: Pomacanthidae
- Genus: Centropyge
- Species: C. aurantonotus

Binomial name
- Centropyge aurantonotus W. E. Burgess, 1974

= Flameback angelfish =

Species of fish

The flameback angelfish (Centropyge aurantonotus), also known as the flameback pygmy angelfish, Brazilian flameback angelfish, Caribbean flameback angelfish or fireball angelfish, is a species of marine ray-finned fish, a marine angelfish belonging to the family Pomacanthidae. It is found in the western Atlantic Ocean.

== Description ==
The flameback angelfish has an oval, deep and laterally compressed body with a short, blunt snout and a small mouth. There is a long, robust spine at the angle of the preopercle with vertical margin serrated. To the rear of the bone below the eye there are 2 large, rear-pointing spines and a series of smaller spines on the preopercle and on the opercle. It has a mainly blue body with the head and dorsal region being bright, golden yellow. It also has a blue ring around the eyes. The caudal and the anal fins are dark blue marked with many black spots. The dorsal fin contains 14-15 spines and 15-16 soft rays while the anal fin has 3 spines and 17 soft rays. This species attains a maximum total length of 7.5 centimetres (3.0 in).

== Distribution ==
The flameback angelfish is found in the tropical Western Atlantic Ocean. It occurs from the Lesser Antilles and Curaçao in the Netherlands Antilles and along the northern coast of South America from Venezuela to southern Brazil. It has been recorded in the eastern Atlantic at São Tomé in the Gulf of Guinea.

== Habitat and biology ==
The flameback angelfish is found. At depths of between 15 and 300 metres (49 and 984 ft) where it is found in areas of reef and rock rubble. It may also be common around isolated patches of staghorn coral (Acropora cervicornis). It feels on algae and sponges. Like other angelfish the flameback angelfish lays pelagic eggs and has pelagic larvae.

== Systematics ==
The flameback angelfish was first formally described in 1974 by Warren E. Burgess with the type locality given as off Oistins in Barbados. In some classifications it is placed in the subgenus Xiphipops.The specific name is a compound of aurantia meaning "orange" and notus meaning "back" and refers to the golden-orange back shown by this species.

== Utlisation ==
The flameback angelfish is popular in the aquarium trade and in the 20th Century thousands were exported from Brazil.
