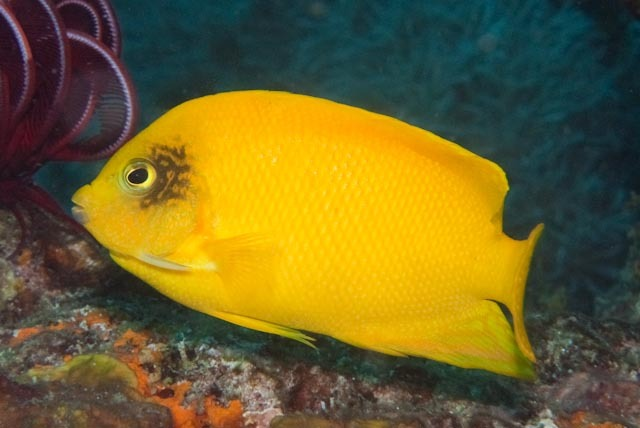

Conservation status
- Least Concern (IUCN 3.1)

Scientific classification
- Kingdom: Animalia
- Phylum: Chordata
- Class: Actinopterygii
- Order: Acanthuriformes
- Family: Pomacanthidae
- Genus: Centropyge
- Species: C. heraldi

Binomial name
- Centropyge heraldi Woods & Schultz, 1953

Synonyms
- Pomacanthus heraldi (Woods & Schultz, 1953)

= Centropyge heraldi =

Species of fish

Centropyge heraldi, the yellow angelfish or Herald's angelfish is a species of marine ray-finned fish, a marine angelfish belonging to the family Pomacanthidae. It comes from the Pacific Ocean and sometimes makes its way into the aquarium trade.

== Etymology ==
The angelfish is named after Earl Stannard Herald. He died in Cabo San Lucas, Baja California, in a scuba diving accident.

== Description ==
Centropyge heraldi is a yellowish orange fish. There is a patch of darker olive, with some spots concolorous with the body, within it around the eye. The dorsal fin contains 15 spines and 15 soft rays while the anal fin has 3 spines and 17 soft rays. This species attains a maximum total length of 12 centimetres (4.7 in).

== Distribution ==
Centropyge heraldi has a wide range in the Western and Central Pacific Ocean. This range extends from southern Japan and Taiwan east as far as the Tuamotu Islands and south to Australia. In Australia it can be found along the Great Barrier Reef south to the Solitary Islands in New South Wales, as well as on some Coral Sea reefs.

== Habitat and biology ==
Centropyge heraldi is found at depths between 8 and 45 metres (26 and 148 ft) and is most commonly recorded on outer reef slopes, and occasionally on lagoon reefs. This species is usually found in small harems of a male and one to three females. Females may change to males when there is no male present. It is a herbivorous species which feeds on filamentous algae.

== Systematics ==
Centropyge heraldi was first formally described in 1953 by the Americans Loren Paul Woods (1914-1979) and Leonard Peter Schultz (1901-1986) with the type locality given as Bikini Atoll in the Marshall Islands. The specific name honours the American ichthyologist and public aquarium director Earl Stannard Herald (1914-1973) who assisted in the collection of the type. Within the genus Centropyge this species is considered, by some authorities, to be in the subgenus Centropyge.

== Utilisation ==
Centropyge heraldi sometimes appears in the aquarium trade.
