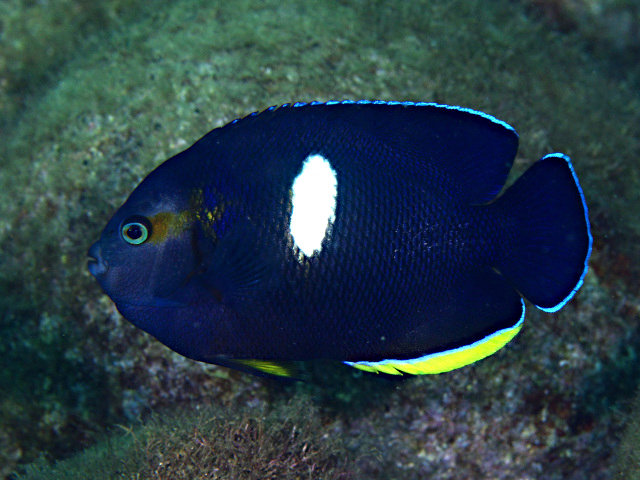
- Centropyge tibicen

Scientific classification
- Kingdom: Animalia
- Phylum: Chordata
- Class: Actinopterygii
- Order: Acanthuriformes
- Family: Pomacanthidae
- Genus: Centropyge; Kaup, 1860

Type species
- Holacanthus tibicen Cuvier 1831

Synonyms
- Paradiretmus Whitley, 1948; Sumireyakko Burgess, 1991; Xiphypops D.S. Jordan, 1922

= Centropyge =

Genus of fishes

Centropyge is a genus of ray-finned fish, marine angelfish belonging to the family Pomacanthidae found in the Atlantic, Indian and Pacific Ocean. These species do not exceed 15 cm in length and live in haremic structures with one dominant male and multiple females.

== Taxonomy ==
Centropyge is a paraphyletic genus. This is because Genicanthus and the polyphyletic genus Apolemichthys are nested within Centropyge.

Centropyge includes 3 subgenera and several species complexes. The subgenus Xiphypops only comprises all species within the C. acanthops complex, which include C. acanthops, C. argi, C. aurantonota, C. resplendens. Subgenus Paracentropyge comprises C. boylei, C. multifasciata, and C. venusta. These two subgenera are monophyletic and there is support for their elevation to genus status. All other species currently fall under the nominate subgenus Centropyge, which is not monophyletic. Different studies have designated different species complexes within Centropyge, based on differing definitions of the term 'species complex'.

== Biology ==
Although it is difficult to distinguish the sexes, females are often shorter and more round finned. Like many other reef fish and all marine angelfish, the species in this genus are protogynous hermaphrodites, meaning that they start their adult lives as females and the dominant individual in a group can change to a male within days. A reversal of this sex change is possible if the social status of the individual changes, it is however a process that requires much more time. Uniquely amongst protogynous fish, males of at least one species of Centropyge (C. ferrugata) are capable of reversing sex change and changing back into females.

== In aquaria ==
This genus prefer matured reef tanks due to the usually high water quality and the often used "live rock". In nature most species feed on algae, sponges and small benthic invertebrates. Having an abundance of well cured live rock will help to supplement their diet. This is also in the interest of the aquarist, as underfed Centropyge angels may nip at corals and sessile invertebrates. Dwarf angels can be quite shy initially, hiding in corals, caves and crevices but become more outgoing when they have established their territory - if they are kept with appropriate tank mates and in appropriately sized tanks.

== Species ==
There are currently 35 recognized species in this genus:

Image	Scientific name	Common name	Distribution
	Centropyge abei G. R. Allen, Young & P. L. Colin, 2006	Abe's pygmy angelfish	Western Pacific Ocean, amongst the islands of Indonesia and Palau
	Centropyge acanthops (Norman, 1922)	Orange-back pygmy angelfish	East coast of Africa,
	Centropyge argi Woods & Kanazawa, 1951	Cherub pygmy angelfish	The Caribbean and Gulf of Mexico, North to North Carolina.
	Centropyge aurantia J. E. Randall & Wass, 1974	Golden pygmy angelfish	The western Pacific Ocean: Indonesia and the Great Barrier Reef.
	Centropyge aurantonotus W. E. Burgess, 1974	Flame-back pygmy angelfish	southern Caribbean Sea and the coastal waters of Brazil
	Centropyge bicolor (Bloch, 1787)	Bicolor pygmy angelfish	Indo-Pacific region: including East Africa, Southern Japan, Australia, and even Fiji.
	Centropyge bispinosa (Günther, 1860)	Two-spined pygmy angelfish	Indo-Pacific
	Centropyge boylei Pyle & J. E. Randall, 1992	Peppermint pygmy angelfish	Eastern-central Pacific around the Cook Islands and Rarotonga
	Centropyge cocosensis K. N. Shen, C. W. Chang, Delrieu-Trottin & Borsa, 2016	Cocos pygmy angelfish	Eastern Indian Ocean: Cocos (Keeling) Islands and Christmas Island.
	Centropyge colini Smith-Vaniz & J. E. Randall, 1974	Cocos-Keeling angelfish	Indo-west Pacific Ocean, including around the Cocos (Keeling) Islands
	Centropyge debelius Pyle, 1990	Blue Mauritius pygmy angelfish	Western Indian Ocean: Mauritius, Réunion, and the Aldabra Group (Seychelles).
	Centropyge deborae K. N. Shen, H. C. Ho & C. W. Chang, 2012	Blue velvet pygmy angelfish	Fiji
	Centropyge eibli Klausewitz, 1963	Black-tail pygmy angelfish	The Indo-Pacific.
	Centropyge ferrugata J. E. Randall & W. E. Burgess, 1972	Rusty pygmy angelfish	Western Pacific Ocean
	Centropyge fisheri (Snyder, 1904)	Orange pygmy angelfish	Hawaii.
	Centropyge flavipectoralis J. E. Randall & Klausewitz, 1977	Yellow-fin pygmy angelfish	Indian Ocean
	Centropyge flavissima (G. Cuvier, 1831)	Lemon-peel pygmy angelfish	Indo-Pacific region
	Centropyge heraldi Woods & L. P. Schultz, 1953	Yellow pygmy angelfish	Pacific Ocean
	Centropyge hotumatua J. E. Randall & D. K. Caldwell, 1973	Black-ear pygmy angelfish	Eastern Pacific: Austral (including Rapa), Pitcairn and Easter islands.
	Centropyge interrupta (S. Tanaka (I), 1918)	Japanese pygmy angelfish	Ogasawara Islands south of Japan.
	Centropyge joculator Smith-Vaniz & J. E. Randall, 1974	Yellow-head pygmy angelfish	Eastern Indian Ocean: Cocos and Christmas Islands.
	Centropyge loriculus (Günther, 1874)	Flame pygmy angelfish	Reefs of Oceania, most common in Marshall, Line, and Cook Islands
	Centropyge multicolor J. E. Randall & Wass, 1974	Multicolor pygmy angelfish	Pacific Ocean
	Centropyge multispinis (Playfair, 1867)	Dusky pygmy angelfish	Tropical waters of the Indo-Pacific
	Centropyge nahackyi Kosaki, 1989	Nahacky's pygmy angelfish	Eastern Central Pacific: Johnston Atoll. Strays reported from the Hawaiian Islands.
	Centropyge narcosis Pyle & J. E. Randall, 1993	Narc pygmy angelfish	Cook Islands
	Centropyge nigriocellus Woods & L. P. Schultz, 1953	Black-spot pygmy angelfish	Pacific Ocean near American Samoa; Cook Islands; Guam; Kiribati (Phoenix Is.); Marshall Islands; Federated States of Micronesia; Nauru; New Caledonia; Northern Mariana Islands; Papua New Guinea; Samoa; Tokelau; Tuvalu; United States Minor Outlying Islands (Howland-Baker Is., Johnston I., US Line Is.)
	Centropyge nox (Bleeker, 1853)	Midnight pygmy angelfish	Western Pacific: Ryukyu Islands to Indonesia, the Solomon Islands, the Great Barrier Reef and New Caledonia
	Centropyge potteri (D. S. Jordan & Metz, 1912)	Russet pygmy angelfish	Johnston Atoll and the Hawaiian Islands in the central Pacific Ocean
	Centropyge resplendens Lubbock & Sankey, 1975	Resplendent pygmy angelfish	Ascension Island
	Centropyge shepardi J. E. Randall & Yasuda, 1979	Mango pygmy angelfish	Northern Marianas Islands, Guam, and the Ogasawara Islands.
	Centropyge tibicen (G. Cuvier, 1831)	Key-hole pygmy angelfish	Indo-Pacific
	Centropyge venusta (Yasuda & Tominaga, 1969)	Purple-mask pygmy angelfish	Western Pacific
	Centropyge vrolikii (Bleeker, 1853)	Pearl-scale angelfish	Indo-West Pacific area
	Centropyge woodheadi Kuiter, 1998	Black-fin pygmy angelfish	Southwestern Pacific: from the Great Barrier Reef to the Gambier archipelago.
