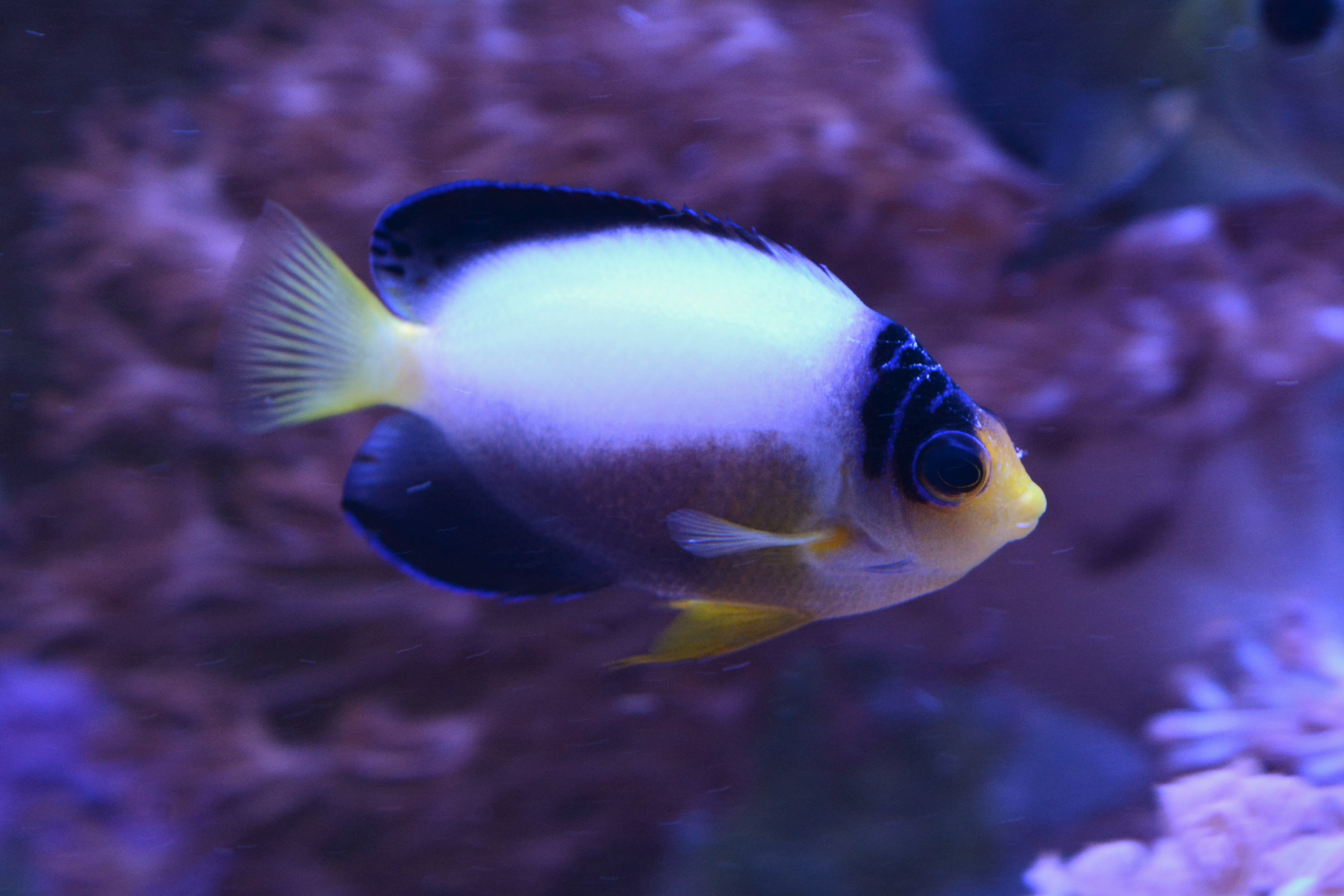

Conservation status
- Least Concern (IUCN 3.1)

Scientific classification
- Kingdom: Animalia
- Phylum: Chordata
- Class: Actinopterygii
- Order: Acanthuriformes
- Family: Pomacanthidae
- Genus: Centropyge
- Species: C. multicolor

Binomial name
- Centropyge multicolor Randall & Wass, 1974

= Centropyge multicolor =

Species of fish

Centropyge multicolor, the multicolor angelfish or pearlback angelfish, is a species of marine ray-finned fish, a marine angelfish belonging to the family Pomacanthidae. It is from the Pacific Ocean that sometimes makes its way into the aquarium trade. It grows to a size of 9 cm in length.

== Description ==
Centropyge multicolor has a body which is mainly pale-peach to orange in colour. There is a blue area behind the eyes which is dotted with black spots. The dorsal and anal fins are an intense blue and the caudal fin is vivid yellow. On the upper mid flank there is a patch of silvery-white colour which reaches to the caudal fin. The dorsal fin contains 14 spines and 16-17 soft rays while the anal fin has 3 spines and 17 soft rays. This species attains a maximum total length of 9 centimetres (3.5 in).

== Distribution ==
Centropyge multicolor has been reported from many island groups in western and central Pacific Ocean. They have been recorded from Palau; the Caroline Islands in both the Federated States of Micronesia and Palau, Guam, Republic of the Marshall Islands, the Gilbert Islands in Kiribati, Fiji, Tonga, the Cook Islands and the Society Islands in French Polynesia. They have occurred as vagrants in the Hawaiian Islands and Johnston Atoll.

== Habitat and biology ==
Centropyge multicolor is a benthopelagic species which can be found at depths between 20 and 90 metres (66 and 295 ft) in areas of the outer reef slopes where there are patches of rubble located between areas of dense coral growth. This is a shy fish which is largely a herbivorous which feeds on algae, although it probably ingests small amounts of benthic animals. It is typically encountered in harems of 3-7 fishes. This species is a protogynous hermaphrodite and has the ability to change sex from female to male. When there is no male present one of the females will change into a male.

== Systematics ==
Centropyge multicolor was first formally described in 1974 by John E. Randall (1924-2020) and Richard C Wass with the type locality given as an ocean reef off Rigili Islet, Enewetak Atoll in the Marshall Islands,. Some authorities place this species in the subgenus Centropyge.

== Utlisation ==
Centropyge multicolor is found in the aquarium trade, it has been bred in captivity and this has allowed this species to be more readily available for hobbyists.
