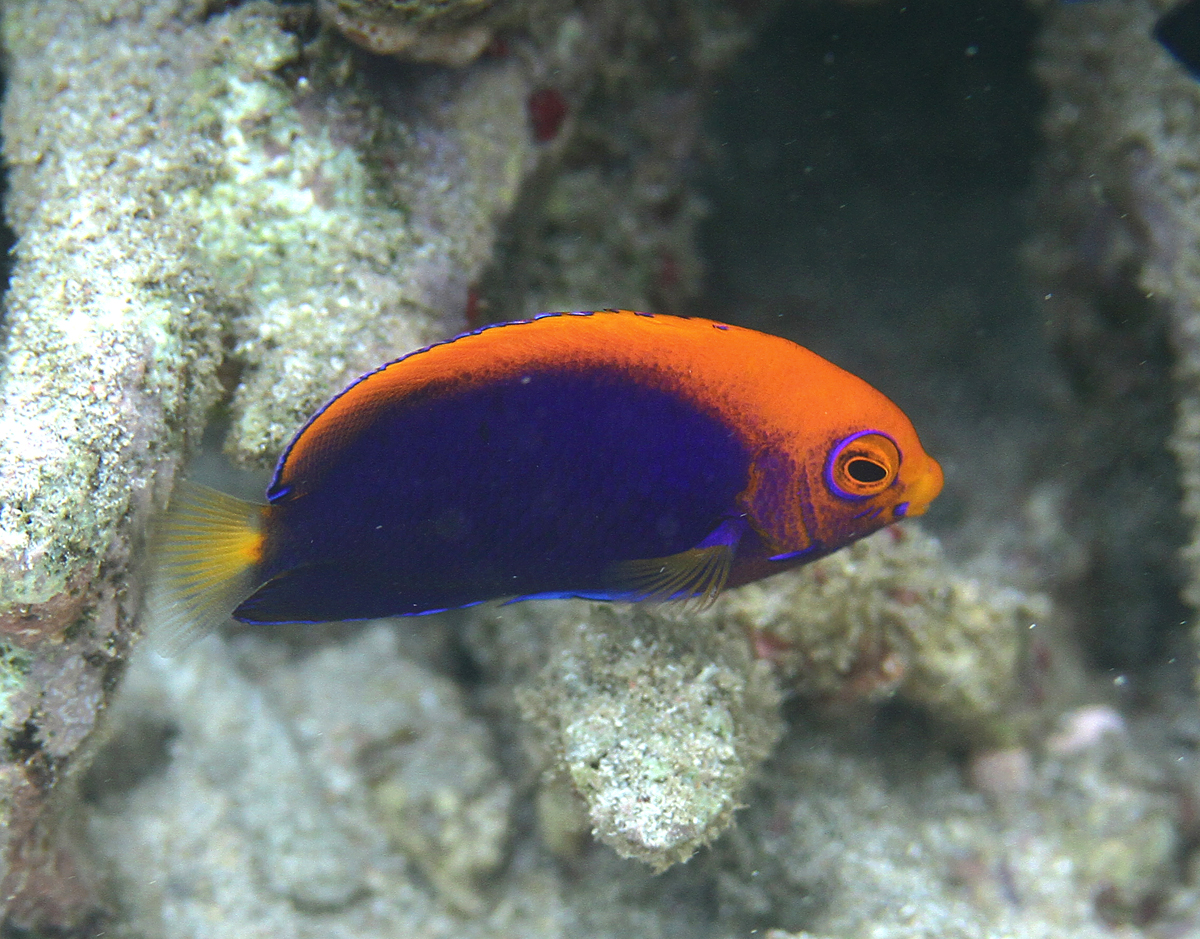
- A live individual.
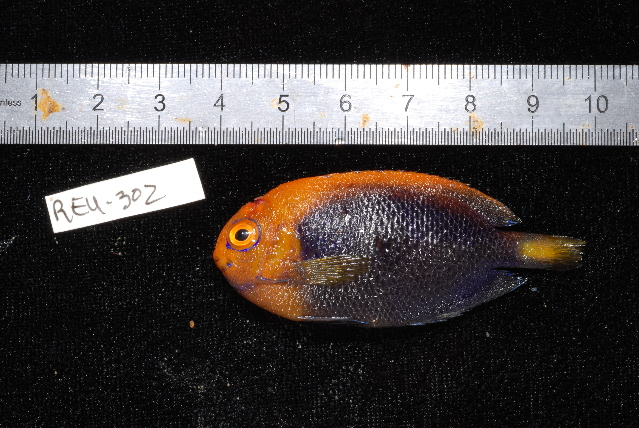
- A dead specimen.

Conservation status
- Least Concern (IUCN 3.1)

Scientific classification
- Kingdom: Animalia
- Phylum: Chordata
- Class: Actinopterygii
- Order: Acanthuriformes
- Family: Pomacanthidae
- Genus: Centropyge
- Species: C. acanthops

Binomial name
- Centropyge acanthops (Norman, 1922)

Synonyms
- Holacanthus acanthops Norman, 1922; Xiphipops acanthops (Norman, 1922)

= Orangeback angelfish =

Species of fish

The orangeback angelfish (Centropyge acanthops), also known as the flameback angelfish, African pygmy angelfish and in South Africa as the Jumping Bean or Bean, is a species of ray-finned fish, a marine angelfish belonging to the family Pomacanthidae. It is found in the western Indian Ocean.

== Description ==
The orangeback angelfish has the head, upper flanks, the dorsal fin and the caudal fin are golden yellow in colour. The lower flanks and the anal fin are black with many dense purple spots. Their eyes are ringed with blue. This species attains a maximum total length of 8 centimetres (3.1 in).

== Distribution ==
The orangeback angelfish is found in the western Indian Ocean. It occurs along the East African coast from Somalia south to East London in the Eastern Cape Province, as well as Madagascar, Seychelles, Comoros, the Chagos Islands and the Mascarene Islands. In Asia it has been recorded from the Gulf of Aden and the Arabian Sea off Yemen, including Socotra, and Oman as well as the Maldives. It has also been recorded from the Australian territory of the Cocos (Keeling) Islands.

== Habitat and biology ==
The orangeback angelfish is found at depths between 1 and 70 metres (3.3 and 229.7 ft), usually near coral and frequently in area of coral rubble where it likes to hide among the rubble. It prefers areas with dense algal growth and it grazes on algae and small invertebrates. It is a social species which is typically encountered in groups of up to 10 fishes. They are protogynous hermaphrodites in which the most dominant female in a group becomes male, this can be reversed if the dominance is lost. This species spawns at dusk, the male bites the females on the abdomen to stimulate her to lay eggs he fertilises and the eggs are then left to drift on the current.

== Systematics ==
The orangeback angelfish was first formally described as Holacanthus acanthops in 1922 by the English ichthyologist John Roxborough Norman (1898-1944) with the type locality given as Durban. In some classifications it is placed in the subgenus Xiphipops. The specific name acanthops is a compound of acanthus meaning "spine" and ops meaning "eye" and is a reference to the rearward directed spine under the eye.

== Utilisation ==
The orangeback angelfish is common and popular in the aquarium trade. It has been bred in captivity.
