= ViSta, The Visual Statistics system =

Freeware statistical system developed by F. W. Young

ViSta, the Visual Statistics system is a freeware statistical system developed by Forrest W. Young of the University of North Carolina. ViSta current version maintained by Pedro M. Valero-Mora of the University of Valencia and can be found at . Old versions of ViSta and of the documentation can be found at .

ViSta incorporates a number of special features that are of both theoretical and practical interest: The workmap keeps record of the datasets opened by the user and the subsequent statistical transformations and analysis applied to them. Spreadplots show all the relevant plots for a dataset with a given combination of types of variables. Graphics are the primary way of output in contrast with traditional statistics packages where the textual output is more important.
