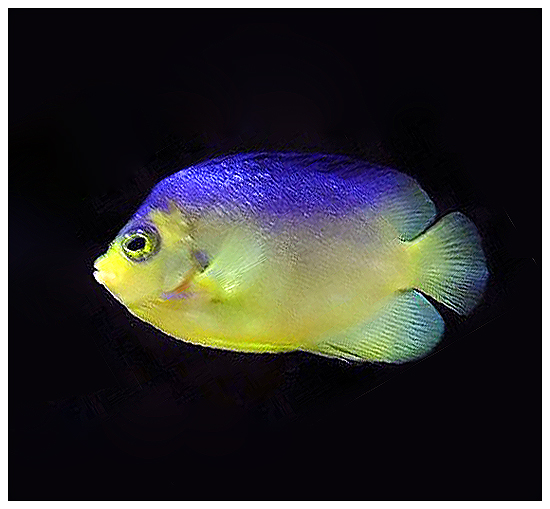

Conservation status
- Least Concern (IUCN 3.1)

Scientific classification
- Kingdom: Animalia
- Phylum: Chordata
- Class: Actinopterygii
- Order: Acanthuriformes
- Family: Pomacanthidae
- Genus: Centropyge
- Species: C. colini

Binomial name
- Centropyge colini Smith-Vaniz & Randall 1974

= Cocos-Keeling angelfish =

Species of fish

The Cocos-Keeling angelfish (Centropyge colini), or Colin's angelfish is a small species of ray-finned fish, a marine angelfish belonging to the family Pomacanthidae. It is found in the Indo-West Pacific region.

== Description ==
The Cocos-Keeling angelfish is mainly lemon-yellow in colour with a wide blue stripe from the nape along the back to the middle of the dorsal fin. There is a thin purplish ring around the eye. The dorsal fin contains 14 spines and 16-17 soft rays while the anal fin has 3 spines and 17 soft rays. This species attains a maximum total length of 9 centimetres (3.5 in).

== Distribution ==
The Cocos-Keeling angelfish has been recorded from a scattering of sites in the Indo-West Pacific. These include the Spratly Islands, Palau, Papua New Guinea, Indonesia, Marshall Islands, Cocos Keeling Islands, Fiji and Guam, with an unconfirmed report from the Ogasawara Islands off Japan.

== Habitat and biology ==
The Cocos-Keeling angelfish is found at depths between 20 and 100 metres (66 and 328 ft). It is a shy and secretive species which lives in crevices and caves in deep reef drop offs. It is found in groups which consist of a male and a harem of 2-6 females. The male is replaced by the most dominant female if he disappears. Very little is known about the diet of this species.

== Systematics ==
The Cocos-Keeling angelfish was first formally described in 1974 by William F. Smith-Vaniz and Ernest J. Randall (1924-2020) with the type locality given as Turks Reef in the Cocos-Keeling Islands. Some authorities place this species in the subgenus Centropyge.

== Etymology ==
The specific name honours the biologist Patrick L. Colin who helped collect the type.

== Utlisation ==
The Cocos-Keeling angelfish rarely appears in the aquarium trade.
