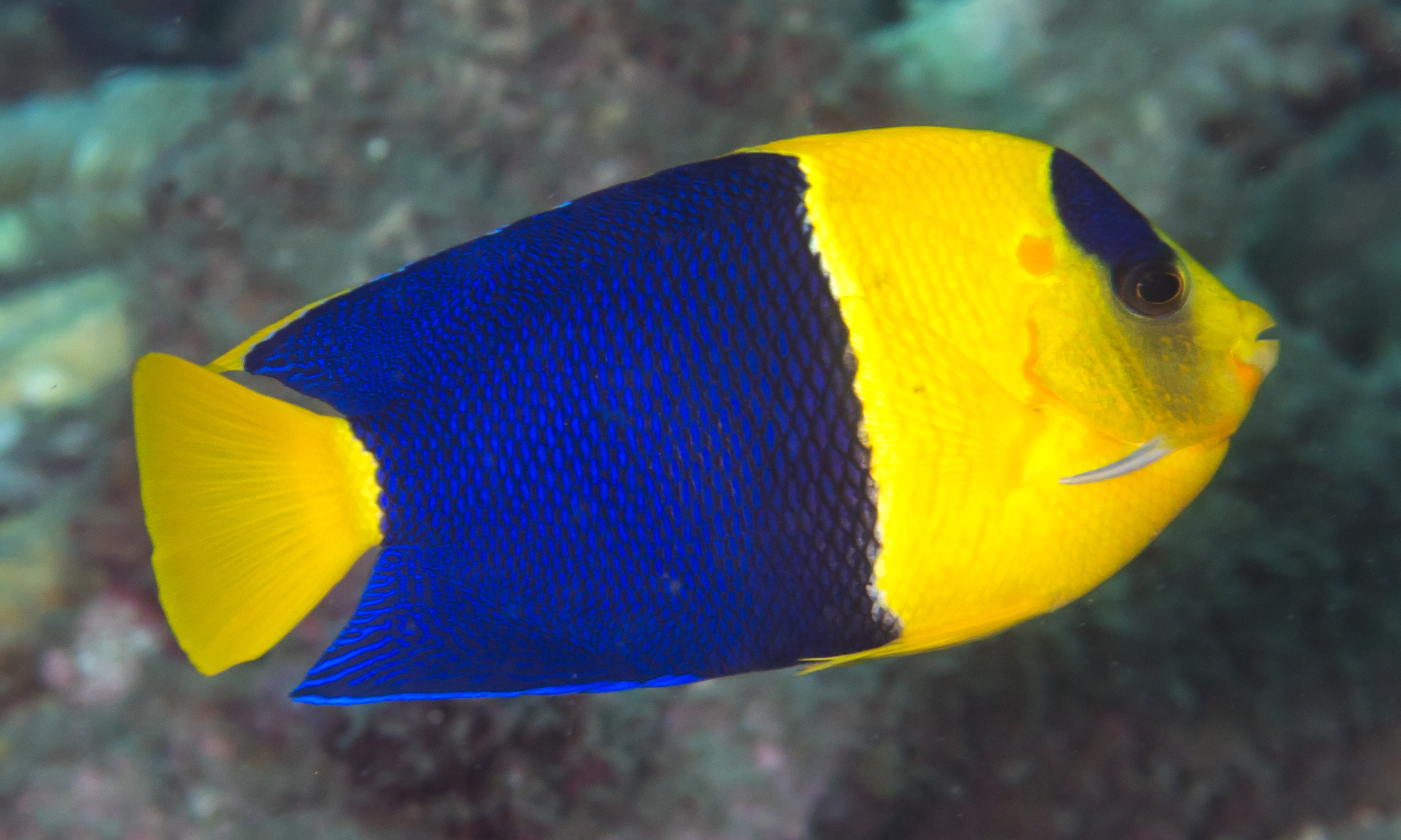

Conservation status
- Least Concern (IUCN 3.1)

Scientific classification
- Kingdom: Animalia
- Phylum: Chordata
- Class: Actinopterygii
- Division: Teleostei
- Order: Acanthuriformes
- Family: Pomacanthidae
- Genus: Centropyge
- Species: C. bicolor

Binomial name
- Centropyge bicolor (Bloch, 1787)

Synonyms
- Chaetodon bicolor Bloch, 1787

= Bicolor angelfish =

Species of fish

The bicolor angelfish (Centropyge bicolor), also known as the Pacific rock beauty, oriole angelfish, oriole dwarf angel, blue and gold angel or two-colored angel, is a species of marine ray-finned fish in the angelfish family Pomacanthidae.

== Description ==
The bicolor angelfish is a small, easily recognizable fish. The head (excluding the areas around and above the eyes), the front of the body and the pelvic and caudal fins are bright yellow, the pectoral fins are essentially transparent, and all other parts are dark blue.

== Distribution and habitat ==
Feeding apparatus

The bicolor angelfish is found in the Indo-Pacific region, including East Africa, southern Japan, Australia, the Philippines and Fiji. It lives at a depth range of 1–25 m (3.3–82.0 ft), and is associated with reef slopes, coral-rich areas, lagoons, and near drop-off areas.

== Ecology ==
=== Diet ===
The diet of a typical bicolor angelfish consists of small crustaceans (such as brine and mysis shrimp), as well as tunicates, corals, sponges, worms, algae, and sometimes clams.

=== Life cycle ===
The larval stages of the bicolor angelfish lasts for approximately 32 days. All larvae are female, as this species is a protogynous hermaphrodite, and sex change only happens in adulthood and in special circumstances (see below). The life expectancy of this species in the wild varies greatly depending on location, and ranges between 5 and 13 years.

=== Social structure ===
As adult, the bicolor angelfish lives in harems, with one male dominating the harem and several females (7 on average) ranked linearly based on size; these females exclusively mate with that one male. If the male is removed or dies, the highest ranking female in the harem will undergo sex change to replace the male. This sex change takes between 18 and 20 days in total.

=== Reproduction ===
When time is right for reproduction, the male visits the females in the harem to mate, usually at dusk. The male may visit one or multiple females per night to spawn; in contrast, each female spawns at most once per night. The female being visited will scatter her eggs, and the male will release sperm to fertilize the eggs. Higher-ranking females have been found to spawn more frequently than lower-ranked females.

=== Behavior ===
The bicolor angelfish is moderately aggressive, both to members of other species and members of their own species. The male spends most of his time guarding his territory - which tends to not exceed 200 m^{2} (2,200 sq ft) and encompasses the home ranges of all females within the harem - from predators, intruding members of other species, but mostly against other harems. Females are only aggressive towards lower-ranking members of the harem, as they hope to maintain their current rank.

In captivity, the bicolor angelfish has been observed to act as a facultative cleaner fish. It seems unlikely that it would show this behavior in the wild.

== In the aquarium ==
The Bicolor Angelfish is on the larger end of dwarf angels, and requires a large tank of at least 75 gallons with ample grazing opportunities. This fish will often nip at and consume stony corals and ornamental bivalves, though not every Bicolor Angel will exhibit this behavior. Tanks with a lot of hiding spaces are best, as this species likes to move from one hiding place to another. It can be one of the more sensitive angelfish when adjusting to a new aquarium, so it's ideal to add it early on before other aggressive fish like Tangs have established territories. The water temperature should be kept around 23–26 °C (73–79 °F), and the pH level between 8.1 and 8.4. The level of care that the bicolor angelfish requires is moderate, and it takes a range of foods, including algae, shrimps, worms, and spirulina flakes. No other bicolor angels should be in the tank unless attempting to pair them or create a harem, in which case the group should include one larger fish and one or more smaller ones to maximize your chances of getting a male.
