= Centropyge nox =

Conservation status
- Least Concern (IUCN 3.1)

Scientific classification
- Kingdom: Animalia
- Phylum: Chordata
- Class: Actinopterygii
- Order: Acanthuriformes
- Family: Pomacanthidae
- Genus: Centropyge
- Species: C. nox

Binomial name
- Centropyge nox (Bleeker, 1853)

Synonyms
- Holacanthus nox Bleeker, 1853

Species of fish

Centropyge nox, known commonly as the midnight angelfish or dusky angelfish, is a species of marine ray-finned fish, a marine angelfish belonging to the family Pomacanthidae. It is found in the Western Pacific Ocean.

== Description ==
Centropyge nox is uniformly bluish-black in colour with an irregular yellow blotch immediately to the rear of the gill cover and above the pectoral fin. The dorsal fin contains 14–15 spines and 16–17 soft rays while the anal fin has 3 spines and 16–17 soft rays. This species attains a maximum total length of 10 centimetres (3.9 in).

== Distribution ==
Centropyge nox Is found in the Western Pacific Ocean where it ranges from the Ryukyu Islands in the north to New Caledonia and the Great Barrier Reef in the south, west to Indonesia and east as far as the Caroline Islands.

== Habitat and biology ==
Centropyge nox is found at depths between 10 and 70 metres (33 and 230 ft).5th This species is common in the coral dense parts of the outer reef slopes, although it is occasionally recorded from lagoon areas and channels. The midnight angelfish shows a preference for habitats which include dense and varied growth of benthic invertebrates. It is typically encountered as solitary fishes or as pairs. This is a herbivorous species which feeds on algae. The live in harems of 3-7 fishes.

== Systematics ==
Centropyge nox was first formally described in 1853 by the Dutch ichthyologist and herpetologist Pieter Bleeker (1819-1878). With the type locality given as Ambon Island in Indonesia. The specific name, nox means "night", this refers to tilts bluish-black colour of the midnight angelfish. Some authorities place this species in the subgenus Centropyge.

== Utilisation ==
Centropyge nox occasionally appears in the aquarium trade.
