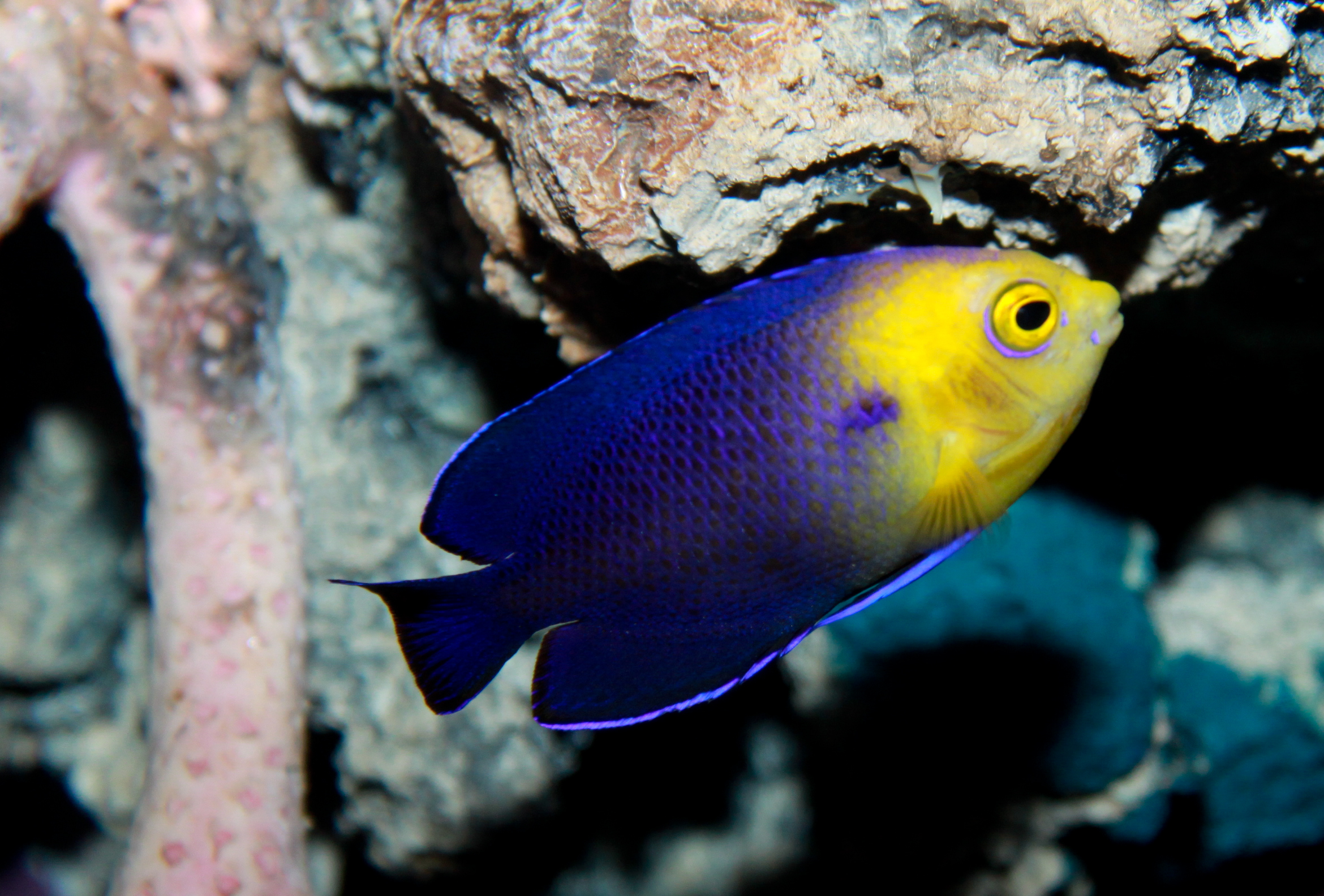

Conservation status
- Least Concern (IUCN 3.1)

Scientific classification
- Kingdom: Animalia
- Phylum: Chordata
- Class: Actinopterygii
- Order: Acanthuriformes
- Family: Pomacanthidae
- Genus: Centropyge
- Species: C. argi

Binomial name
- Centropyge argi Woods & Kanazawa, 1951

= Cherubfish =

Species of fish

The cherubfish (Centropyge argi), also known as the pygmy angelfish, is a species of marine ray-finned fish, a marine angelfish belonging to the family Pomacanthidae. It is found in the western Atlantic Ocean.

== Description ==
The cherubfish has an oval, deep and laterally compressed body with a short, blunt snout and a small mouth. There is a long, robust spine at the angle of the preoperculum, which has its vertical edge being serrated. The body is deep blue in colour with the head and chest being orange-yellow with a thin blue eye ring and a small dark blue botch to the rear of the mouth. The pectoral fins are pale yellowish while the other fins are dark blue with light blue margins. The dorsal fin contains 14–15 spines and 15–16 soft rays while the anal fin has 3 spines and 17 soft rays. This species attains a maximum total length of 8 centimetres (3.1 in).

== Distribution ==
The cherubfish is found in the western Atlantic Ocean. It occurs off Bermuda, and from North Carolina through the Caribbean Sea and Gulf of Mexico to the Caribbean coast of South America, as far east as French Guiana.

== Habitat and biology ==
The cherubfish occurs at depths between 5 and 18 metres (16 and 59 ft), typically below 30 metres (98 ft). Its usual habitat is coral rubble where it feeds on algae and small benthic invertebrates. It retreats into cavities when alarmed. It lives in small groups of around 10 fish, usually a single male and a few females and juveniles.

== Systematics ==
The cherubfish was first formally described in 1951 by Loren Paul Woods and Robert H. Kanazawa with the type locality given as the Argus Bank near Bermuda. In some classifications it is placed in the subgenus Xiphipops.The specific name refers to the type locality.

== Utilisation ==
The cherubfish is one of the most popular species of marine angelfish in aquaria.
