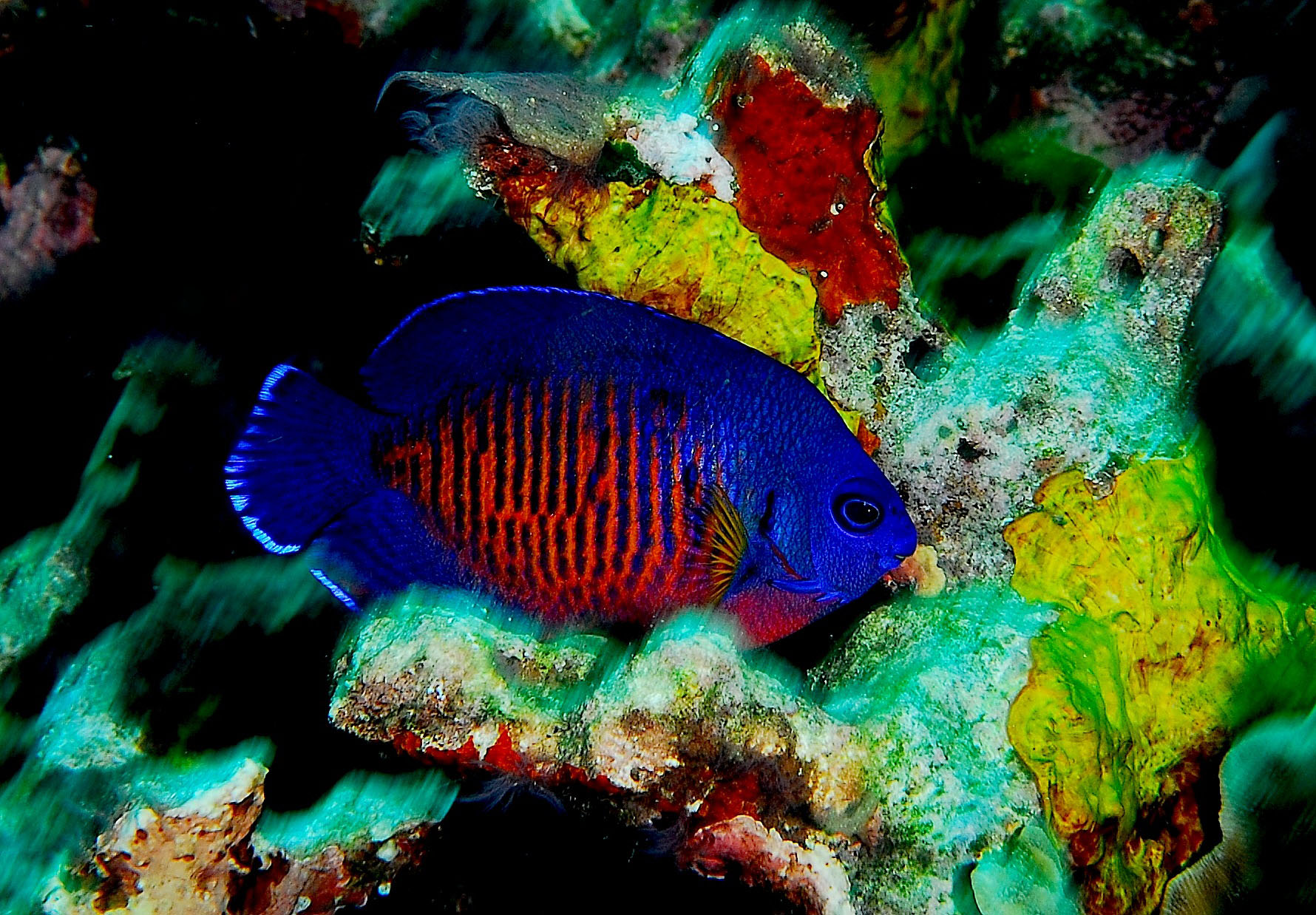

Conservation status
- Least Concern (IUCN 3.1)

Scientific classification
- Kingdom: Animalia
- Phylum: Chordata
- Class: Actinopterygii
- Order: Acanthuriformes
- Family: Pomacanthidae
- Genus: Centropyge
- Species: C. bispinosa

Binomial name
- Centropyge bispinosa (Günther, 1860)

Synonyms
- Holacanthus bispinosus Günther, 1860; Centropyge bispinosus (Günther, 1860)

= Twospined angelfish =

Species of fish

The twospined angelfish (Centropyge bispinosa), also known as the dusky angelfish, or coral beauty, is a species of marine ray-finned fish, a marine angelfish belonging to the family Pomacanthidae. They are found in the Indo-Pacific.

== Description ==
The twospined angelfish has a basic dark purplish-blue body. This is marked with irregular orange vertical bars on its flanks. The dorsal, caudal and anal fins have a bright blue margin. The dorsal fin contains 14 spines and 17–18 soft rays while the anal fin has 3 spines and 17–19 soft rays. This species attains a maximum total length of 10 centimetres (3.9 in).

== Distribution ==
The twospined angelfish is found in the Indo-Pacific. Its range extends from the coast of East Africa between Tanzania and South Africa as Far East as the Tuamotu Islands of French Polynesia, north to the Izu Islands of Japan and south to Lord Howe Island. In Australia, as well as Lord Howe Island, it is found from the Rowley Shoals and Scott Reef in Western Australia, Ashmore Reef in the Timor Sea, and along the east coast from Raine Island in Queensland to Bass Point in New South Wales as well as Christmas Island. Offshore it occurs at Norfolk Island, Elizabeth Reef and Middleton Reef in the Tasman Sea and Ashmore Reef and Kenn Reef in the Coral Sea.

== Habitat and biology ==
The twospined angelfish is found at depths of 5 to 50 metres (16 to 164 ft) in coral reefs within lagoons, rubble patches and drop offs, being commonest around drop offs. They live in small social groups consisting of a single male and a few females. They are protogynous hermaphrodites and the most dominant of the females in a group will change sex to become male if the existing male dies or disappears. This species feeds on algae and detritus.

== Systematics ==
The twospined angelfish was first formally described in 1869 by the German-born British ichthyologist and herpetologist Albert Günther (1830–1914) with the type locality given as Ambon Island, Indonesia. In some classifications it is placed in the subgenus Centropyge.

== Utilisation ==
The twospined angelfish is frequently found in the aquarium trade.
