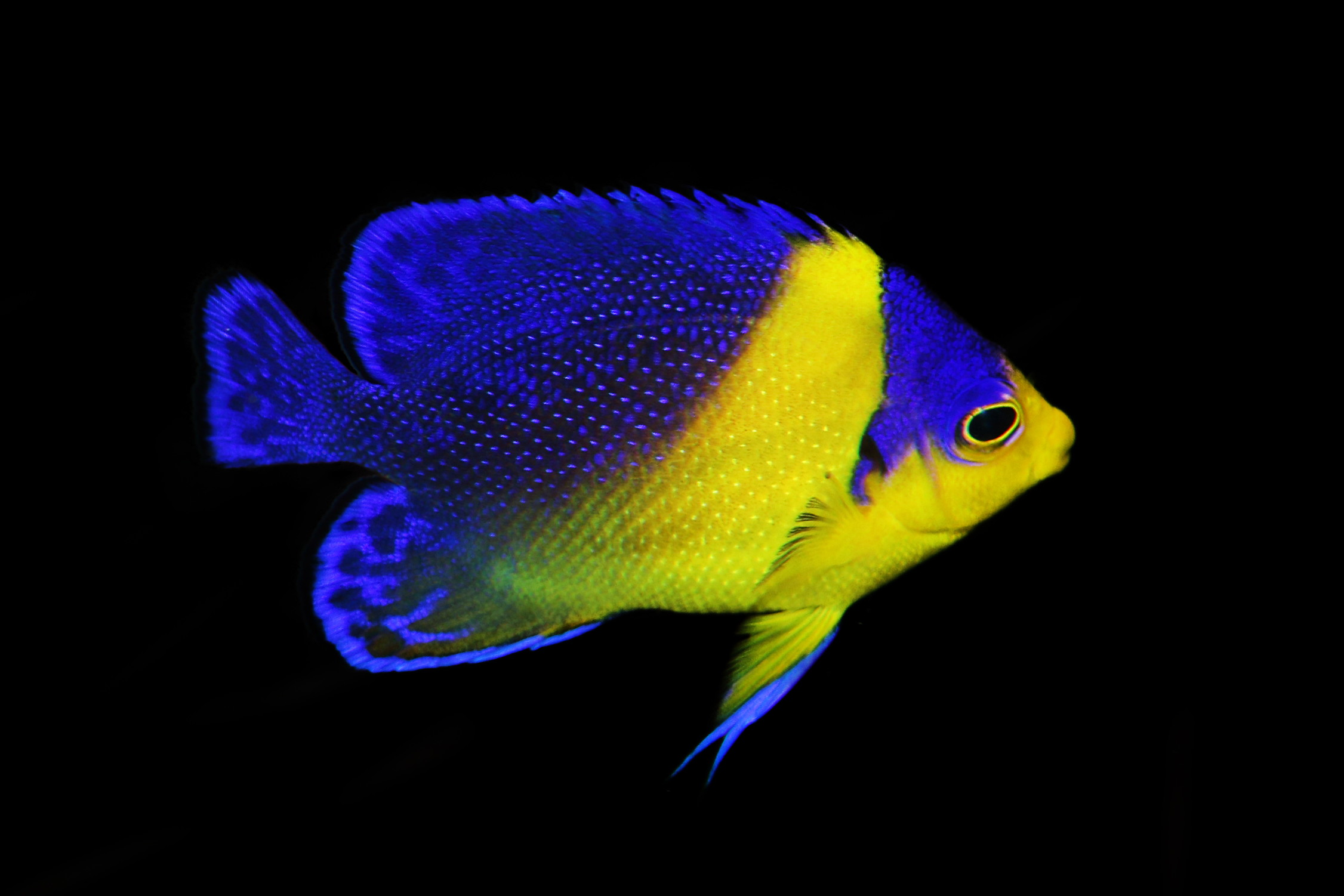

Conservation status
- Least Concern (IUCN 3.1)

Scientific classification
- Kingdom: Animalia
- Phylum: Chordata
- Class: Actinopterygii
- Order: Acanthuriformes
- Family: Pomacanthidae
- Genus: Centropyge
- Species: C. venusta

Binomial name
- Centropyge venusta (Yasuda & Tominaga, 1969)

Synonyms
- Holacanthus venustus Yasuda & Tominaga, 1969; Sumireyakko venustus (Yasuda & Tominaga, 1969); Paracentropyge venusta (Yasuda & Tominaga, 1969)

= Centropyge venusta =

Species of fish

Centropyge venusta, the purplemask angelfish is a species of marine ray-finned fish, a marine angelfish belonging to the family Pomacanthidae, It is found in the Western Pacific and is occasionally found the aquarium trade.

== Description ==
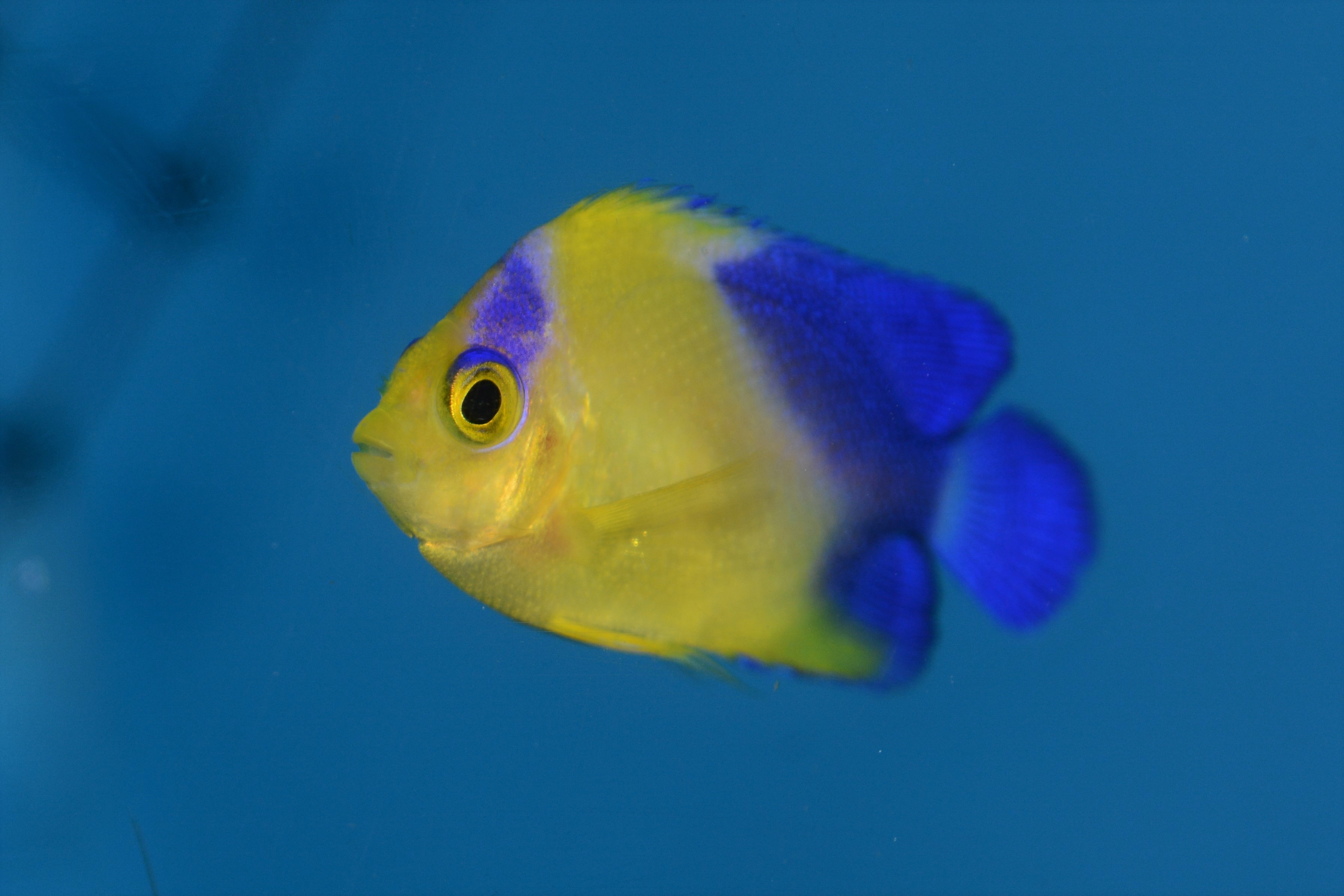
Juvenile

Centropyge venusta has a blue and yellow colouration. Yellow dominates the lower front part of the body and is also found around the snout area, There is a wedge of blue on the nape separating the patches yellow. There is also an area of blue starting close to the front of the dorsal fin and covers the rear part of the body and the caudal fin. The anal and pelvic fins are yellow with blue margins. The distribution of the blue and yellow colour varies in individual fishes. The dorsal fin contains 14 spines and 16 soft rays while the anal fin has 3 spines and 15 soft rays. This species attains a maximum total length of 12 centimetres (4.7 in).

== Distribution ==
Centropyge venusta occurs in the western Pacific Ocean. It is found around the Ryukyu Islands and Izu Islands of southern Japan, Taiwan and northern Luzon in the Philippines.

== Habitat and biology ==
Centropyge venustais found at depths between 10 and 40 metres (33 and 131 ft). It is a shy and unapproachable species of caves and overhangs, where it is typically encountered as solitary individuals oriented upside down on the roofs. It does form pairs or small groups. Its diet in the wild is unknown but in captivity it requires live food.

== Systematics ==
Centropyge venusta was first formally described as Holocanthus venustus in 1969 by the Japanese ichthyologists Fujio Yasuda and Yoshiaki Tominaga with the type locality given as Izu Ōshima in Sagami Bay. The specific name venusta means "beautiful". Some authorities place this species in the subgenus Paracentropyge, which is sometimes treated as a valid genus.

== Utilisation ==
Centropyge venusta is rare in the aquarium trade and commands high prices when it does become available. It has now been bred and successfully reared in captivity.
