= Forrest W. Young =

- Born: April 10, 1940
- Died: 2006
- Education: University of Southern California
- Scientific career
- Fields: Psychology
- Workplaces: University of North Carolina at Chapel Hill
- Thesis: A multidimensional similarities analysis of twelve choice probability learning with payoffs (1967)
- Doctoral advisor: Norman Cliff

Forrest Wesley Young (April 10, 1940 – 2006) was a professor emeritus of quantitative psychology at the University of North Carolina and President of the Psychometric Society. He is the developer of ViSta a software for data visualization.

== Books ==
- Schiffman, S.S., Reynolds, M.L. & Young, F.W. (1981). Introduction to Multidimensional Scaling. New York: Academic Press.
- Young, F.W. & Sarle, W.S. (1982). Exploratory Multivariate Data Analysis. Cary, NC: SAS Institute, Inc.
- Young, F.W. & Hamer, R.M. (1987). Multidimensional Scaling: History, Theory and Applications. New York: Erlbaum Associates. (reprinted, 1994)
