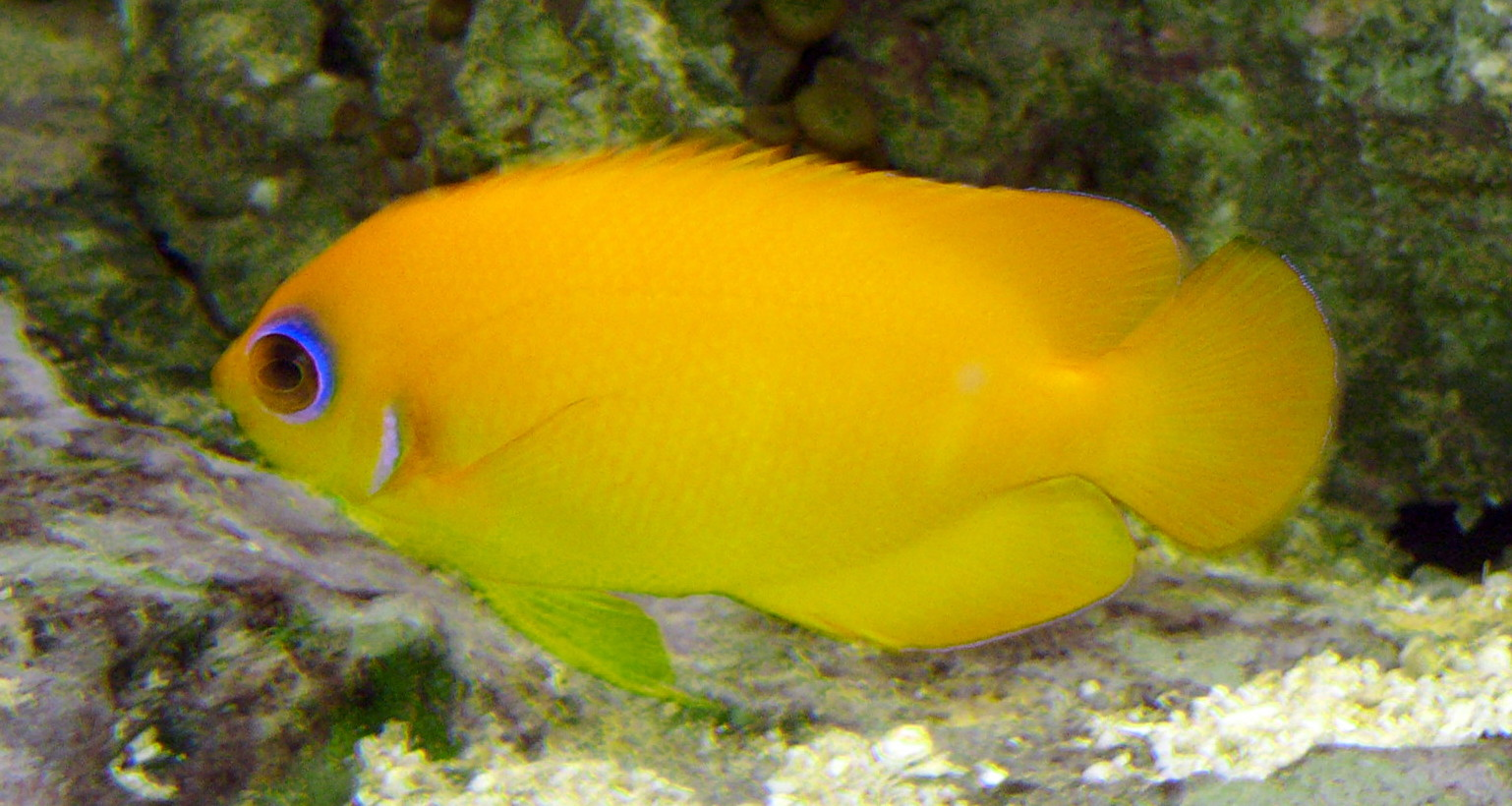

Conservation status
- Least Concern (IUCN 3.1)

Scientific classification
- Kingdom: Animalia
- Phylum: Chordata
- Class: Actinopterygii
- Division: Teleostei
- Order: Acanthuriformes
- Family: Pomacanthidae
- Genus: Centropyge
- Species: C. flavissima

Binomial name
- Centropyge flavissima (Cuvier, 1831)

Synonyms
- Holacanthus flavissimus Cuvier, 1831

= Lemonpeel angelfish =

Species of fish

The lemonpeel angelfish (Centropyge flavissima), also known as the yellow angelfish, is a species of marine ray-finned fish belonging to the family Pomacanthidae. It is found in the Indo-Pacific region.

== Description ==
The lemonpeel angelfish is bright yellow in colour with a bluish or whitish ring surrounding the eye. There is a black blotch on the rear margin of the gill cover. The spine on the preoperculum is blue, and the dorsal, anal and caudal fins have blue margins. Juveniles have an ocellus on the flank that is black with blue edges. The dorsal fin contains 14 spines and 15-16 soft rays, while the anal fin has 3 spines and 16 soft rays. This species attains a maximum total length of 14 centimetres (5.5 in).

== Distribution ==
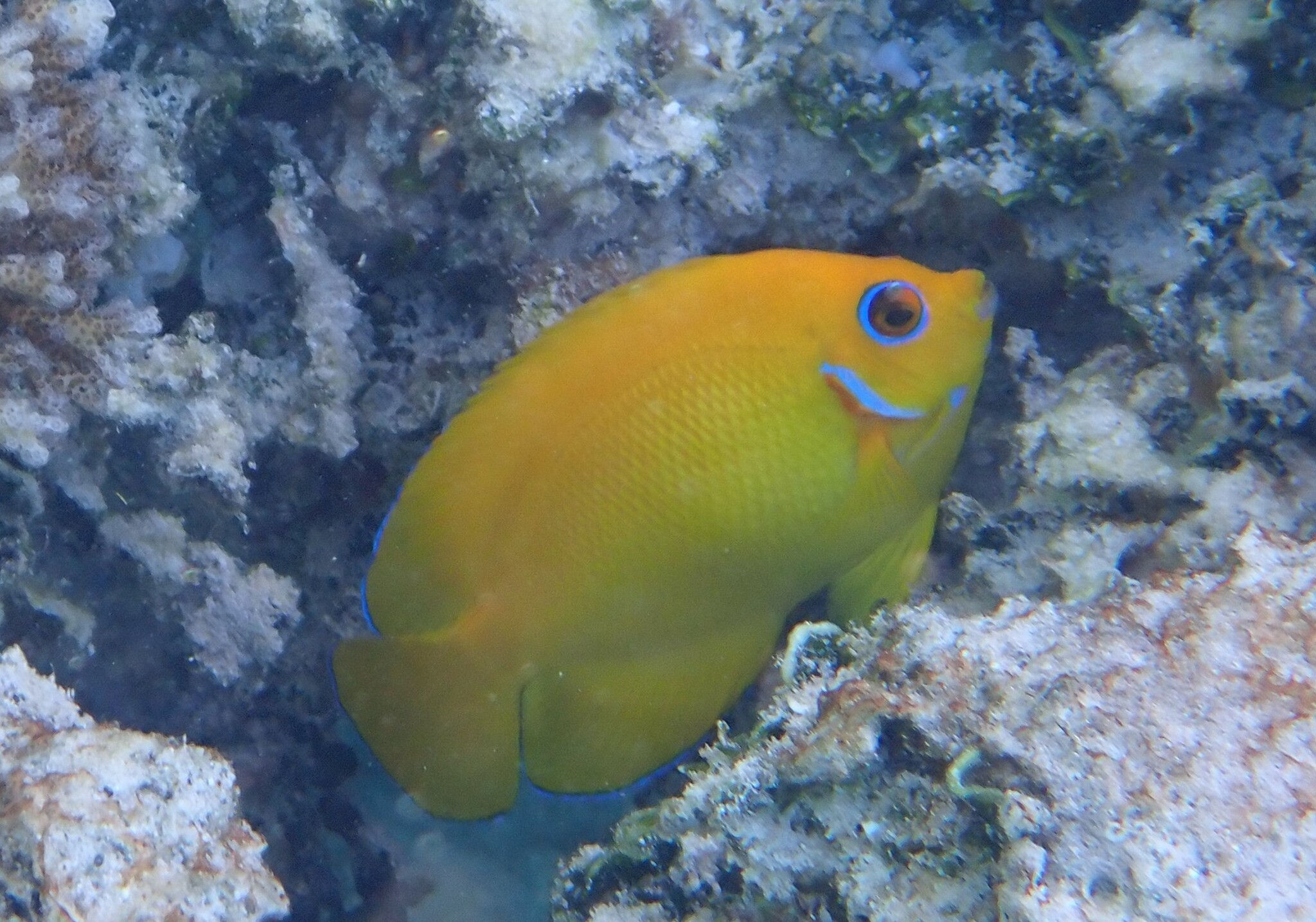
In Fiji

The lemonpeel angelfish is found in the Indo-Pacific; the core of its distribution is in the Central Pacific from the Ryukyu Islands and Ogasawara Islands of Southern Japan in the north, east to the Tuamotu Islands and south to Australia. It also occurs around some Indian Ocean islands. In Australia, it occurs from the northern Great Barrier Reef south to Moreton Bay in Queensland and the Solitary Islands in New South Wales. In addition, it is found off Lord Howe Island in the Tasman Sea and the Australian Indian Ocean territories of Christmas Island and Cocos (Keeling) Islands. Sightings in parts of the western Pacific Ocean likely represent vagrants rather than established populations. It is absent from Hawaii and Johnston Atoll.

== Habitat and biology ==
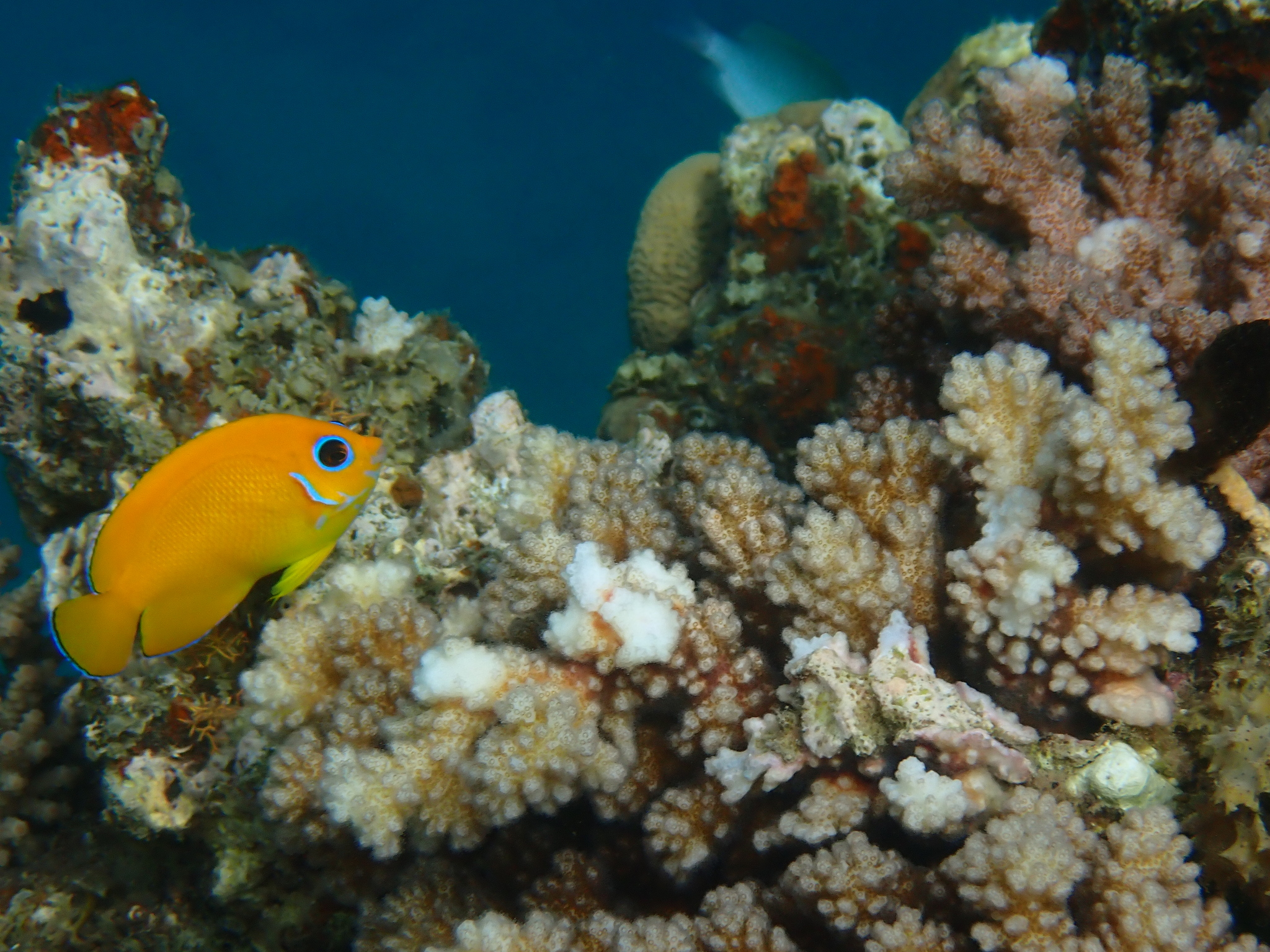
In Fiji

The lemonpeel angelfish is found in shallow water, typically shallower than 20 metres (66 ft), in coral-rich areas in lagoons and seaward reefs. Juveniles are more secretive than the adults. They are normally encountered in small groups, a harem of a single male and several females. This species is a protogynous hermaphrodite; and if there is no male in the group, the dominant female may change to a male, a change that can be reversed. It feeds mainly on filamentous algae.

== Systematics ==
The lemonpeel angelfish was first formally described as Holocanthus flavissimus in 1831 by the French anatomist Georges Cuvier (1769-1832) with the type locality given as Uléa in the Caroline Islands. The specific name flavissima means "very yellow" referring to its colour. Within the genus Centropyge, this species is considered, by some authorities, to be in the subgenus Centropyge.

== Utilisation ==
The lemonpeel angelfish is common in the aquarium trade.
