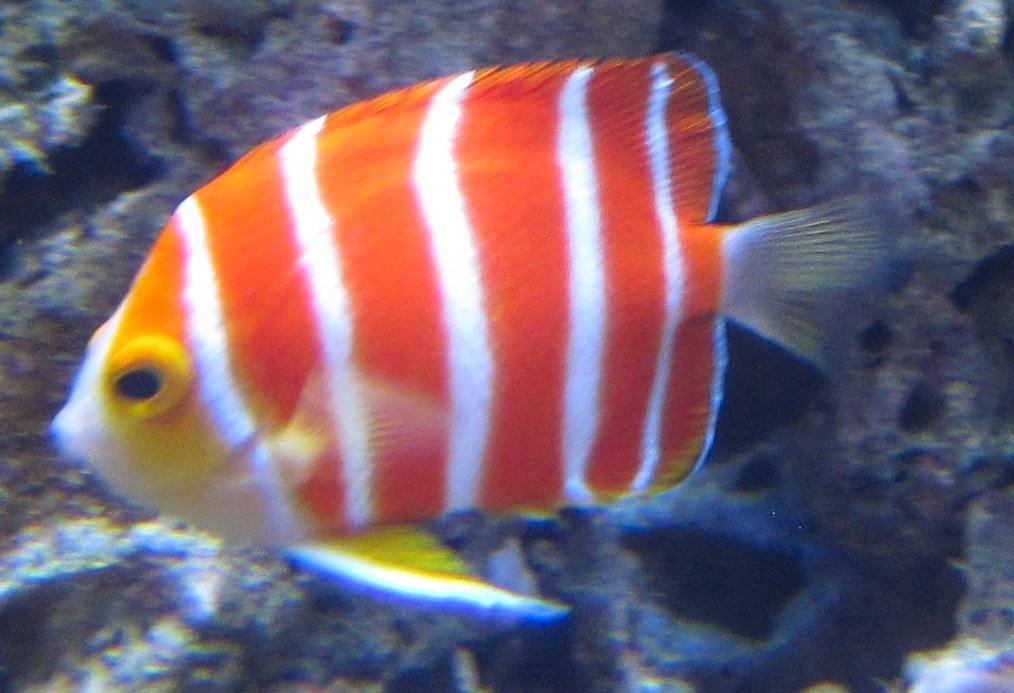

Conservation status
- Least Concern (IUCN 3.1)

Scientific classification
- Kingdom: Animalia
- Phylum: Chordata
- Class: Actinopterygii
- Order: Acanthuriformes
- Family: Pomacanthidae
- Genus: Centropyge
- Species: C. boylei

Binomial name
- Centropyge boylei Pyle & Randall, 1992

= Peppermint angelfish =

Species of fish

The peppermint angelfish (Centropyge boylei) is a relatively small species of marine ray-finned fish, a marine angelfish belonging to the family Pomacanthidae. It is found in the Central area of the South Pacific Ocean, and is known to be native to the Cook Islands. They are called Taputapu in Cook Islands Māori.

== Description ==
The peppermint angelfish has a deep, oval shaped body which has five white vertical bands on a reddish-orange background. The dorsal and anal fins have white margins and the caudal fin is translucent. The face and chin are white. This species attains a maximum total length of 7 centimetres (2.8 in).

== Distribution ==
The peppermint angelfish is found in the eastern central Pacific Ocean. It has only been recorded from Rarotonga in the Cook Islands, although it is considered likely that it will be recorded elsewhere in the region.

== Habitat and biology ==
The peppermint angelfish is found at depths of 55 to 120 metres (180 to 394 ft) on areas of coral rubble, overhangs and caves situated in the steep outer slopes of reefs. It is little known but its diet is thought to be made up of worms, crustaceans, sponges, tunicates, and detritus. It has been recorded in pairs or small groups.

== Systematics ==
The peppermint angelfish was first formally described in 1992 by John Ernest Randall (1924–2020) and Richard Pyle. It is placed in the subgenus Paracentropyge by some authorities. Its specific name honours the collector of the type, Charles "Chip" J. Boyle.

== Utilisation ==
The peppermint angelfish is occasionally exported as an aquarium specimen and can fetch high prices (a single specimen was offered to be bought for $30,000).
