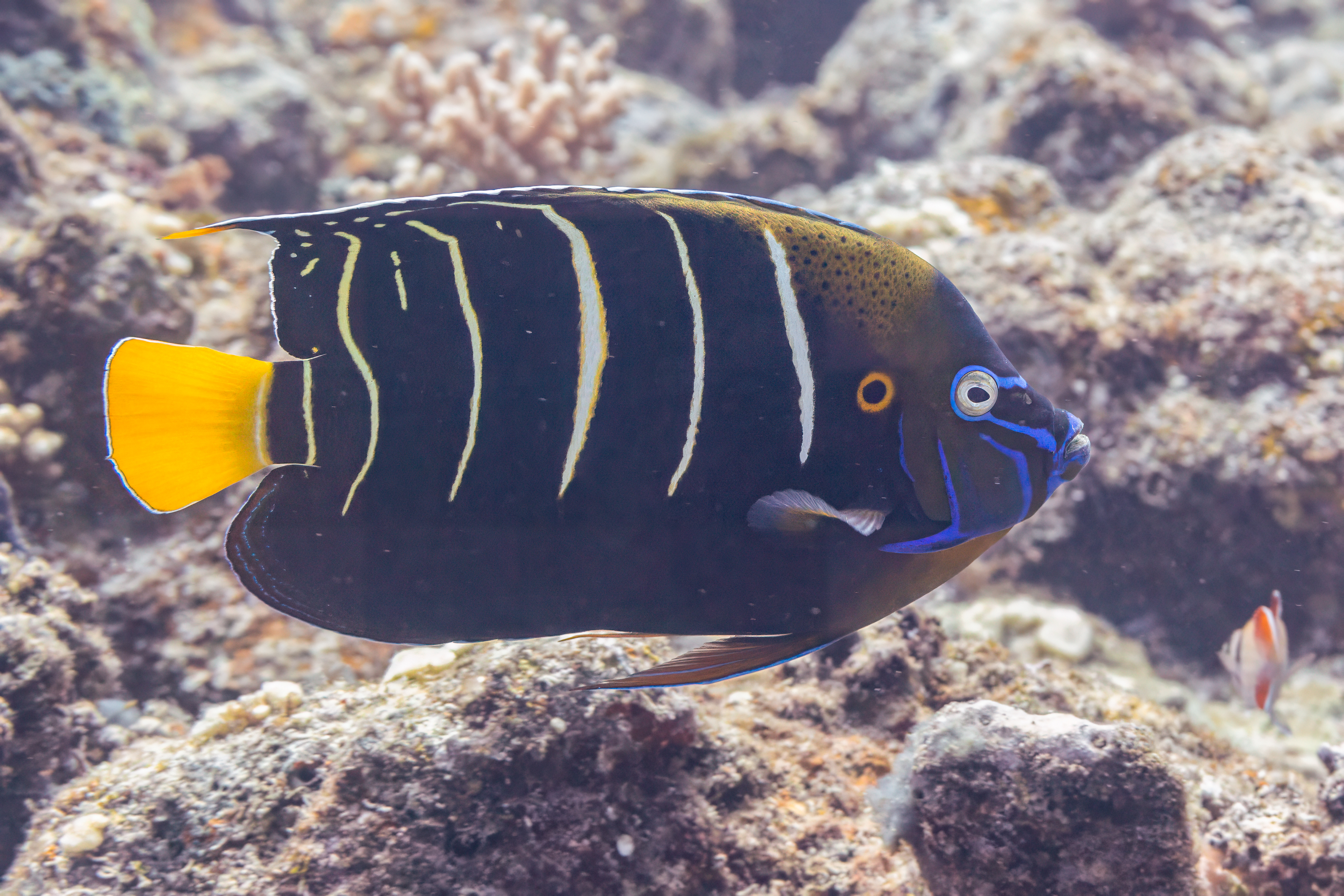

Conservation status
- Least Concern (IUCN 3.1)

Scientific classification
- Kingdom: Animalia
- Phylum: Chordata
- Class: Actinopterygii
- Order: Acanthuriformes
- Family: Pomacanthidae
- Genus: Pomacanthus
- Species: P. chrysurus

Binomial name
- Pomacanthus chrysurus (Cuvier, 1831)

Synonyms
- Holacanthus chrysurus Cuvier, 1831; Pomacanthodes chrysurus (Cuvier, 1831)

= Goldtail angelfish =

Species of fish

The goldtail angelfish (Pomacanthus chrysurus), also known as the earspot angelfish, is a species of marine ray-finned fish, a marine angelfish belonging to the family Pomacanthidae. It is found in the western Indian Ocean.

== Description ==
The goldtail angelfish shows more similarities between the adults and the juveniles than most other marine angelfishes in the genus Pomacanthus. The juveniles have blackish-brown bodies marked with many white vertical bars. The face is paler, more orangey than the body and is marked with uneven blue lines. They have a yellow caudal fin which develops a white bar on the caudal peduncle when the fish reaches around 4 cm (1.6 in) in length. Both juveniles and adults have a black spot on the upper anterior portion of the body. The adults are similar to the juveniles, the differences being that they have a dark face and no white bar on the caudal peduncle. The dorsal fin has 13–14 spines and 17–19 soft rays while the anal fin has 3 spines and 18–19 soft rays. This species attains a maximum total length of 33 cm (13 in).

== Distribution ==
The goldtail angelfish is found in the western Indian Ocean from the Gulf of Aden south along the coast of Eastern Africa as far as KwaZulu Natal. Its range includes Madagascar, the Comoro Islands and the Seychelles.

== Habitat and biology ==
The goldtail angelfish is found at depths of between 1 and 30 metres (3.3 and 98.4 ft) on shallow reefs which have rich growths of coral, or rocky reefs. The adults' diet is dominated by sponges, tunicates, crustaceans, and zooplankton while the juveniles, who are found in much shallower water consume large quantities of algae. The biology of this species is otherwise little known.

== Systematics ==
The goldtail angelfish was first formally described as Holocanthus flavissimus in 1831 by the French anatomist Georges Cuvier (1769–1832) with the type locality given as Dorey Harbor, New Guinea, which could be an error for Madagascar. Some authorities place this species in the subgenus Acanthochaetodon. The specific name chrysurus is this compound of chrysis meaning "gold" and urus meaning "tail", a reference to the yellow caudal fin.

== Utilisation ==
The goldtail angelfish is infrequently collected for the aquarium trade but does not often make it on to the market. Most commercially available specimens originate from Kenya.
