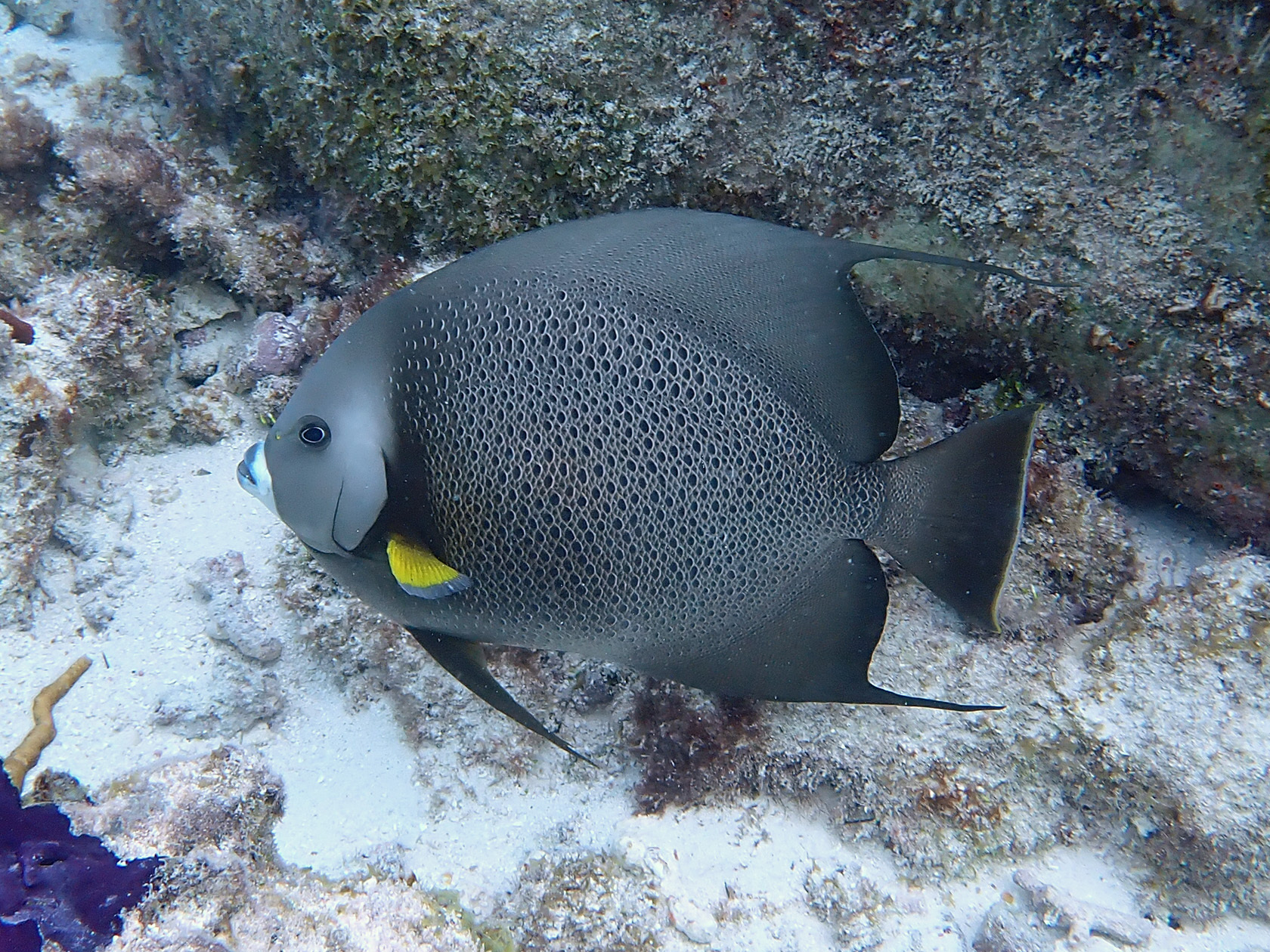
- In Florida

Conservation status
- Least Concern (IUCN 3.1)

Scientific classification
- Kingdom: Animalia
- Phylum: Chordata
- Class: Actinopterygii
- Division: Teleostei
- Order: Acanthuriformes
- Family: Pomacanthidae
- Genus: Pomacanthus
- Species: P. arcuatus

Binomial name
- Pomacanthus arcuatus (Linnaeus, 1758)

Synonyms
- List: Chaetodon arcuatus Linnaeus, 1758; Chaetodon lutescens Bonnaterre, 1788; Chaetodon quinquecinctus Cuvier, 1829; Pomacanthus balteatus Cuvier, 1831; Pomacanthus cingulatus Cuvier, 1831; Chaetodon littoricola Poey, 1868

= Gray angelfish =

Species of fish

The gray angelfish (Pomacanthus arcuatus), also written as grey angelfish and known in Jamaica as the pot cover, is a species of marine ray-finned fish belonging to the marine angelfish family, Pomacanthidae. It is found in the Western Atlantic Ocean.

== Taxonomy ==
The gray angelfish was first formally described in 1758 as Chaetodon arcuatus by Carolus Linnaeus in the 10th Edition of his Systema Naturae with the type locality given as "Indiis". When Lacépède created the genus Pomacanthus, he used Linnaeus's Chaetodon arcuatus as its type species. When Pomacanthus is subdivided into subgenera, this species is placed in the subgenus Pomacanthus. The specific name arcuatus means "bowed", referring to the curved lines on the body.

== Distribution ==
The gray angelfish is found in the Western Atlantic Ocean from New York to Rio de Janeiro, though it is typically not found north of Florida during the winter. Its range extends to all of the Caribbean Sea and the Gulf of Mexico. It has been introduced to Bermuda from the Bahamas.

== Description ==
The gray angelfish has a disk-shaped, compressed body with a large head and small snout. The snout has a mouth at its tip, which is filled with small, bristle-like teeth. The preoperculum has a sizable spine at its corner and a smooth vertical edge.

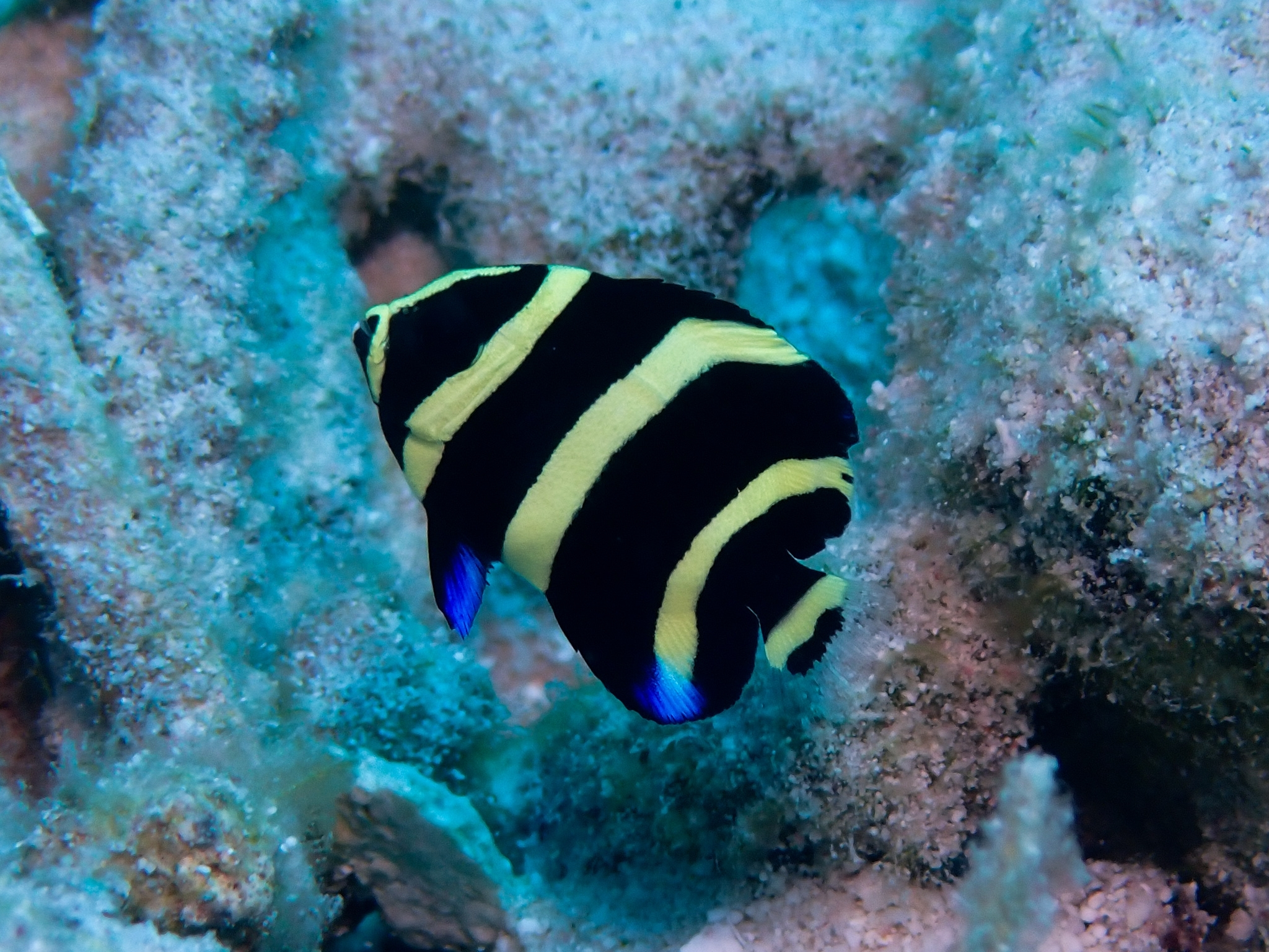
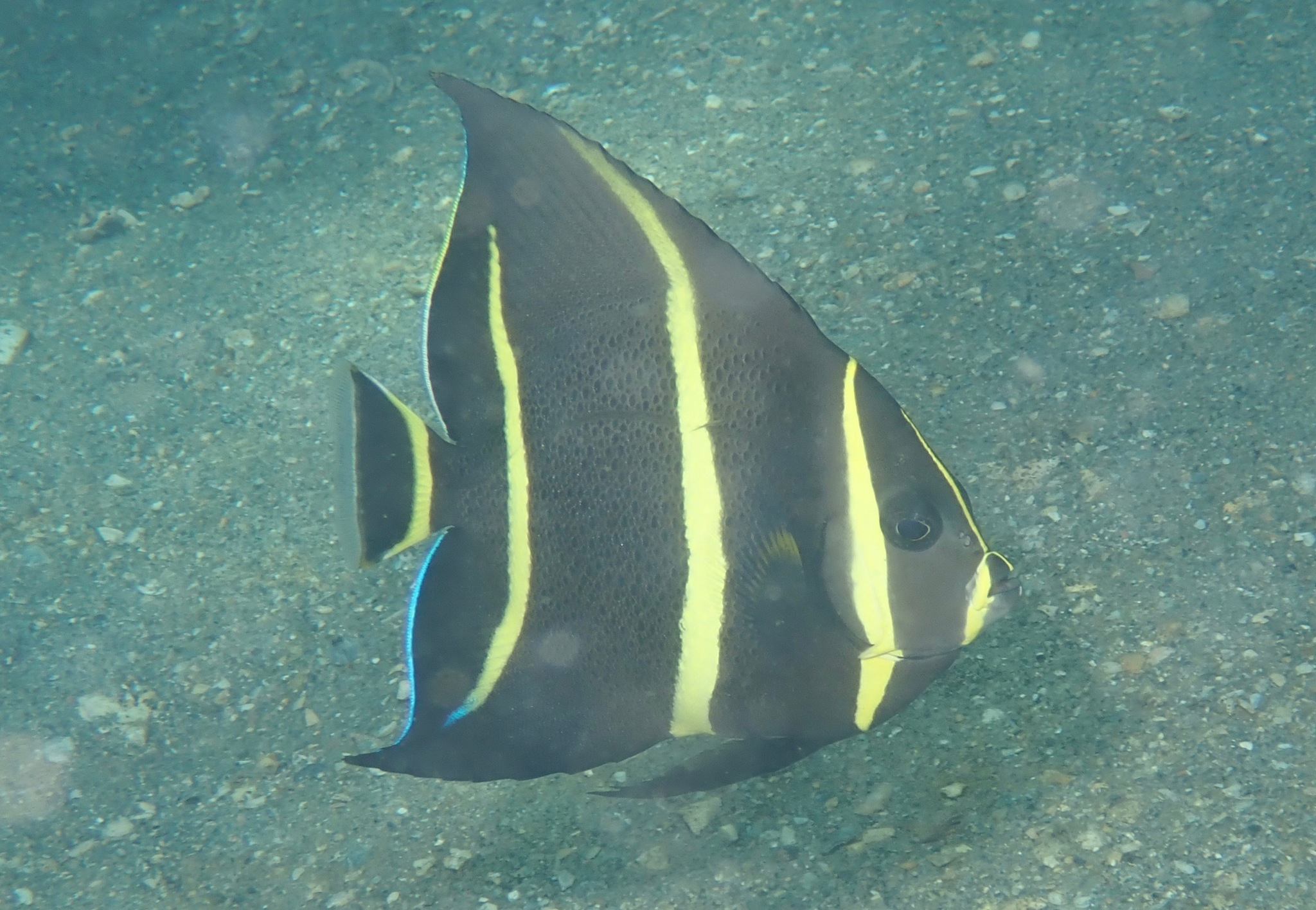
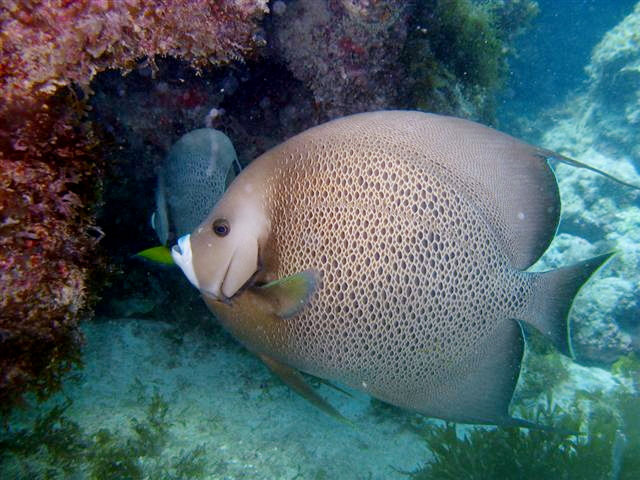
From youngest juvenile (left) to adult (right)

The juveniles have a black body marked with five vertical yellow stripes, three on the head and two on the body. The caudal fin has a black blotch which can be elongated or rectangular. Adults are pale grayish in color and covered in black spots. The head is plain pale gray with a white mouth. The dorsal and anal fins frequently show elongated streamers. The dorsal fin contains 9 spines and 31–33 soft rays, while the anal fin contains 3 spines and 23–25 soft rays. This species attains a maximum total length of 60 centimetres (24 in).

== Habitat ==
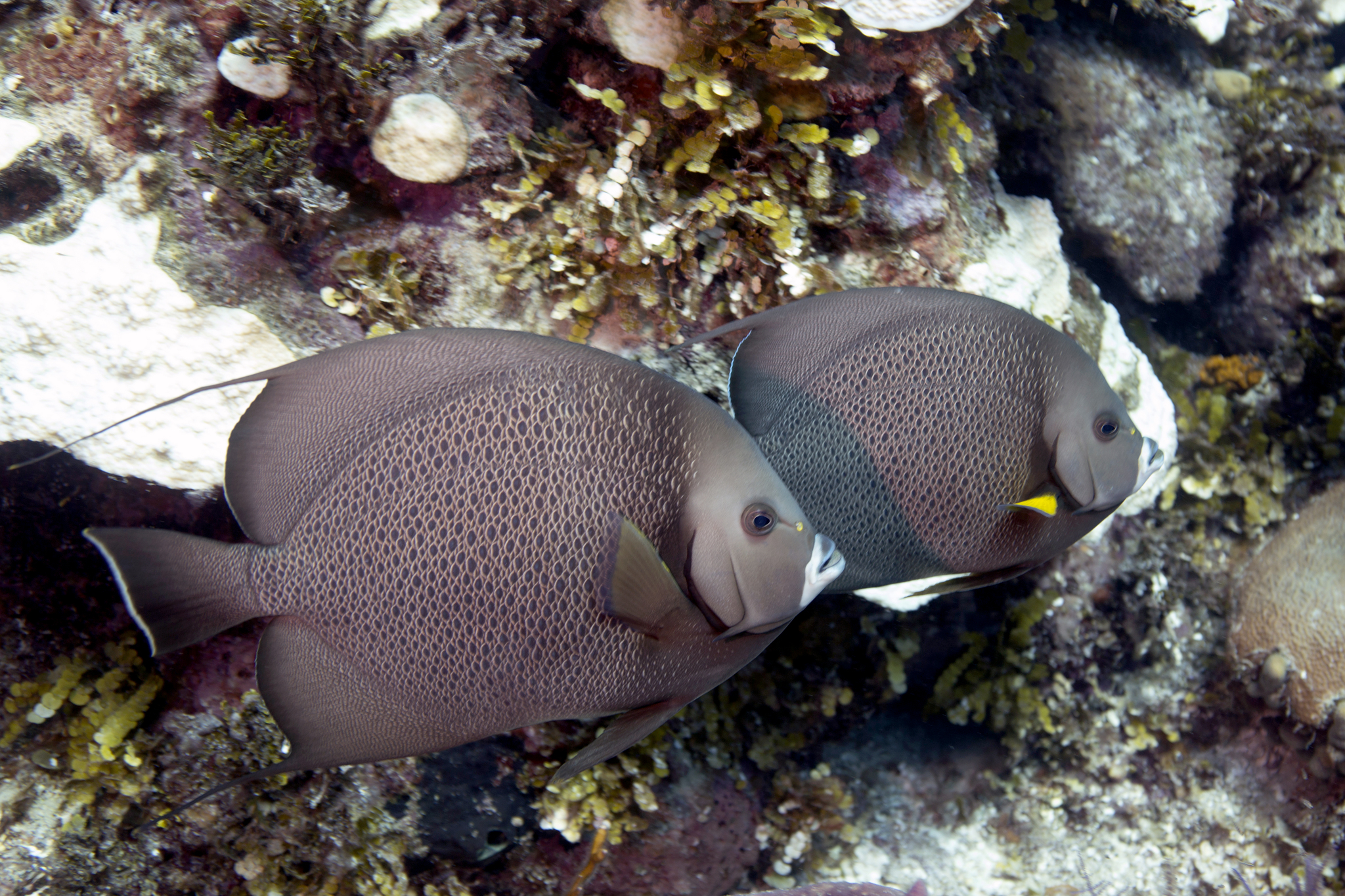
In the Bahamas

The gray angelfish is found at depths between 3 and 30 metres (9.8 and 98.4 ft) over coral and rocky reefs. Juveniles occur at shallow depths on patch reefs and in seagrass beds.

== Biology ==
=== Diet ===
The gray angelfish is a diurnal species hiding in the reef during the night. They mainly feed on sponges but have also been recorded feeding on algae, as well as tunicates, zoantharians, gorgonians, hydroids, and bryozoans. The juveniles act as cleaner fish, establishing a cleaning station which is visited by a variety of larger fishes for the juvenile gray angelfish to remove and consume their ectoparasites.

=== Reproduction ===
In the northern parts of its range, the spawning season occurs in the summer, from April to September. They have been recorded spawning above deep reefs during the early morning. The fish swim a meter or two above the reef and indulge in brief chases. The pair will chase off intruders. When they are ready, the pair swims upwards, bringing their bellies together to release eggs and milt. Females can release between 25,000 and 75,000 eggs. The fish may repeat this process multiple times. The eggs are pelagic and hatch into larvae after 15–20 hours. The larvae live among the plankton until they attain a length of around 15 mm (0.59 in), after which they descend onto the reef where they settle.

=== Parasites ===
The gray angelfish has been recorded as a host for the following endoprasitic trematodes Antorchis urna, Cleptodiscus reticulatus, Hamacreadium mutabile, Hapladena megatyphlon, Hexangitrema pomacanthi, Hexangitrema pricei, Phyllodistomum pomacanthi, Pleurogonius candidulus, Pleurogonius mcintoshi, Pyelosomum erubescens and Theletrum fustiforme. Known ectoparasites include the copepods Caligus atromaculatus, Caligus longipedis, Caligus xystercus, Pseudanuretes parvulus and Thysanote pomacanthi.

== Utilisation ==
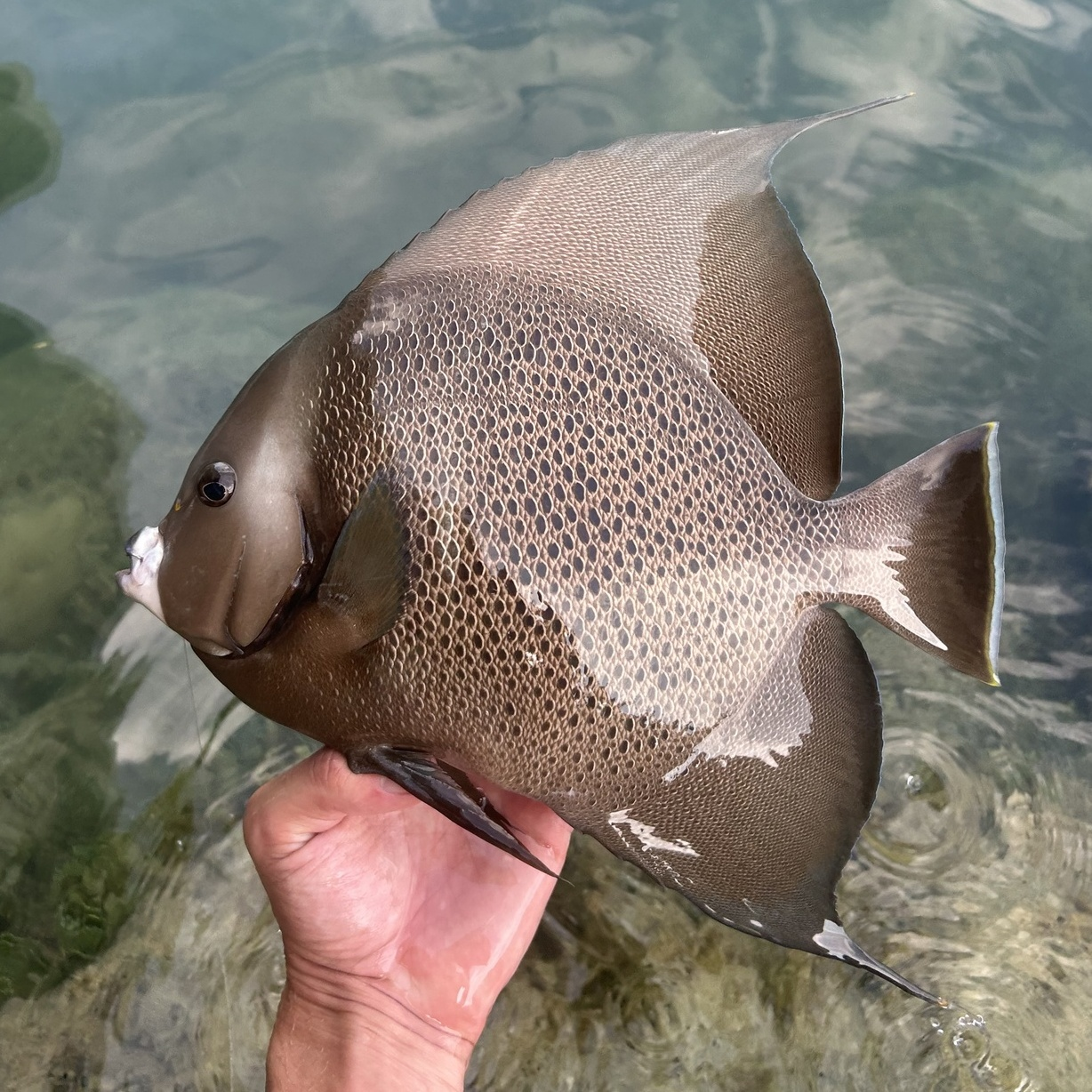
Line caught, in Florida

The gray angelfish is a popular fish in the aquarium trade. Specimens enter the trade from Florida throughout the year. Between 1995 and 2000 over 12,000 fish of this species entered the trade, which originated in Brazil. The species has been bred in captivity. It is also caught in some areas for food.

=== Toxicity ===
The consumption of gray angelfish is known to occasionally cause ciguatera poisoning. However, the risk of ciguatera poisoning from consuming this species is nonetheless considered low.
