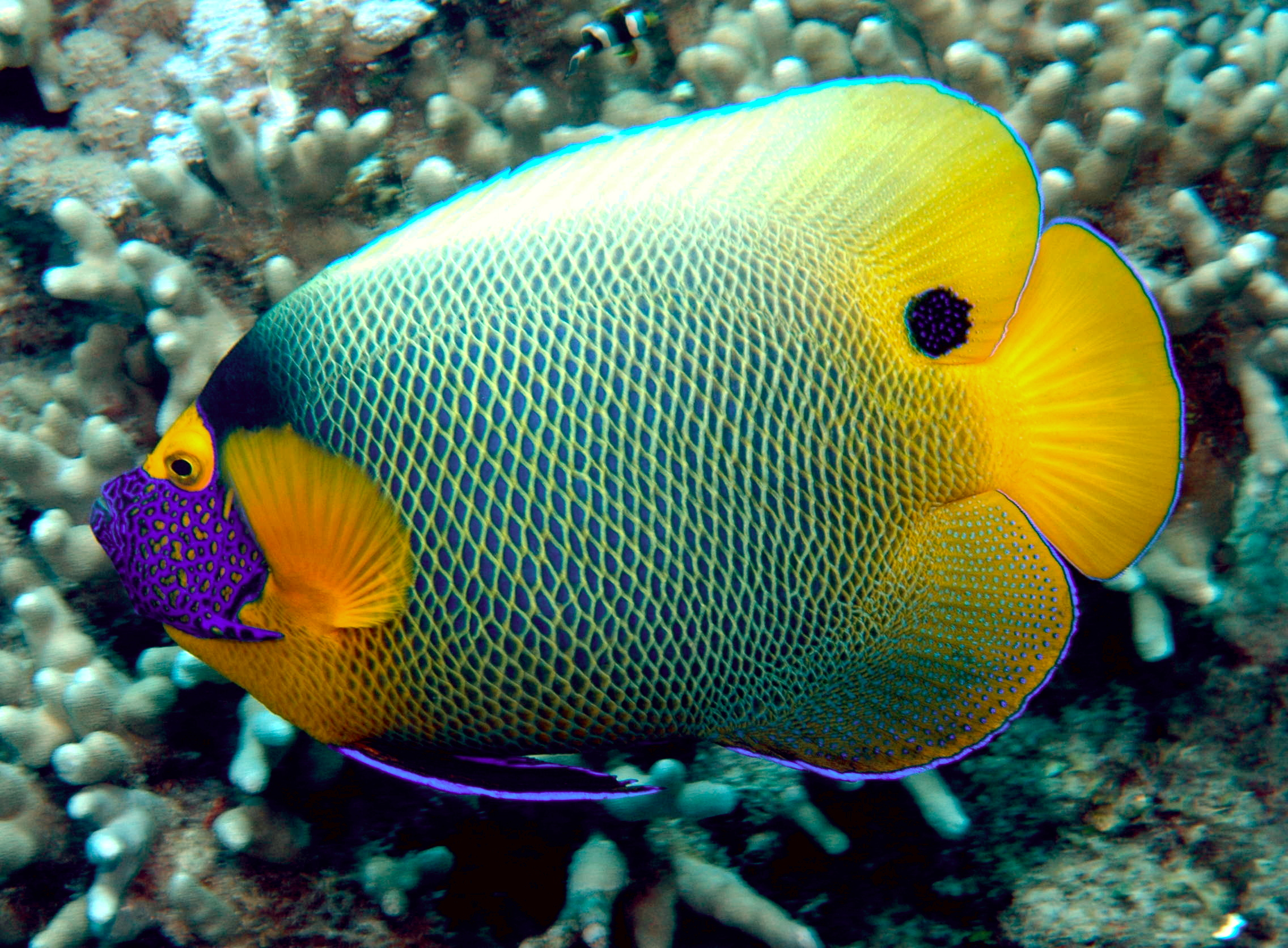
- At Great Barrier Reef, Cairns, Australia

Conservation status
- Least Concern (IUCN 3.1)

Scientific classification
- Kingdom: Animalia
- Phylum: Chordata
- Class: Actinopterygii
- Division: Teleostei
- Order: Acanthuriformes
- Family: Pomacanthidae
- Genus: Pomacanthus
- Species: P. xanthometopon

Binomial name
- Pomacanthus xanthometopon (Bleeker, 1853)

Synonyms
- Euxiphipops xanthometopon (Bleeker, 1853); Holacanthus xanthometopon Bleeker, 1853

= Pomacanthus xanthometopon =

Species of fish

Pomacanthus xanthometopon is a marine ray-finned fish, a marine angelfish belonging to the family Pomacanthidae found in shallow parts of the Indo-Pacific. It is commonly known as the blueface angelfish or the yellowface angelfish because of its striking facial colouration.

== Taxonomy ==
Pomacanthus xanthometopon was first formally described in 1853 as Holocanthus xanthometopon by the Dutch ichthyologist and herpetologist Pieter Bleeker (1819–1878) with the type locality given as Telok betong, Sumatra in Indonesia. The species is placed by some authorities in the subgenus Euxiphipops,. The specific name of this species, xantometopon means "yellow forehead", a reference to the yellow "mask" across its eyes.

== Distribution and habitat ==
Pomacanthus xanthometopon is found on coral reefs in the eastern part of the tropical Indo-Pacific. Its range includes the Maldive Islands, Malaysia, Indonesia, Japan, Taiwan, the Philippines, northern Australia and Micronesia. It has occasionally been observed off the coast of Florida. It favours lagoons, outer reef slopes and channels at depths down to about 25 metres (82 ft) and is often found among rocks and near caves. The juveniles frequently live inside caves.

== Description ==
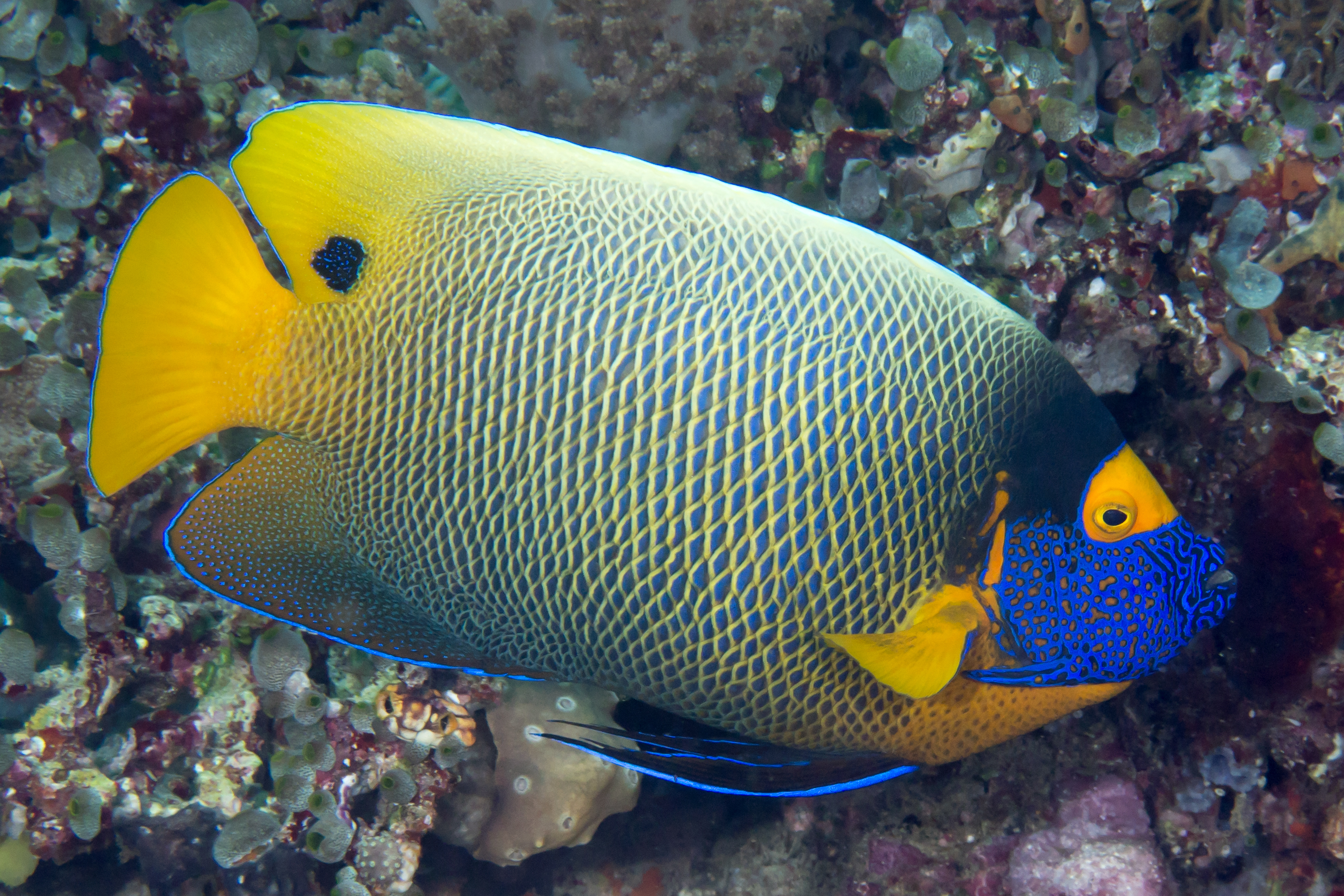
Adult

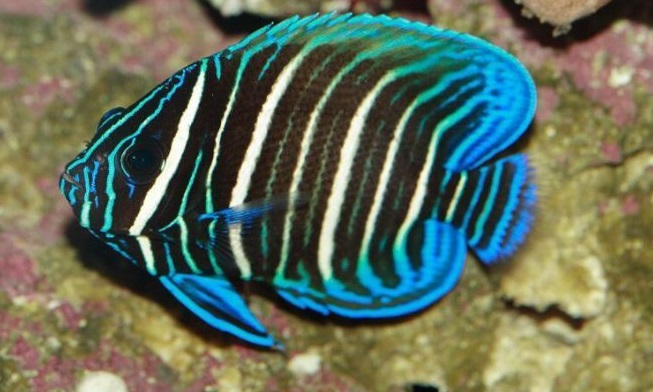
Juvenile

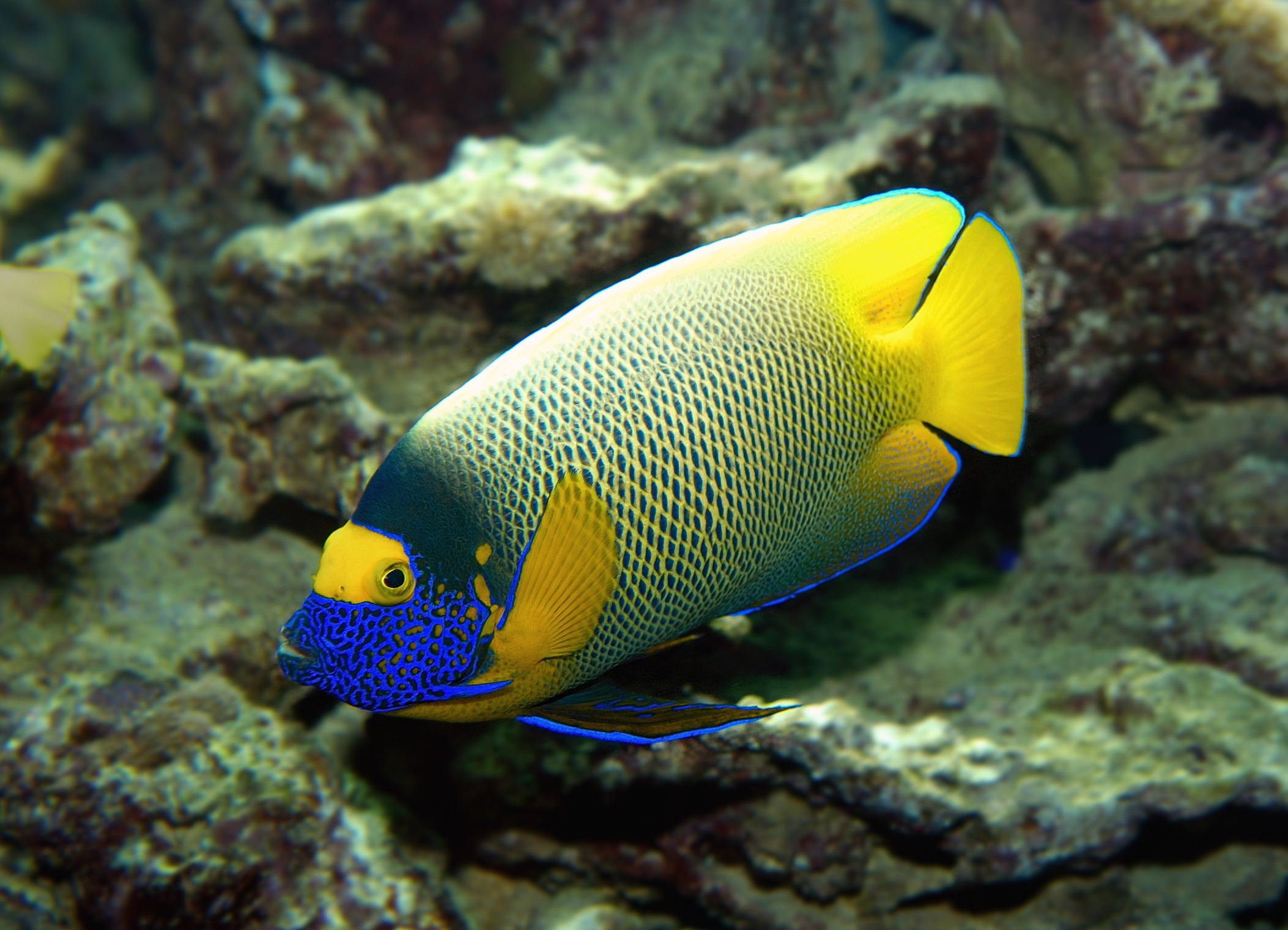
Young adult without eyespot

Pomacanthus xanthometopon grows to a maximum length of 38 centimetres (15 in) and is laterally compressed. The mouth is just above the tip of the snout. The fins are large and rounded and are yellow, some edged with blue round the margins. The dorsal fin is set just in front of the caudal region, has a distinctive black eyespot at the base and has 13–14 spines and 16–18 soft rays. The anal fin has 3 spines and 16–18 soft rays. The scales are pale blue edged with yellow giving a reticulated pattern. The face is yellow with a dense network of brilliant blue lines on the bottom half and a plain yellow mask around the eyes. Juveniles are quite differently coloured with 6 vertical white bars separated by pale blue lines and a caudal fin barred in 2 shades of blue. The juveniles change colour gradually after reaching a length of 7 to 12 centimetres (2.8 to 4.7 in). This species can be confused with the queen angelfish (Holacanthus ciliaris) or the blue angelfish (Holacanthus bermudensis), but both these have a completely blue face and lack the caudal eyespot.

== Biology ==
Pomacanthus xanthometopon usually lives singly or in pairs and feeds on tunicates, sponges, other encrusting organisms and algae. It is an egg-laying species and scatters its eggs on the seabed.

The IUCN Red List of Threatened Species considers the yellowface angelfish of least concern because it is common over most of its wide range and has no major threats.

== Utilisation ==
Pomacanthus xanthometopon is uncommon in the aquarium trade, those specimens which make their way into that trade are usually traded through dealers in the Philippines and Singapore.
