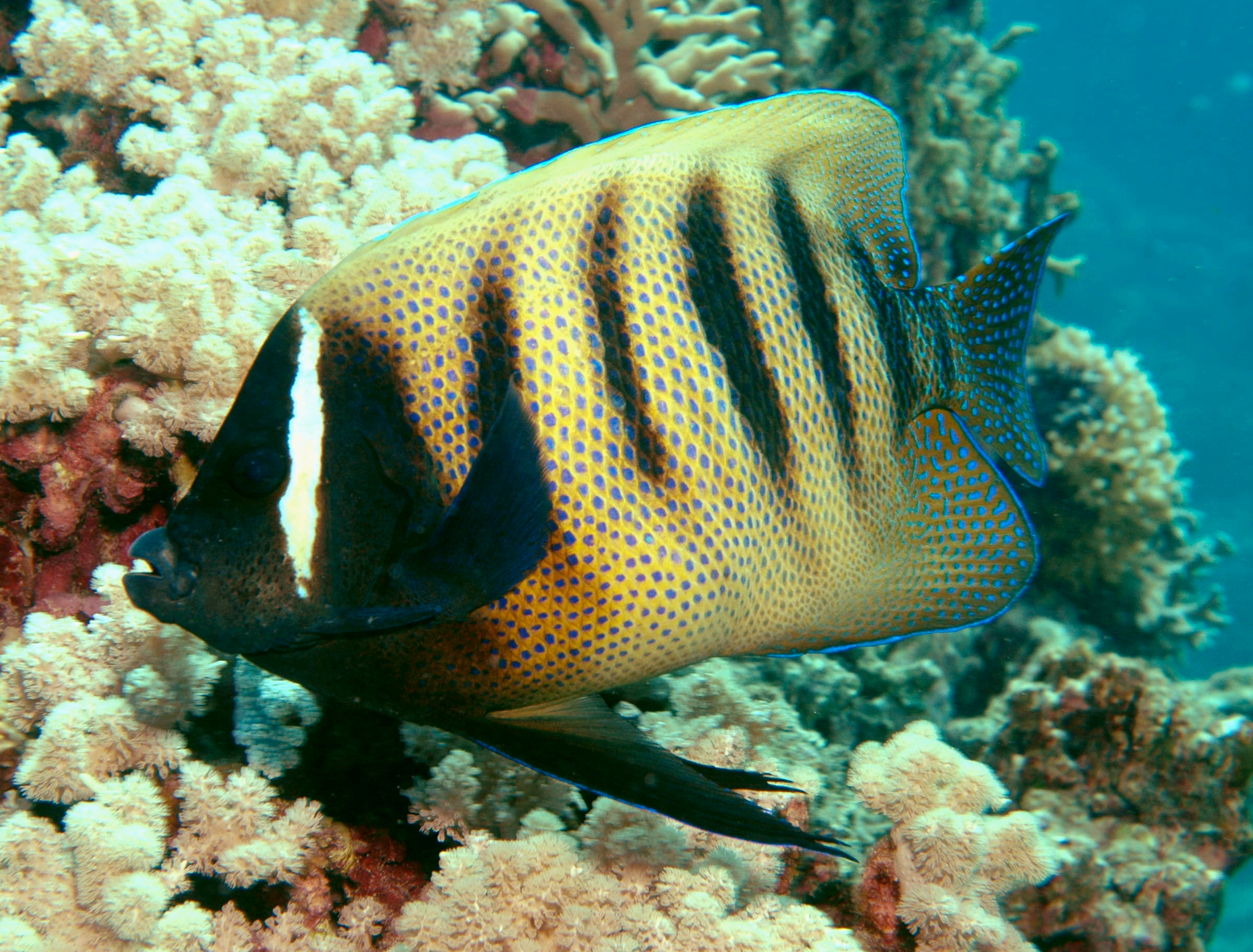
- Adult

Conservation status
- Least Concern (IUCN 3.1)

Scientific classification
- Kingdom: Animalia
- Phylum: Chordata
- Class: Actinopterygii
- Order: Acanthuriformes
- Family: Pomacanthidae
- Genus: Pomacanthus
- Species: P. sexstriatus

Binomial name
- Pomacanthus sexstriatus (Cuvier, 1831)

Synonyms
- Arusetta sexstriata (Cuvier, 1831); Chaetodon resimus Gronow, 1854; Euxiphipops sexstriatus (Cuvier, 1831); Holacanthus sexstriatus Cuvier, 1831; Heteropyge sexstriatus (Cuvier, 1831)

= Sixbar angelfish =

Species of fish

The sixbar angelfish (Pomacanthus sexstriatus), also known as the six-banded angelfish, is a species of marine ray-finned fish in the angelfish family Pomacanthidae. It is found in Indo-Pacific region.

== Etymology ==
The specific name sexstriatus means "six-banded". Like the common names, this is a reference to the six vertical bands on the flanks of the adults of this species.

== Taxonomy ==
The sixbar angelfish was first formally described as Holacanthus sexstriatus in 1831 by the French anatomist Georges Cuvier (1769–1832) with the type locality given as Java. Some authorities place this species in the subgenus Euxiphipops; this was once an independent genus (erected in 1934 by the British ichthyologist Alec Fraser-Brunner), but was later synonymized with Pomacanthus.

== Description ==
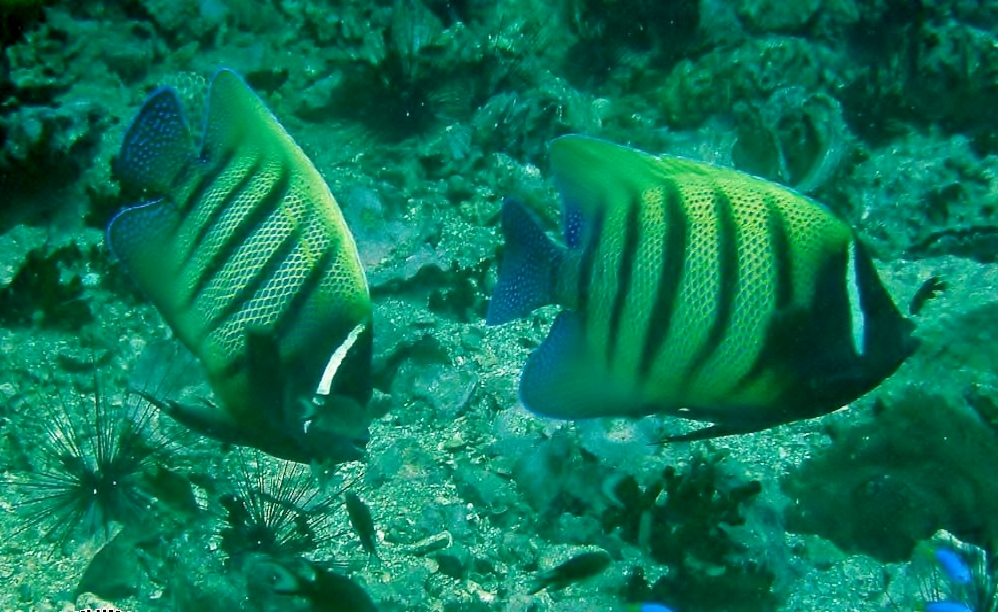
Pair of Pomacanthus sexstriatus

Video clip

=== Coloration ===
Like other species in the genus, juvenile and adult sixbar angelfish are quite different in appearance. juveniles have an overall blue-black color broken by many vertical white bands, the anterior bands being rather straight while the posterior bands become increasingly arced as they approach the tail. The adults, in contrast, have an overall color of brownish-yellow on the body and the median fins, with vivid blue spots. Along the flanks there are 6 vertical bands, the first being whitish and placed immediately behind the head and the rest being black.

=== Meristics and size ===
The sixbar angelfish has 13-14 spines and 18-23 soft rays in the dorsal fin, and 3 spines and 18-19 soft rays in the anal fin. It may reach up to about 46 cm (18 in) in the wild.

== Distribution ==
The sixbar angelfish is found from Sri Lanka through the Malay Archipelago to the Solomon Islands longitudinally, and from the Ryukyu Islands and Palau and to New Caledonia and Australia latitudinally. In Australia, its range extends from Shark Bay in Western Australia along the northern coast to the Capricorn and Bunker Group off Queensland. It is also found around the Rowley Shoals and Scott Reef of Western Australia, and Ashmore Reef in the Timor Sea.

== Habitat and biology ==
The sixbar angelfish is found at depths between 1–60 m (3.3–196.9 ft). Adults are found in lagoons and outer reef slopes, especially places where there is a rich growth of corals, while juveniles prefer sheltered inner reefs. Adults either live in pairs or solitarily, and is omnivorous, feeding on macroalgae, sponges and tunicates. When alarmed, the species can make loud, grunting sounds.

== Human interactions ==
The sixbar angelfish is occasionally collected for the aquarium trade. Only the juveniles are suitable for home aquaria, as the adults are too large.
