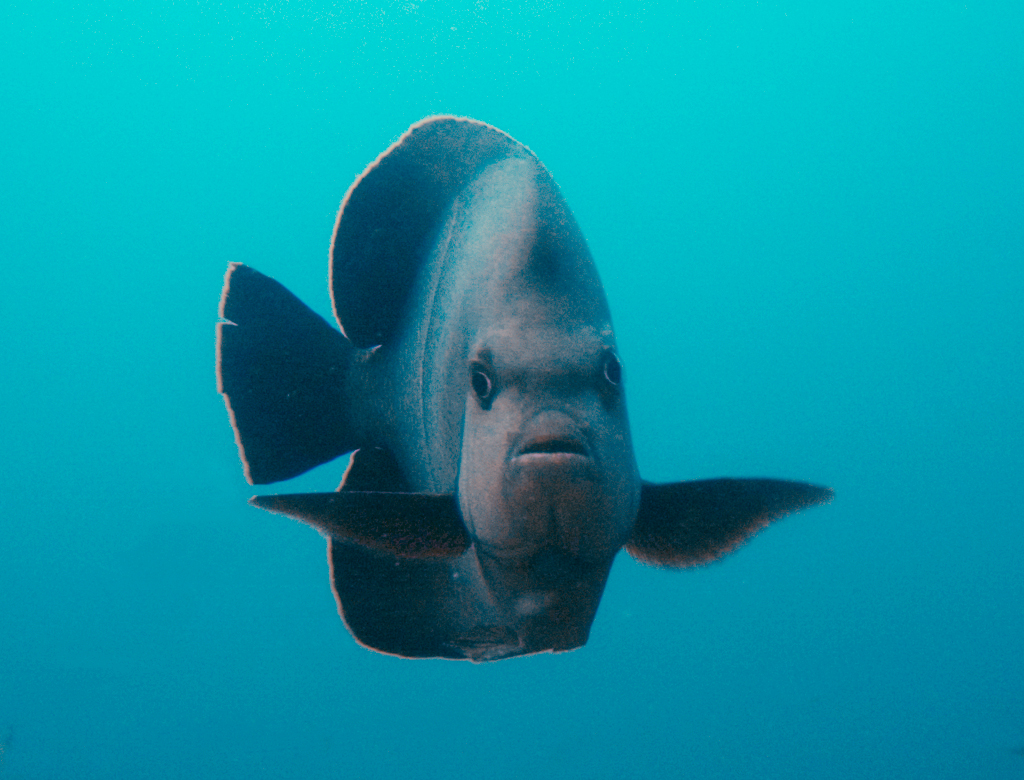

Conservation status
- Least Concern (IUCN 3.1)

Scientific classification
- Kingdom: Animalia
- Phylum: Chordata
- Class: Actinopterygii
- Order: Acanthuriformes
- Family: Pomacanthidae
- Genus: Pomacanthus
- Species: P. rhomboides

Binomial name
- Pomacanthus rhomboides (Gilchrist & Thompson, 1908)

Synonyms
- Holacanthus rhomboides Gilchrist & Thompson, 1908

= Old woman angelfish =

Species of fish

The old woman angelfish (Pomacanthus rhomboides) is a species of marine ray-finned fish, a marine angelfish belonging to the family Pomacanthidae. It is found in the western Indian Ocean.

== Description ==
The old woman angelfish, as an adult it is possibly the least colourful of the genus Pomacanthus. The adults are bronze brown on the anterior two thirds of their bodies with the posterior third being pale bluish grey. The juveniles resemble the juveniles of other species in the genus and are, therefore, more colourful than the adults. They are mainly black with thin, want blue and white lines. The dorsal fin contains 11-13 spines and 22-25 soft rays while the anal fin contains 3 spines and 21-23 soft rays. This species attains a maximum total length of 46 centimetres (18 in).

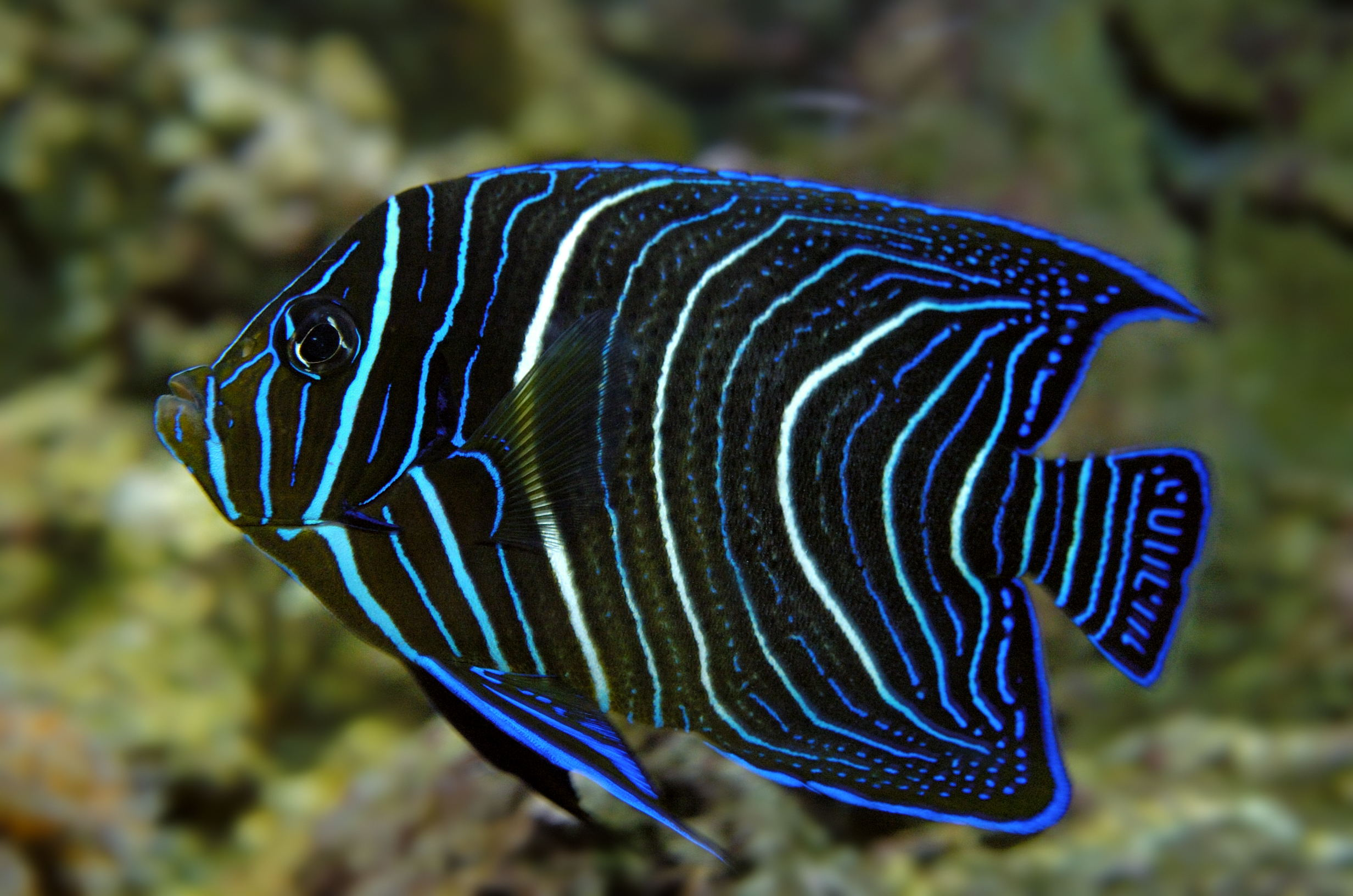
Juvenile

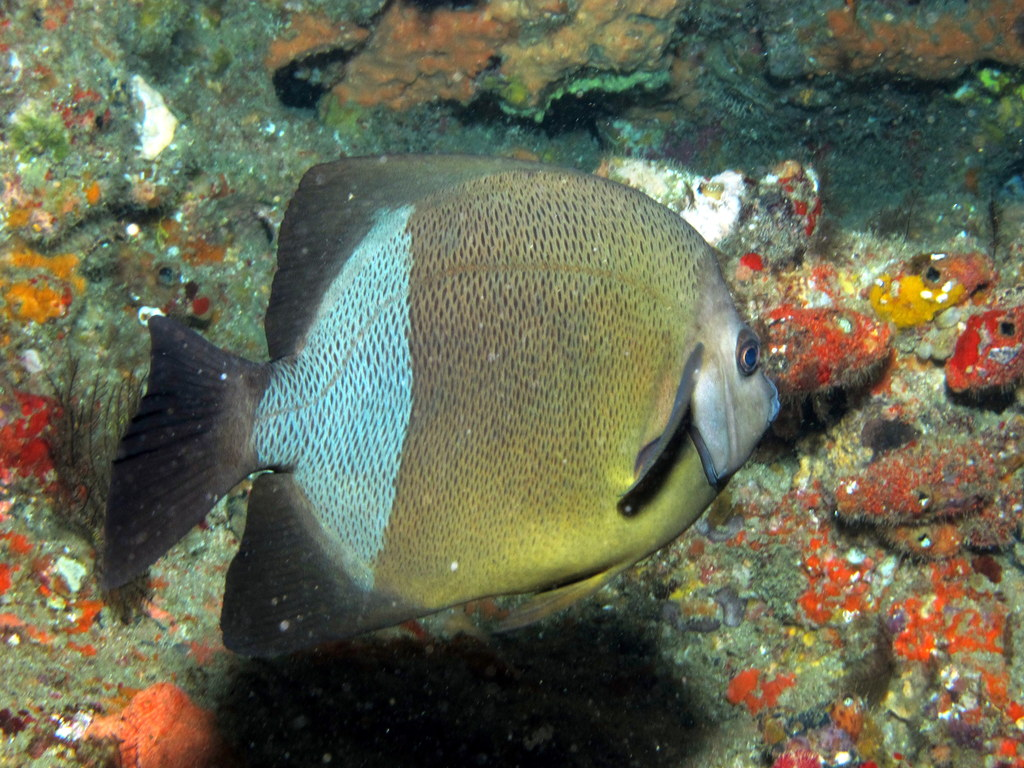
Adult

== Distribution ==
The old woman angelfish is found in the western Indian Ocean. It is found from Maputo Bay in Mozambique southwards along the coast of South Africa as far as Knysna in the Western Cape.

== Habitat and biology ==
The old woman angelfish is found along shorelines and on rocky reefs at depths between 5 and 30 m (16 and 98 ft). The juveniles are found in shallow tidal pools. The adults live in small groups close to the coast where they feed on algae and benthic invertebrates. They will occasionally swim near the surface to feed on plankton.

== Systematics ==
The old woman angelfish was first formally described in 1908 as Holacanthus rhomboides by the Scots ichthyologist John Dow Fisher Gilchrist (1866–1926) and his South African colleague William Wardlaw Thompson (died 1917) with the type locality given as KwaZulu-Natal. The species is placed by some authorities in the subgenus Acanthochaetodon,. The specific name of this species, rhomboides means "rhombus-like", possibly a reference to its deep, almost quadrangular body.

== Utilisation ==
The old woman angelfish has a range which does not overlap with the main areas of Africa's coast where fish are collected for the aquarium trade and is subsequently extremely rare in that trade.
