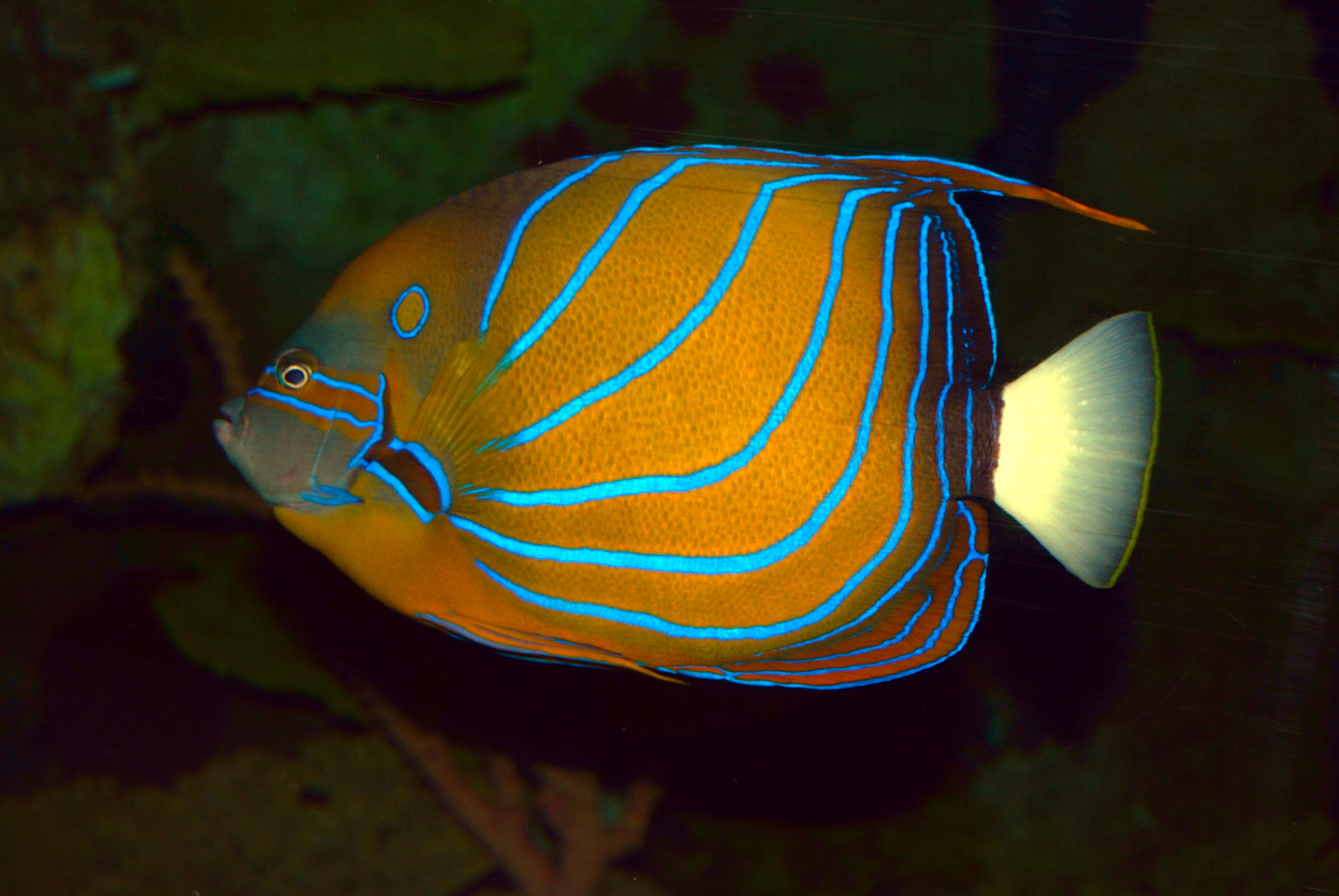

Conservation status
- Least Concern (IUCN 3.1)

Scientific classification
- Kingdom: Animalia
- Phylum: Chordata
- Class: Actinopterygii
- Order: Acanthuriformes
- Family: Pomacanthidae
- Genus: Pomacanthus
- Species: P. annularis

Binomial name
- Pomacanthus annularis (Bloch, 1787)

Synonyms
- Chaetodon annularis Bloch, 1787; Pomacanthodes annularis (Bloch, 1787)

= Bluering angelfish =

Species of fish

The bluering angelfish (Pomacanthus annularis), also known as the annularis angelfish and the blue king angelfish, is a species of marine ray-finned fish, a marine angelfish belonging to the family Pomacanthidae. It is member of the genus Pomacanthus, composed of large marine angelfish.

== Distribution ==
The bluering angelfish can be found in the Indo-West Pacific oceans from East Africa, throughout Indonesia and New Guinea to New Caledonia, north to southern Japan.

== Habitat ==
Bluering angelfishes inhabit coastal rocky coral reefs and may be also encountered in caves or on wrecks, at depths of 3–30 m (9.8–98.4 ft).

== Description ==
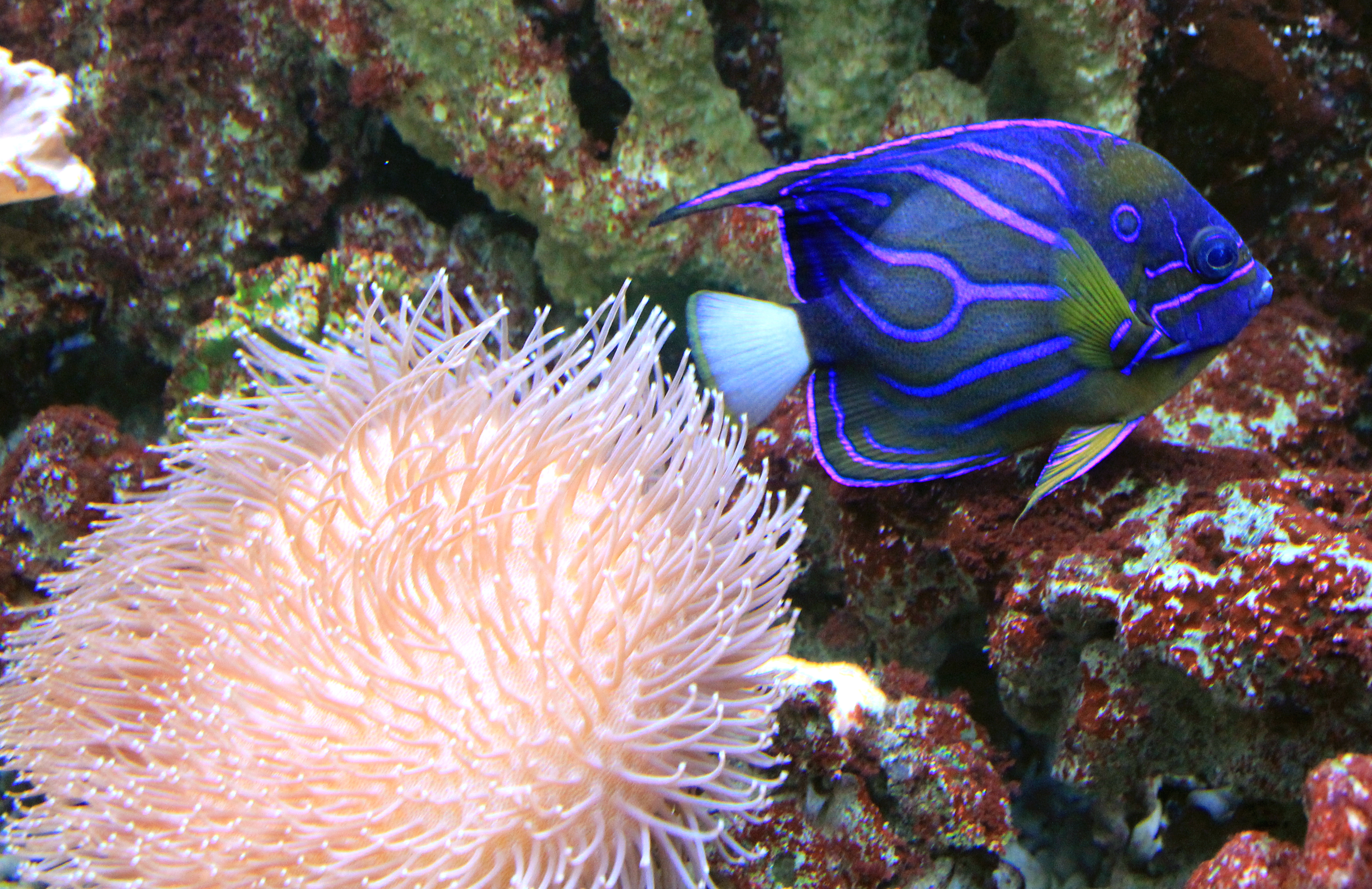
In Prague Sea aquarium

Bluering angelfish have adults which are mainly yellow with the body marked with obvious arcing blue lines and a blue circle shaped mark above the operculum. They frequently have an elongated tip to the dorsal fin and they have a white caudal fin with a yellow margin. They also have a pair of blue stripes across the face, one runs through the eye and the second is situated immediately beneath the eye. The juveniles have a bluish-black overall colour with thin white to blue coloured curved lines on their body. The dorsal fin has 13 spines and 20–21 soft rays while the anal fin contains 3 spines and 20 soft rays. This species attains a maximum total length of 45 cm (18 in).

== Biology and behavior ==
Bluering angelfishes are frequently encountered in pairs. Similarly to other species of the genus Pomacanthus these angelfishes live in harem, as the male defends a territory and controls a few females. After a courtship ritual males and females release eggs and sperm. At the beginning of life all juveniles are females (sequential hermaphrodite), becoming males during the development, with a complete color variation from the juvenile to adult stage. Juveniles prefer very shallow waters with rock or dead coral substrates and short filamentous algae. Adults mainly feed on zooplankton, sponges, filamentous algae and tunicates.

== Systematics ==
The bluering angelfish was first formally described in 1795 as Chaetodon tricolor by the German physician and naturalist Marcus Elieser Bloch (1723–1799) with the type locality given as the Indian Ocean. The species is placed by some authorities in the subgenus Acanthochaetodon,. The specific name of this species, annularis, means "ringed" which refers to the ring on the body above the gill cover.

== Utilisation ==
Bluering angelfish are infrequently found in the aquarium trade.

== Gallery ==
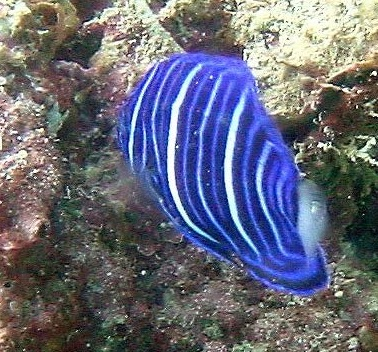
Pomacanthus annularis. Juvenile

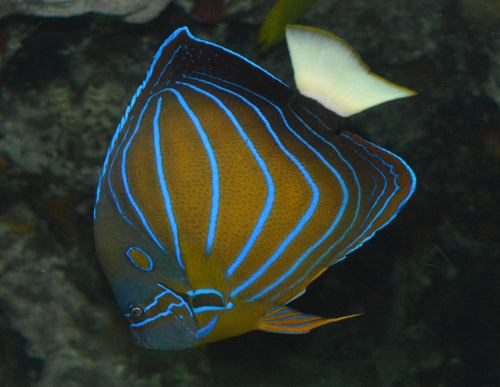
Adult

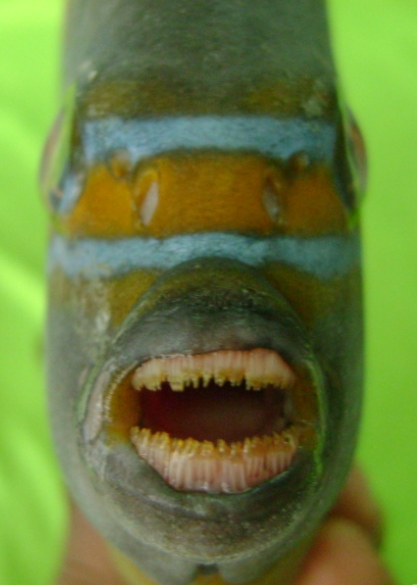
Denture, front view

Video clip
