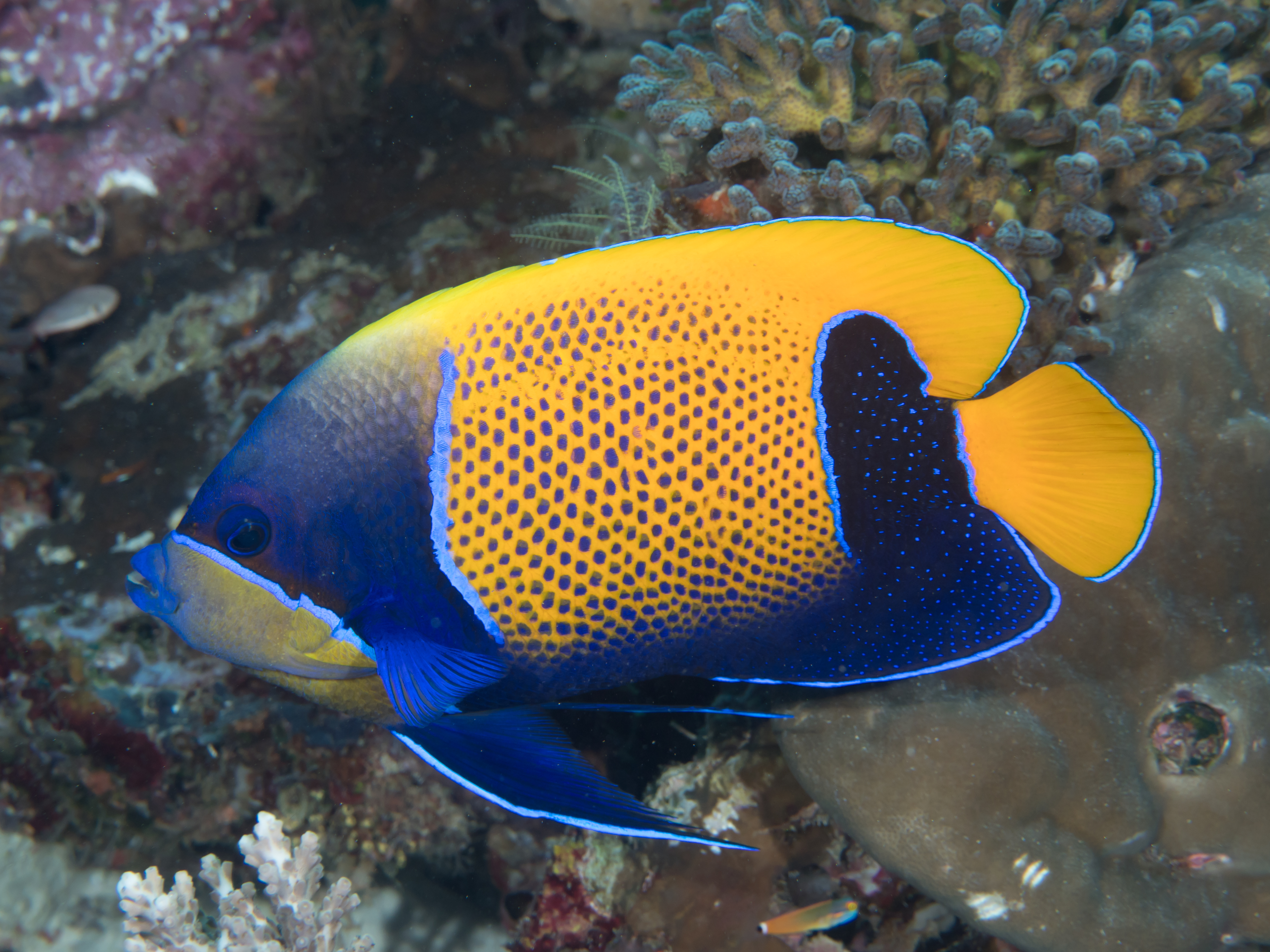

Conservation status
- Least Concern (IUCN 3.1)

Scientific classification
- Kingdom: Animalia
- Phylum: Chordata
- Class: Actinopterygii
- Order: Acanthuriformes
- Family: Pomacanthidae
- Genus: Pomacanthus
- Species: P. navarchus

Binomial name
- Pomacanthus navarchus (F. Cuvier, 1831)

Synonyms
- Euxiphipops navarchus (Cuvier, 1831); Holacanthus navarchus Cuvier, 1831; Pomacnthodes navarchus (Cuvier, 1831)

= Pomacanthus navarchus =

Species of fish

Pomacanthus navarchus, the blue-girdled angelfish or majestic angelfish, is a marine angelfish from the Indo-Pacific region. It occasionally makes its way into the aquarium trade. P. navarchus is one of the smallest of the larger species of angelfish. It grows to a maximum length of 28 centimetres (11 in), but is usually much smaller than this, and can live to be up to 21 years old. Younger fish stay closer to the shallows, but the more mature fish can be found up to 120 feet (37 m) deep. Majestic angelfish eat mainly sponges and tunicates. Juvenile fish are mostly blue in color with white stripes. As they mature, they take on a yellow coloration on the flanks, dorsal fin, and tail.

== Description ==
The body of this fish is laterally flattened. Adult fish have three main colored sections; the anterior section in front of the eyes and the front part of the body is lemon yellow; the central section is funnel-shaped and is deep blue, and the posterior section is reticulated in bright yellow and blue. The sections are separated by pale blue bands edged with black. The mouth and lips are blue as are the rays of the pectoral and anal fins, while the dorsal and caudal fins are yellow, edged with pale blue. There is a long spine on the gill cover which is used in defence. Juvenile fish are dark blue with slightly curved, white lateral stripes. The change from the juvenile to the adult coloring takes place quite abruptly, with little intermediate coloring.

== Distribution and habitat ==
Pomacanthus navarchus is native to the tropical Indo-Pacific region, its range extending from Indonesia and the Philippines to northern and eastern Australia, the Great Barrier Reef, Micronesia, and Hawaii. It can be found at depths down to about 40 m (130 ft) on outer reef slopes, channels and lagoons in coral-rich habitats.

== Ecology ==
Pomacanthus navarchus is territorial and is generally found alone, but occasionally in pairs or small groups. It inhabits the demersal zone, feeding on sponges, algae, tunicates, zooplankton and small invertebrates. It is a protogynous hermaphrodite, starting adult life as a female and later becoming a male.
