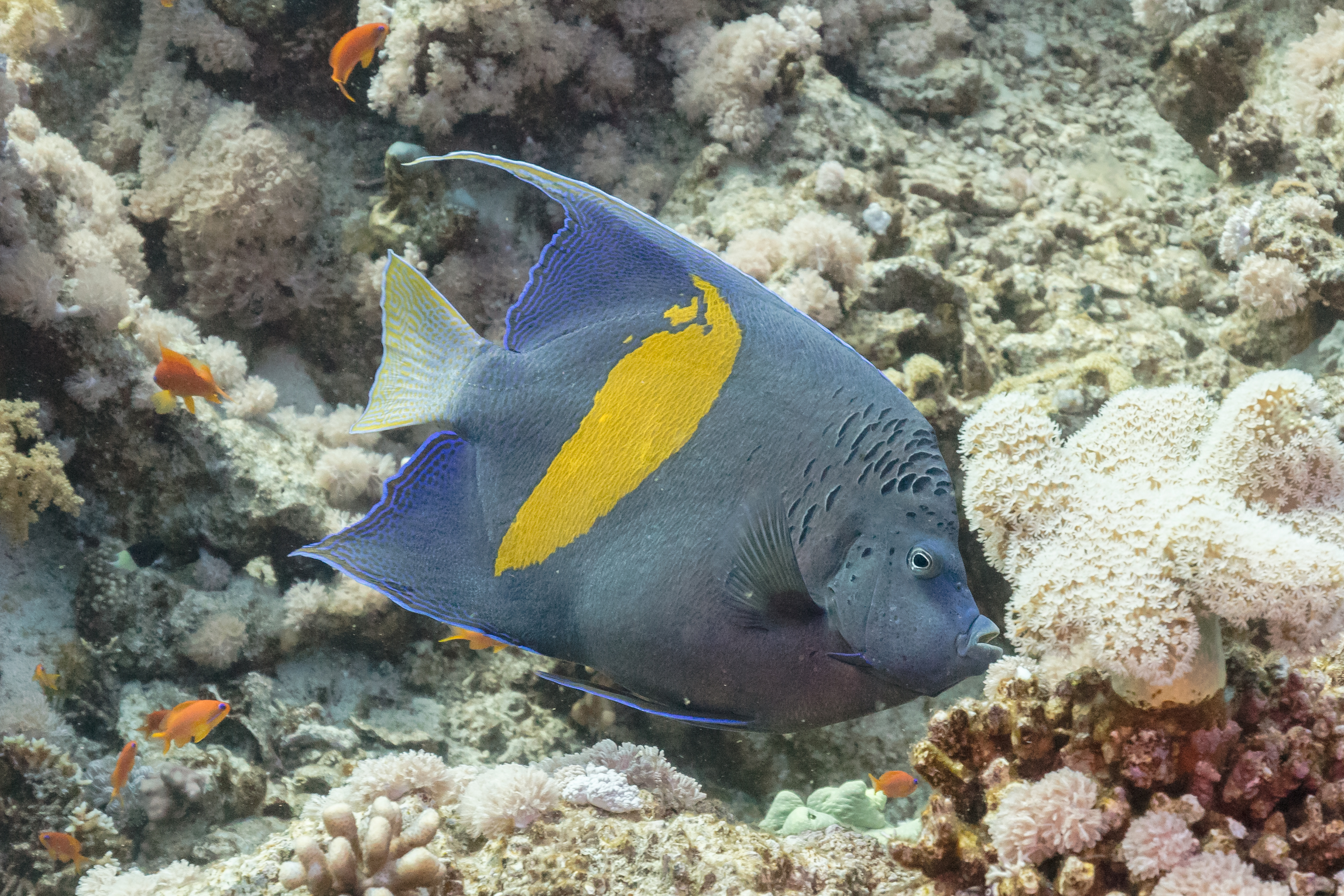
- In Ras Muhammad National Park, Red Sea, Egypt

Conservation status
- Least Concern (IUCN 3.1)

Scientific classification
- Kingdom: Animalia
- Phylum: Chordata
- Class: Actinopterygii
- Order: Acanthuriformes
- Family: Pomacanthidae
- Genus: Pomacanthus
- Species: P. maculosus

Binomial name
- Pomacanthus maculosus (Forsskål, 1775)

Synonyms
- Pomacanthops filamentosus Smith, 1955; Pomacanthus striatus (Rüppell, 1836); Pomacanthodes striatus (Rüppell, 1836); Holacanthus striatus Rüppell, 1836; Chaetodon maculosus Forsskål, 1775

= Pomacanthus maculosus =

Species of fish

Pomacanthus maculosus, the yellowbar angelfish, half-moon angelfish, yellow-marked angelfish, yellowband angelfish or yellow-blotched angelfish, is a species of marine ray-finned fish, a marine angelfish belonging to the family Pomacanthidae. It is found in the western Indian Ocean and, more recently, in the eastern Mediterranean Sea.

== Description ==
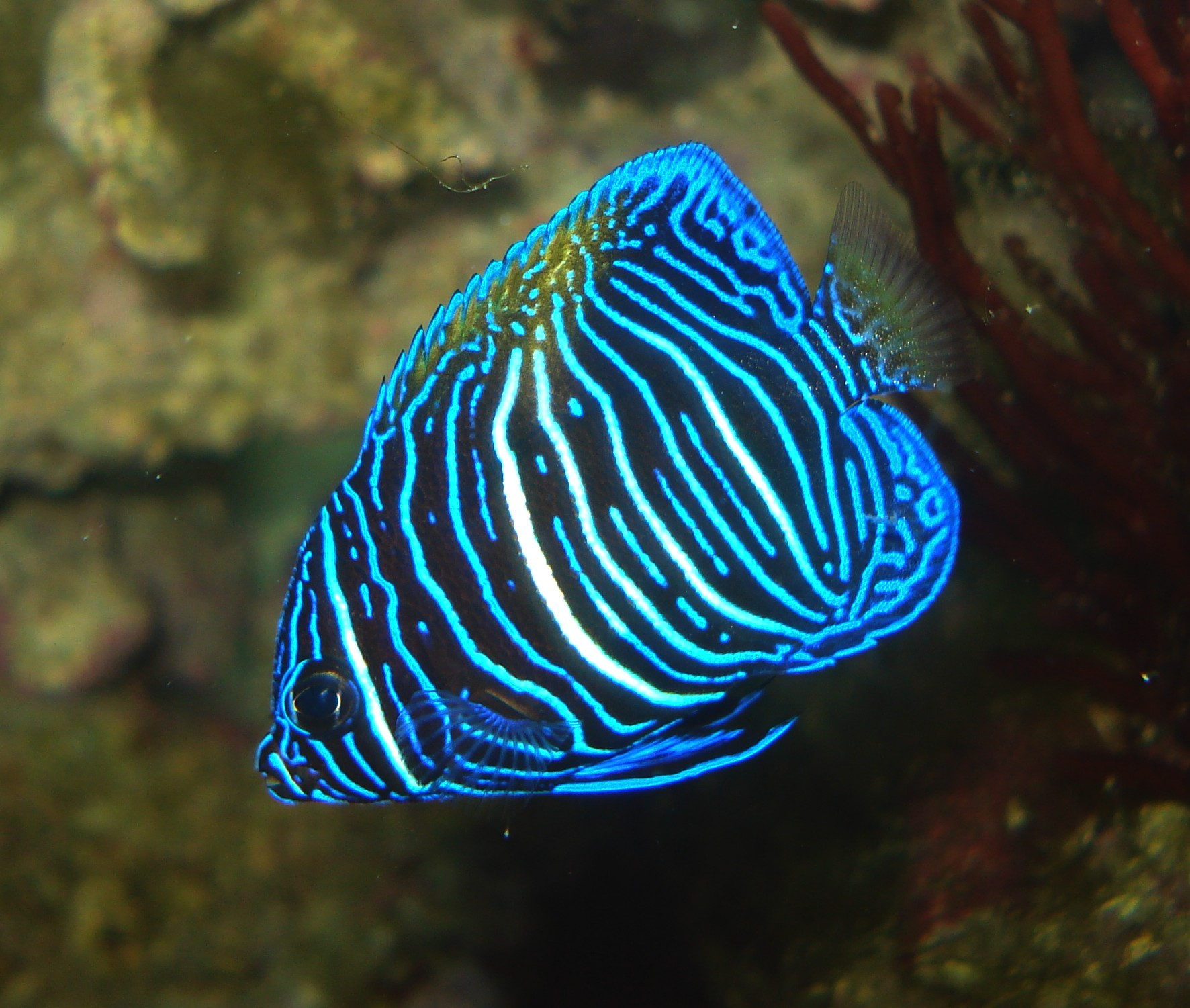
Juvenile

Pomacanthus maculosus has a deep and compressed body with a small mouth that is equipped with small bristle-like teeth. They have an obvious spine at the angle of the preoperculum. The adults have filaments extending back from the soft-rayed parts of the dorsal and anal fins, reaching past the caudal fin. The background colour of adults is brownish blue with each scale having a blue margin creating the impression that it is predominantly blue. There is an uneven, yellow bar close to the centre of the flanks with dark blue, vertically elongated spots towards the head. The caudal fin has wavy, blue lines on a pale yellow background. The juveniles are mainly black marked with many, arced, vertical blue lines and three broader white lines. Only the rear third of the caudal fin is yellow. The dorsal fin has 12–13 spines and 21 soft rays while the anal fin has 3 spines and 19–20 soft rays. This species attains a maximum total length of 50 cm (20 in).

== Distribution ==
Pomacanthus maculosus is found in the Red Sea, Persian Gulf and Gulf of Oman. It has been recorded on distinct but uncommon occasions since 2008 in the eastern Mediterranean Sea. It has also been recorded off Florida and Brazil, regarded as an instance of deliberate releases from an aquarium.

== Habitat and biology ==
Pomacanthus maculosus is found at depths of between 4 and 50 metres (13 and 164 ft). It is a solitary species that lives in sheltered areas, often where there is a mixture of coral and silt. Their diet is dominated by sponges and tunicates, although other invertebrates will be eaten opportunistically. The females attain sexual maturity when they reach around 5.5 years of age and a total length of 21.6 cm (8.5 in). The maximum longevity is thought to be 36 years old. Divers have noted that this is a curious species and is not shy. They are protogynous hermaphrodites and the older females can change sex to become males when there is a shortage of males. The larvae are planktonic.

== Systematics ==
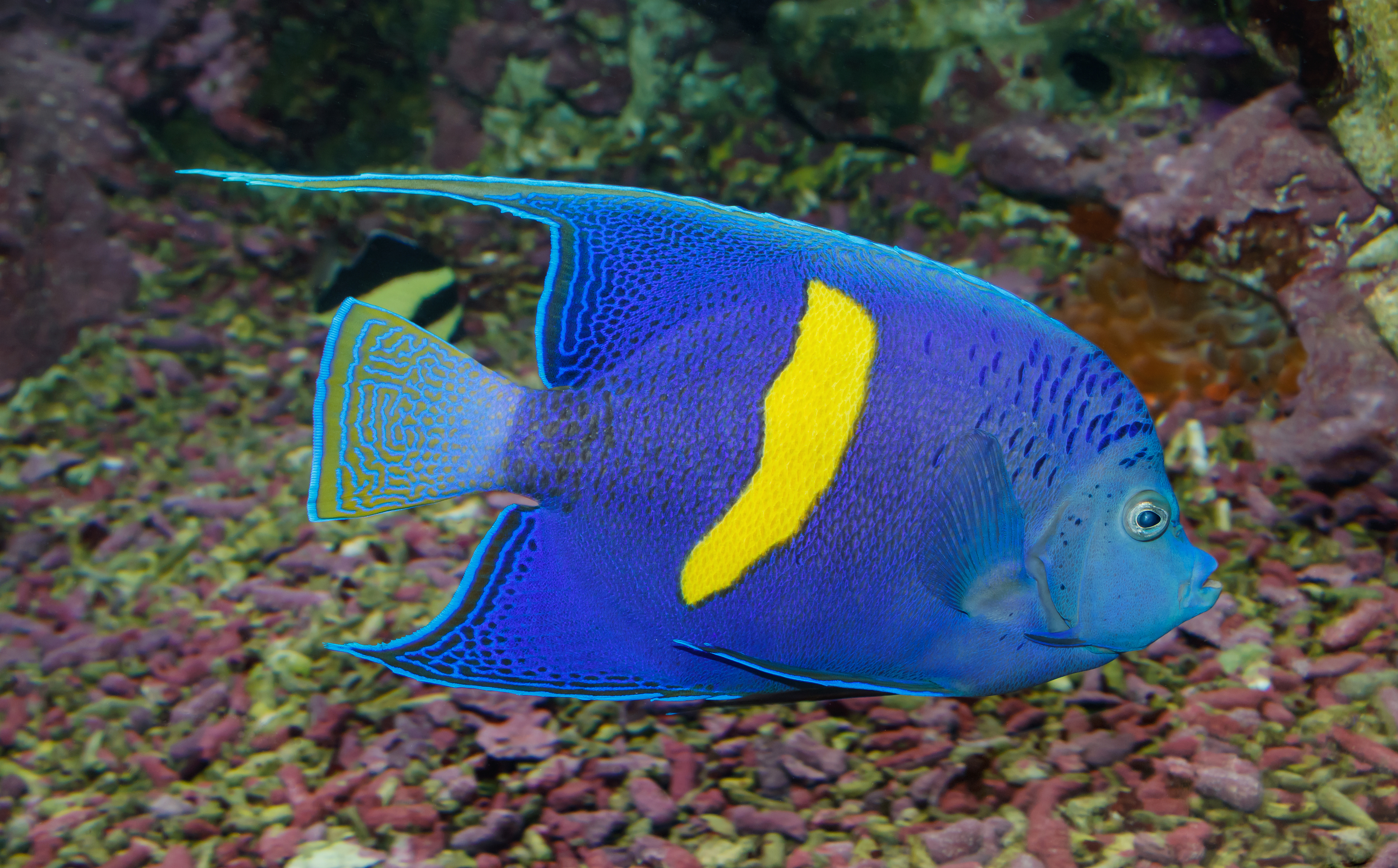
In captivity at Wilhelma, Germany

Pomacanthus maculosus was first formally described in 1775 as Chaetodon maculosus in 1775 by the Finnish born Swede Peter Forsskål (1732–1763) the type locality is given as Al-Luhayya, Yemen. Some authorities place this species in the subgenus Arusetta. The specific name maculosus means "spotted" and a reference to either the blue spots on the scales or the large yellow blotch.

== Utilisation ==
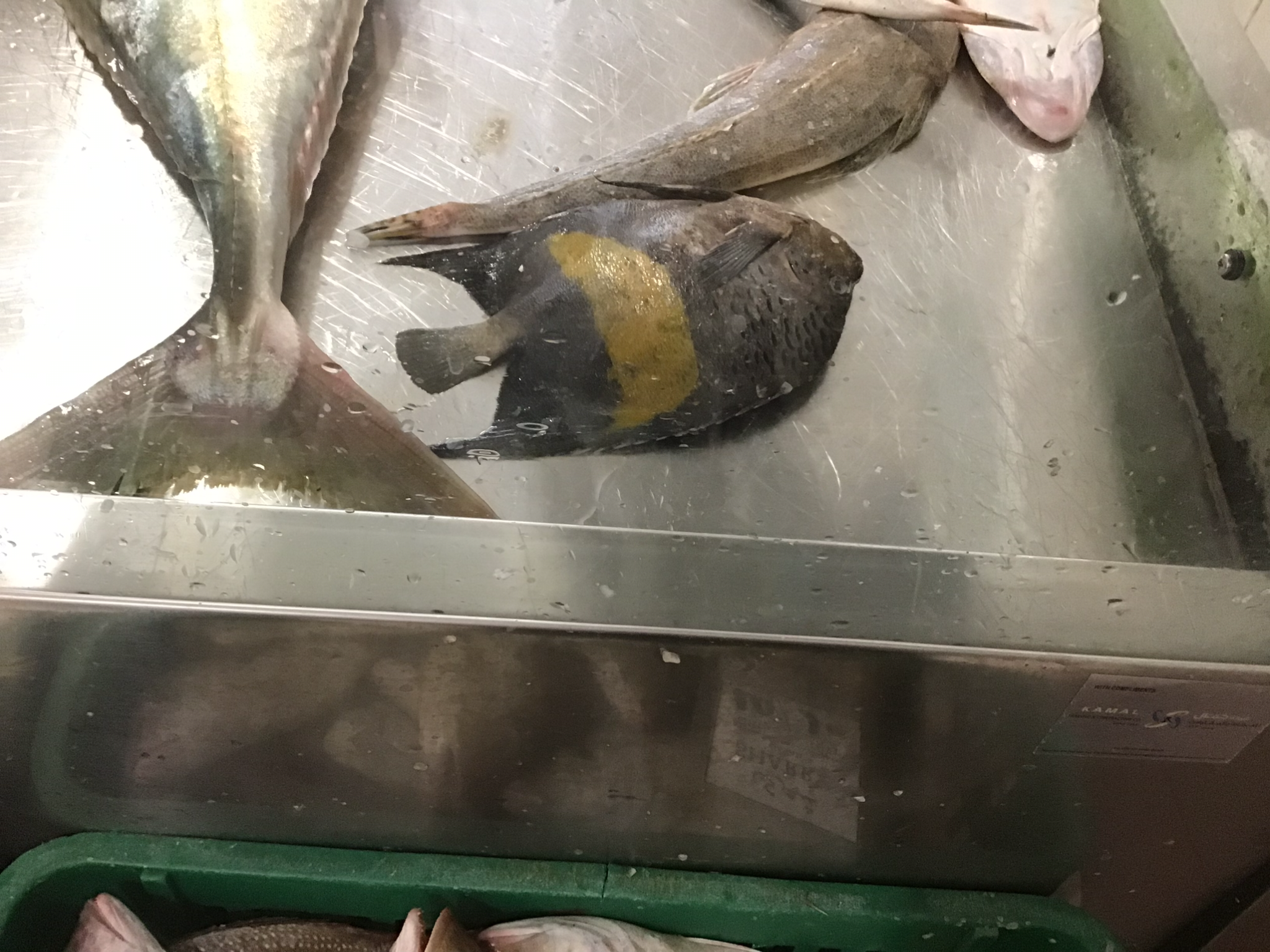
In a Qatari fish market. This species is relatively widespread in the region and can uncommonly be seen as a food fish. It is locally called "anfouz" (عنفوز)

Pomacanthus maculosus is occasionally collected for the aquarium trade. In some parts of the Persian Gulf it has been recorded in fish markets.
