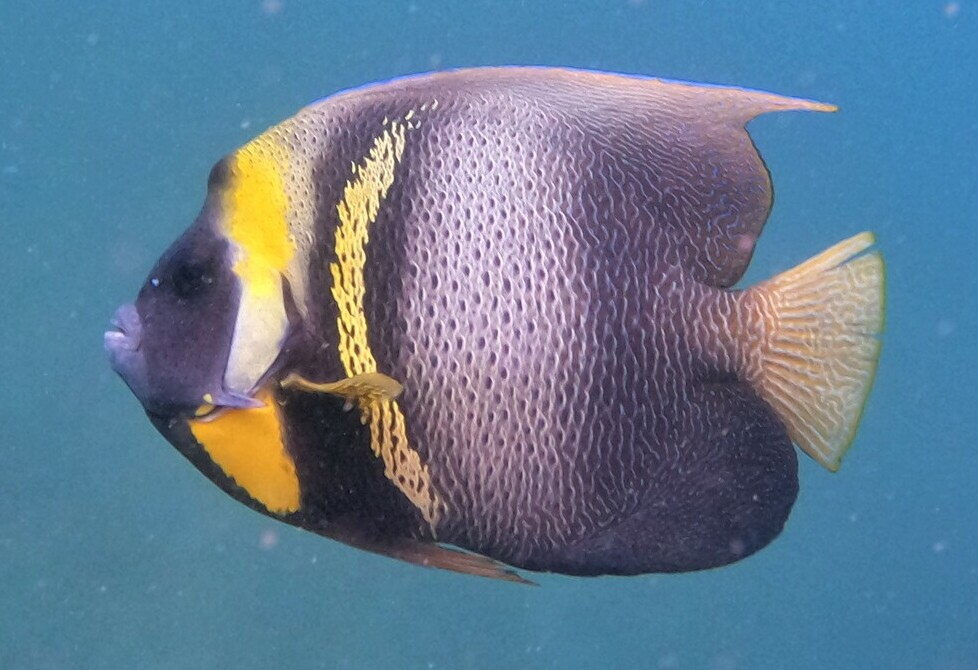

Conservation status
- Least Concern (IUCN 3.1)

Scientific classification
- Kingdom: Animalia
- Phylum: Chordata
- Class: Actinopterygii
- Order: Acanthuriformes
- Family: Pomacanthidae
- Genus: Pomacanthus
- Species: P. zonipectus

Binomial name
- Pomacanthus zonipectus (T. N. Gill, 1862)

Synonyms
- Pomacanthodes zonipectus Gill, 1862

= Pomacanthus zonipectus =

Species of fish

Pomacanthus zonipectus, the Cortez angelfish, is a species of marine ray-finned fish, a marine angelfish belonging to the family Pomacanthidae. It is from the Eastern Pacific. It occasionally makes its way into the aquarium trade.

== Taxonomy ==
Pomacanthus zonipectus was first formally described as Pomacanthodes zonipectus in 1862 by the American ichthyologist Theodore Nicholas Gill (1837–1914) with the type locality given as San Salvador in El Salvador. Some authorities place this species in the subgenus Pomacanthus. The specific name zonipectus is a compound of zona meaning "belt" and pectus meaning "breast", a reference to the dark-brown girdle on the breast to the rear of the pelvic and pectoral fins.

== Distribution ==
Pomacanthus zonipectus occurs in the eastern Pacific Ocean from Puerto Peñasco, in the northern Gulf of California of Mexico south to Peru. It has been recorded as a vagrant from southern California, the Galapagos Islands, Cocos Island and Malpelo Island, although it has not been reported from Clipperton Island.

== Description ==
Pomacanthus zonipectus has a deep, compressed body with a short, blunt snout with a small mouth which has numerous small bristle-like teeth. Its preoperculum has a large spine at its corner and a smooth vertical edge, while the area beneath the eye and the operculum have no spines. This species can reach a total body length of about 46 cm (18 in).

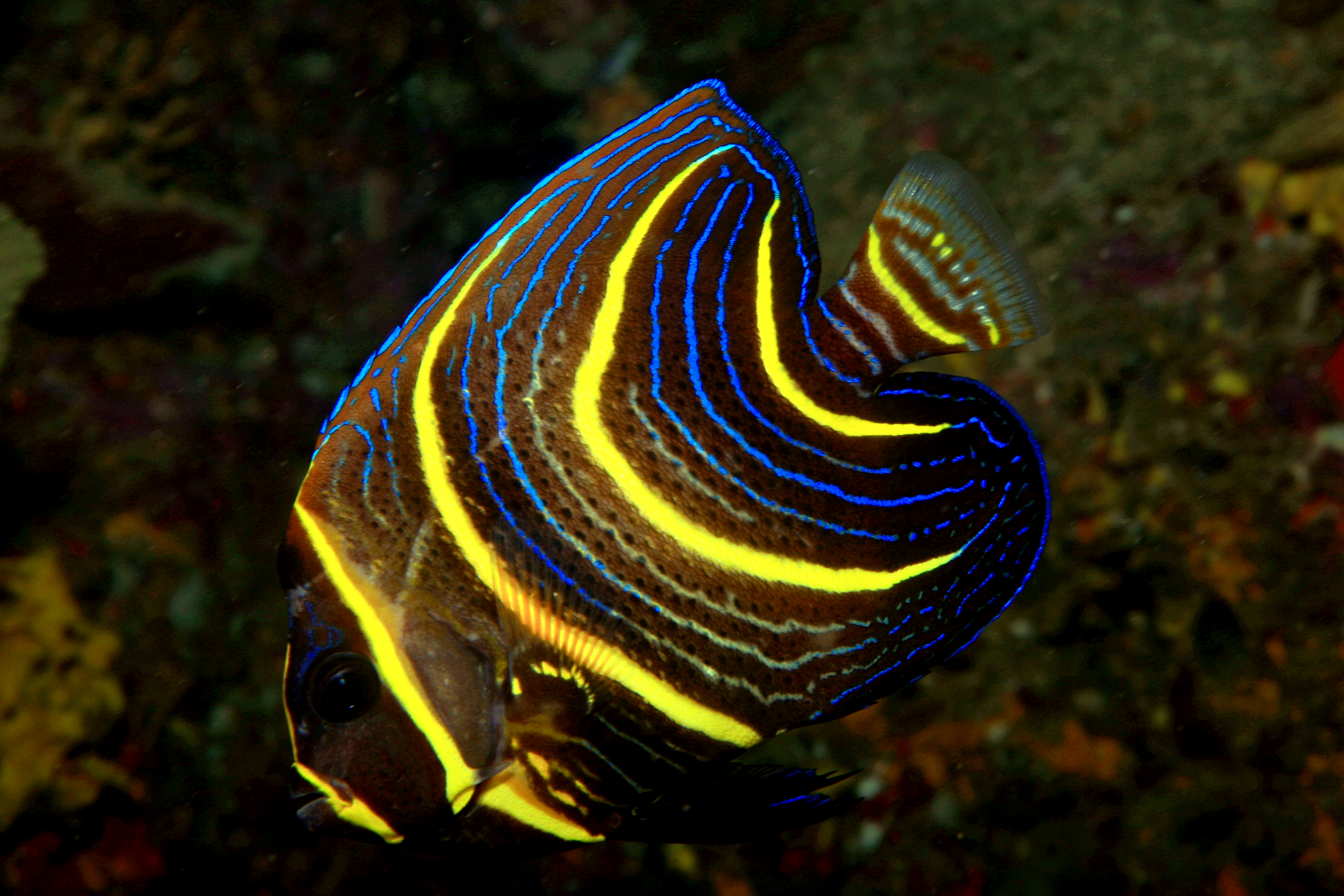
Juvenile, in Panama

Like other members of the genus Pomacanthus, has juveniles and adults which look quite different. The adults have the posterior half of the body covered by a matrix of crisscrossing lines, becoming yellowish-green in the tail. There is a large yellow arc to the rear of the pectoral fins and a bright yellow saddle across the nape. There is a pale grey section in the middle of the flanks. The juveniles have a brownish black background colour broken by 6 vertical vivid yellow bands that start on the face and finish at the caudal peduncle, between the yellow bars there are parallel blue bars. The dorsal and pelvic fins have bright blue margins. These angelfishes have 11 spines and 24–25 soft rays in the dorsal fin and 3 spines and 20–22 soft rays in the anal fin.

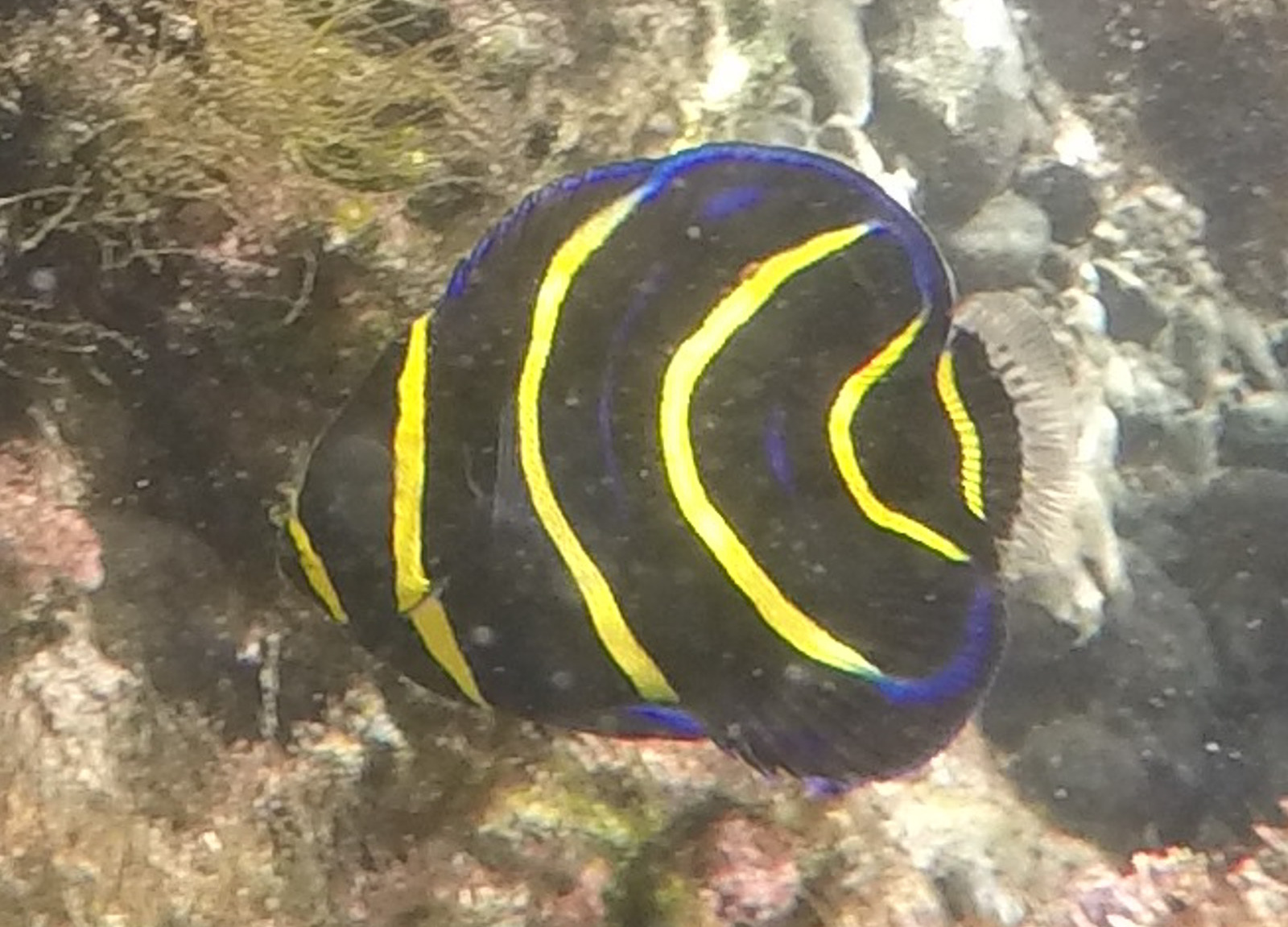
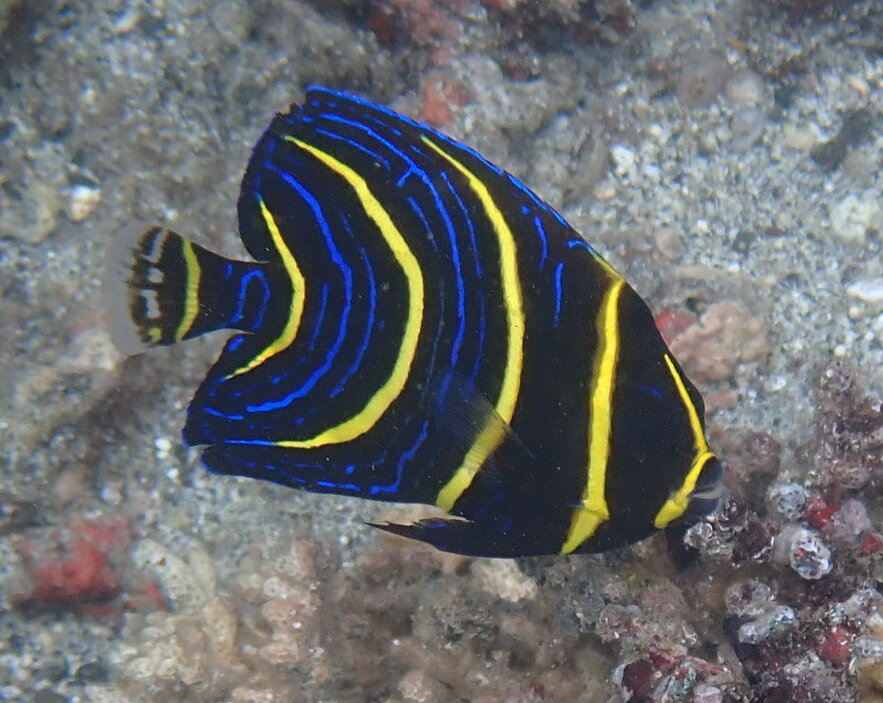
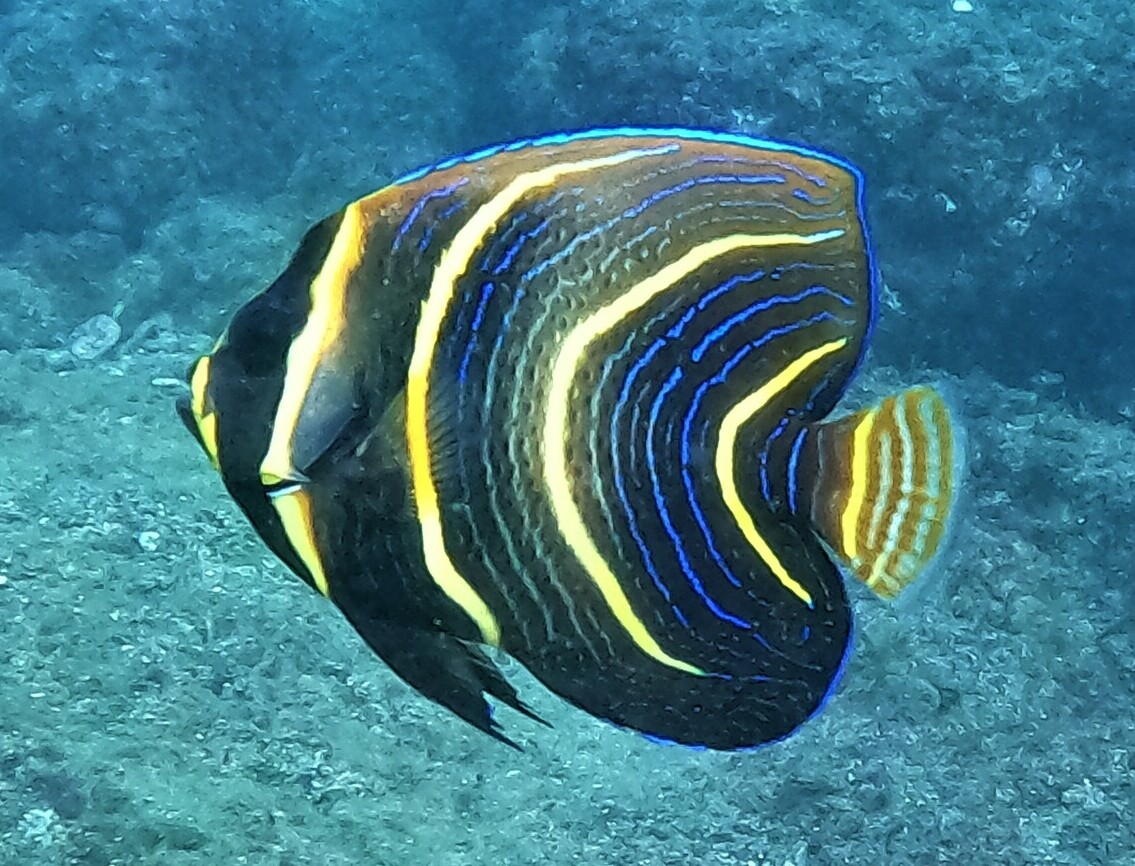
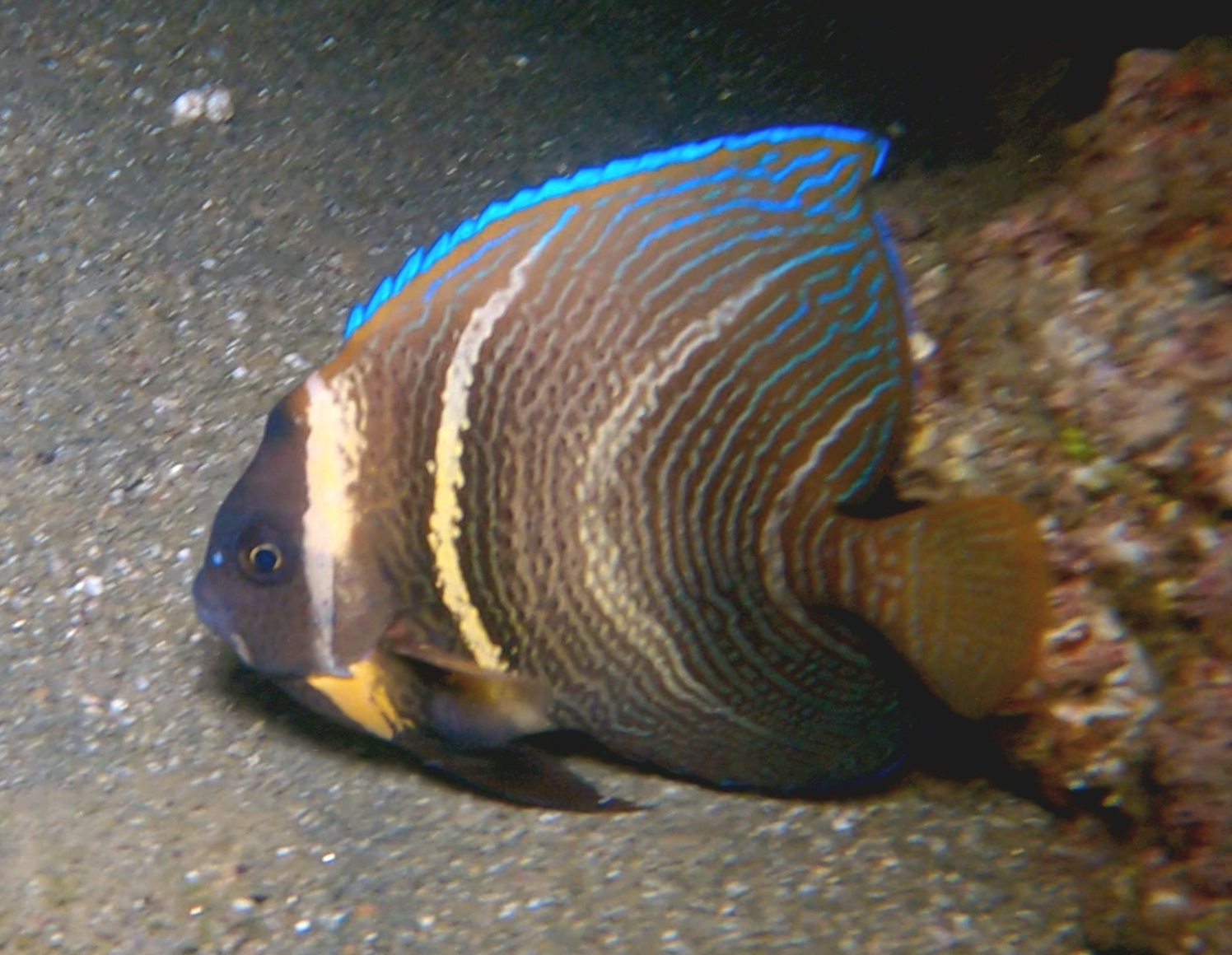
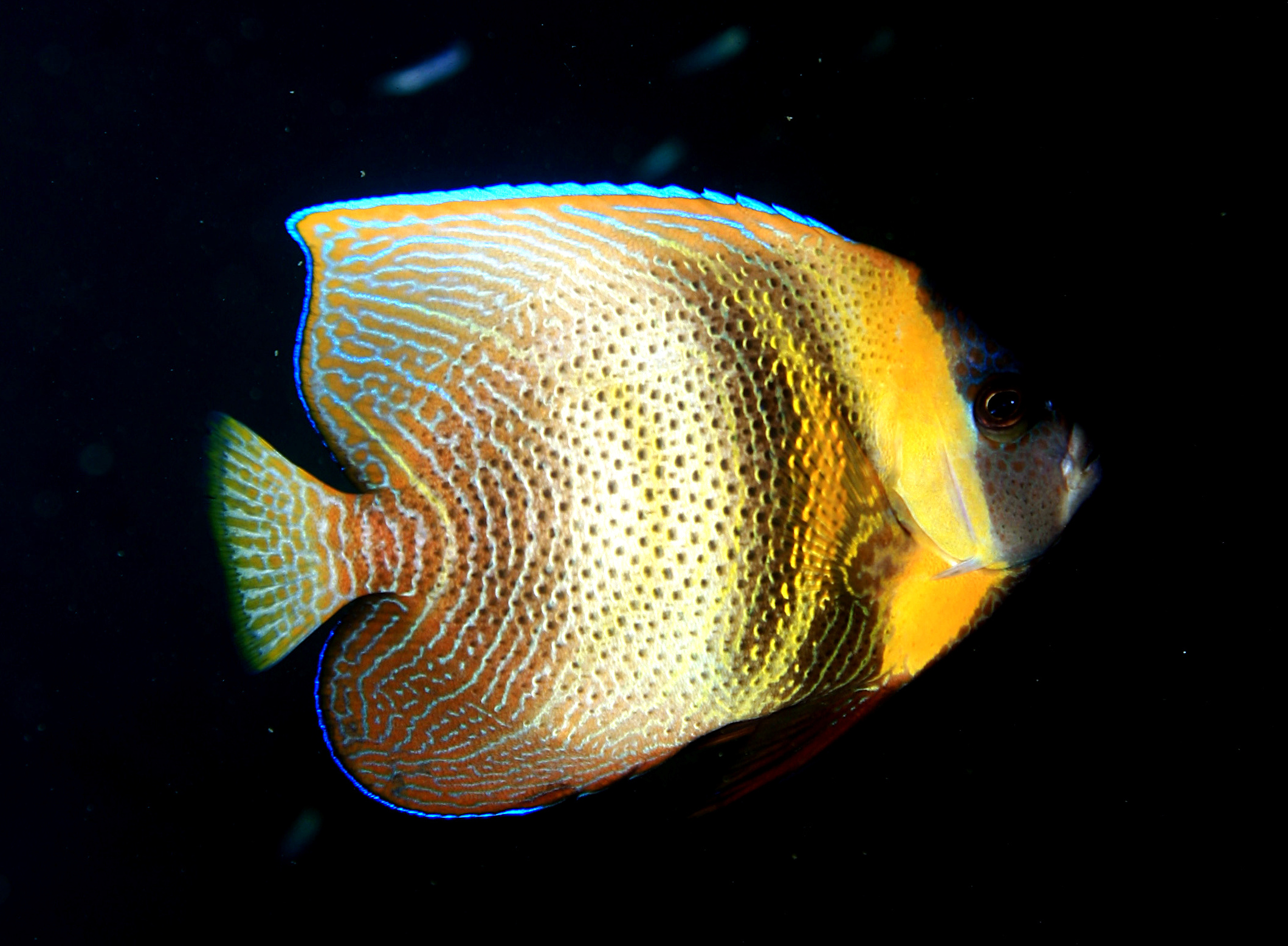
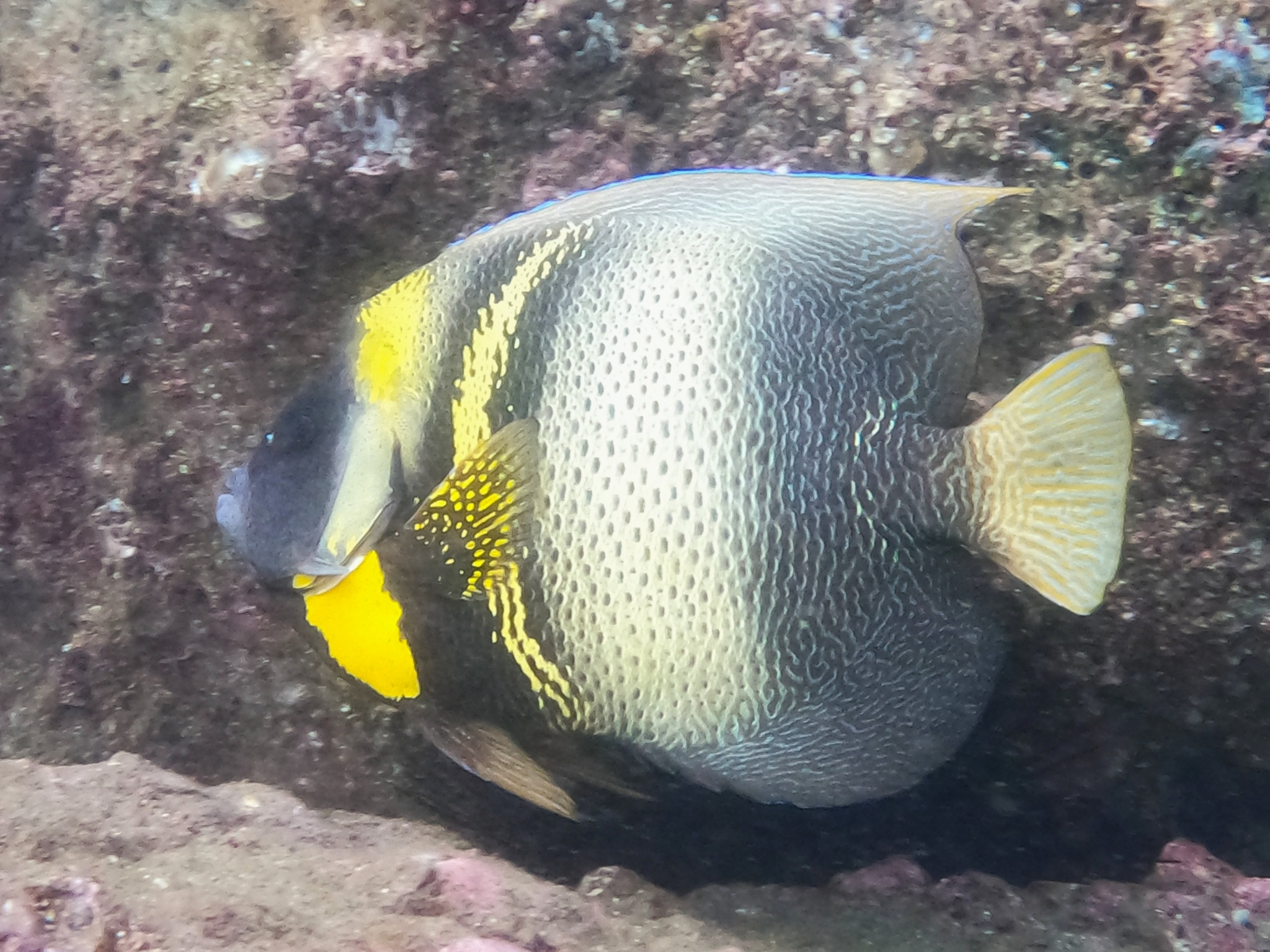
Growth series (from youngest to oldest)

== Habitat and biology ==
Pomacanthus zonipectus is found between depths of 6 and 50 m (20 and 164 ft). This species is diurnal, it feeds on food items taken from the substrate, mainly sponges but including tunicates, algae, bryozoans, hydroids and the eggs of fish. The adults are found in pairs which range widely over therefore while the solitary juveniles are territorial. Spawning happens from midsummer to early autumn and the juveniles are most abundant from August up to November. They appear to be monogamous. Juveniles are also found in tidal pools.

== Utilisation ==
Pomacanthus zonipectus occasionally appears in the aquarium trade.
