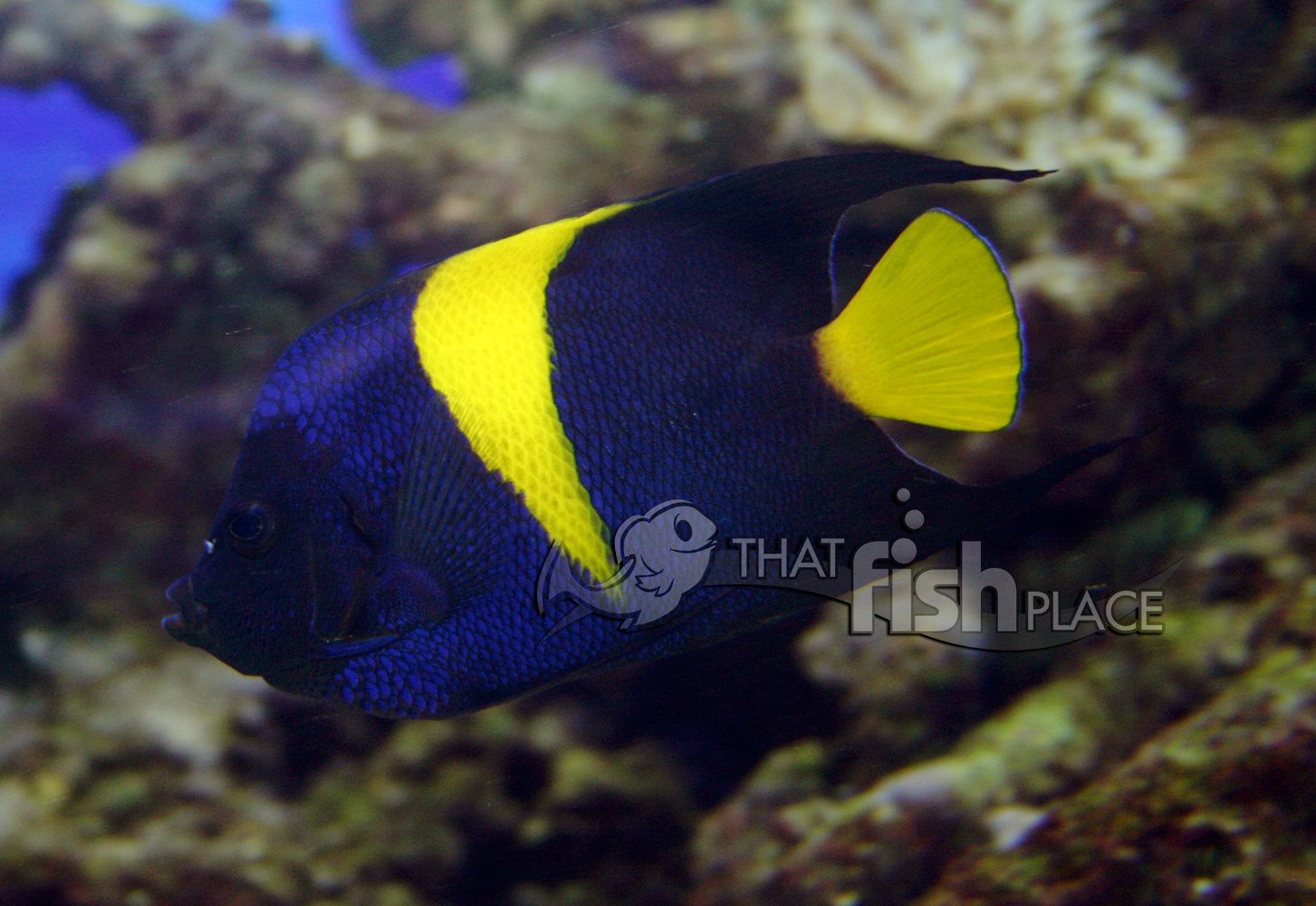

Conservation status
- Least Concern (IUCN 3.1)

Scientific classification
- Kingdom: Animalia
- Phylum: Chordata
- Class: Actinopterygii
- Order: Acanthuriformes
- Family: Pomacanthidae
- Genus: Pomacanthus
- Species: P. asfur

Binomial name
- Pomacanthus asfur (Forsskål, 1775)

Synonyms
- Chaetodon asfur Forsskål, 1775; Arusetta asfur (Forsskål, 1775)

= Pomacanthus asfur =

Species of fish

Pomacanthus asfur, the Arabian angelfish, is a species of marine ray-finned fish, a marine angelfish belonging to the family Pomacanthidae. It is found in the Western Indian Ocean.

== Description ==
Pomacanthus asfur has a completely different colour and pattern as a juvenile from that of the adult. Juveniles have a blue body which is marked with pale-blue and white stripes. As they mature they develop yellow markings on their dorsal and caudal fins. Until as fully mature adults they have an overall dark blue body with a blackish face, a yellow caudal fin and a broad crescent-shaped yellow band running vertically across the flanks. The dorsal fin has 12 spines and 19–20 soft rays while the anal fin has 3 spines and 19–20 soft rays, the pectoral fins each contain 17 or 18 rays. This species attains a maximum total length of 40 cm (16 in).

== Distribution ==
Pomacanthus asfur is principally found in the western Indian Ocean. Here it is found in the Red Sea and the Gulf of Aden and along the coast of eastern Africa as far south as Zanzibar. It is also found in the Persian Gulf. It has been recorded, as a probable release of aquarium specimens, on a few occasions off the eastern coast of Florida and from Malta.

Several specimens have been observed in the Mediterranean waters of Israel and Lebanon.

== Habitat and biology ==
Pomacanthus asfur has been recorded at depths between 3 and 30 metres (9.8 and 98.4 ft). It is a common species where there are relatively sheltered inshore reefs which have rich growth of soft and hard corals with a few patches of silty seabed. Their diet is dominated by sponges and tunicates. It is a solitary and shy fish that divers find difficult to approach and it is normally recorded near caves or crevices in the reef. This species is a protogynous hermaphrodite, the larger fish in a pair will change sex to become male.

== Systematics ==
Pomacanthus asfur had its first formal described published in 1775 by the Danish zoologist Johan Christian Fabricius (1745–1808) but it has commonly been attributed to Finnish born Swede Peter Forsskål (1732–1763) the type locality is given as Al-Luhayya, Yemen. Some authorities place this species in the subgenus Arusetta, of which it is the type species The specific name asfur is this species Arabic name in Yemen.

== Utilisation ==
Pomacanthus asfur is infrequently found in the aquarium trade. It has been bred in captivity and captive bred specimens are sometimes marketed as "half-moon angelfish".
