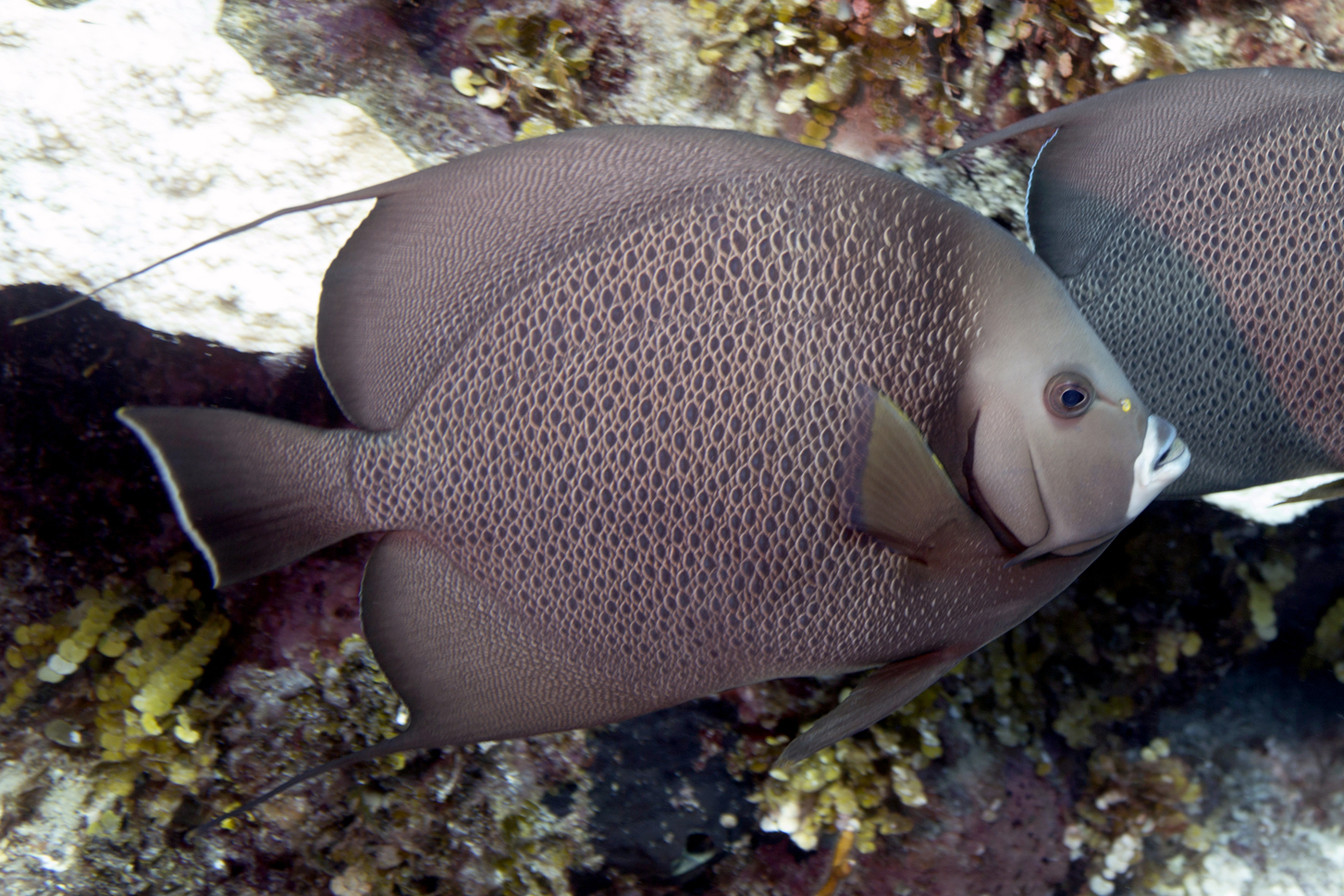
- Gray angelfish (Pomacanthus arcuatus)

Scientific classification
- Kingdom: Animalia
- Phylum: Chordata
- Class: Actinopterygii
- Division: Teleostei
- Order: Acanthuriformes
- Family: Pomacanthidae
- Genus: Pomacanthus; Lacépède, 1802

Type species
- Chaetodon arcuatus (Linnaeus, 1758)

Species
- See text

Synonyms
- Acanthochaetodon Bleeker, 1876; Arusetta Fraser-Brunner, 1933; Euxiphipops Fraser-Brunner, 1934; Heteropyge Fraser-Brunner, 1933; Pomacanthops J. L. B. Smith, 1955

= Pomacanthus =

Pomacanthus Temporal range: Late Cretaceous to Present

Genus of fishes

Pomacanthus from Ancient Greek poma, meaning "cover", and ákantha, meaning "spine", is a genus of marine angelfish that is usually found around reefs and coral. Some of the notable places one can see these vari-coloured fish includes the Maldives, Sri Lanka, and Sipidan off the southern coast of Sabah, Malaysia. Generally the patterns and colors of these fish undergo a major transformation from juvenile to adult forms. The juveniles may even appear to be a different species.

== Taxonomy ==
The genus Pomacanthus was created in 1802 by the French naturalist Bernard Germain de Lacépède (1756-1825) with the type species being designated as Chaetodon arcuatus.

The name is a compound of poma meaning"lid" and acanthus which means "thorn", a reference to the prominents spine on the rear margin of the operculum, a feature shared by all the marine angelfishes.

=== Subgenera ===
Some authorities divide the genus up into the following subgenera:

- Pomacanthus Lacépède, 1802
  - Pomacanthus (Pomacanthus) arcuatus
  - Pomacanthus (Pomacanthus) paru
  - Pomacanthus (Pomacanthus) zonipectus
- Acanthochaetodon Bleeker, 1876
  - Pomacanthus (Acanthochaetodon) annularis
  - Pomacanthus (Acanthochaetodon) chrysurus
  - Pomacanthus (Acanthochaetodon) imperator
  - Pomacanthus (Acanthochaetodon) rhomboides
- Arusetta Fraser-Brunner, 1933
  - Pomacanthus (Arusetta) asfur
  - Pomacanthus (Arusetta) maculosus
  - Pomacanthus (Arusetta) semicirculatus
- Euxiphipops Fraser-Brunner 1934
  - Pomacanthus (Euxiphipops) navarchus
  - Pomacanthus (Euxiphipops) sexstriatus
  - Pomacanthus (Euxiphipops) xanthometopon

== Species ==
The following 13 species are classified within the genus Pomacanthus:

Adult	Juvenile	Scientific name	Common name	Distribution
		Pomacanthus annularis (Bloch, 1787)	Bluering angelfish	Indo-West Pacific oceans from East Africa, throughout Indonesia and New Guinea to New Caledonia, north to southern Japan.
		Pomacanthus arcuatus (Linnaeus, 1758)	Gray angelfish	Western Atlantic from New England to the vicinity of Rio de Janeiro, Brazil, and also the Bahamas, the Gulf of Mexico, and the Caribbean, including the Antilles
		Pomacanthus asfur (Forsskål, 1775)	Arabian angelfish	Red Sea and the Gulf of Aden to Zanzibar. Also found in the Persian Gulf and Mediterranean Sea.
		Pomacanthus chrysurus (Cuvier, 1831)	Goldtail angelfish	Western Indian Ocean (South Africa including Comoros, Seychelles and Madagascar)
		Pomacanthus imperator (Bloch, 1787)	Emperor angelfish	Indian and Pacific Oceans, from the Red Sea to Hawaii, the Austral Islands and Mediterranean
		Pomacanthus maculosus (Forsskål, 1775)	Yellowbar angelfish	Persian Gulf, northwestern Indian Ocean, the Red Sea and Mediterranean
		Pomacanthus navarchus (Cuvier, 1831)	Blue-girdled angelfish	Indo-Pacific region
		Pomacanthus paru (Bloch, 1787)	French angelfish	Western Atlantic from New York and the Bahamas to Brazil, and also the Gulf of Mexico and the Caribbean, including the Antilles, Roatan, and the eastern Atlantic from around Ascension Island and St. Paul's Rocks
		Pomacanthus rhomboides (Gilchrist & Thompson, 1908)	Old woman angelfish	Western Indian Ocean
		Pomacanthus semicirculatus (Cuvier, 1831)	Semicircle angelfish	East coast of Africa to Fiji and Japan, the east coast of Australia and New Caledonia.
		Pomacanthus sexstriatus (Cuvier, 1831)	Sixbar angelfish	South Pacific reefs, most commonly the Great Barrier Reef of Australia's north-east coast
		Pomacanthus xanthometopon (Bleeker, 1853)	Yellowface angelfish, Blueface angelfish	Maldive Islands, Malaysia, Indonesia, Japan, Taiwan, the Philippines, northern Australia and Micronesia
		Pomacanthus zonipectus (Gill, 1862)	Cortez angelfish	Eastern Pacific
