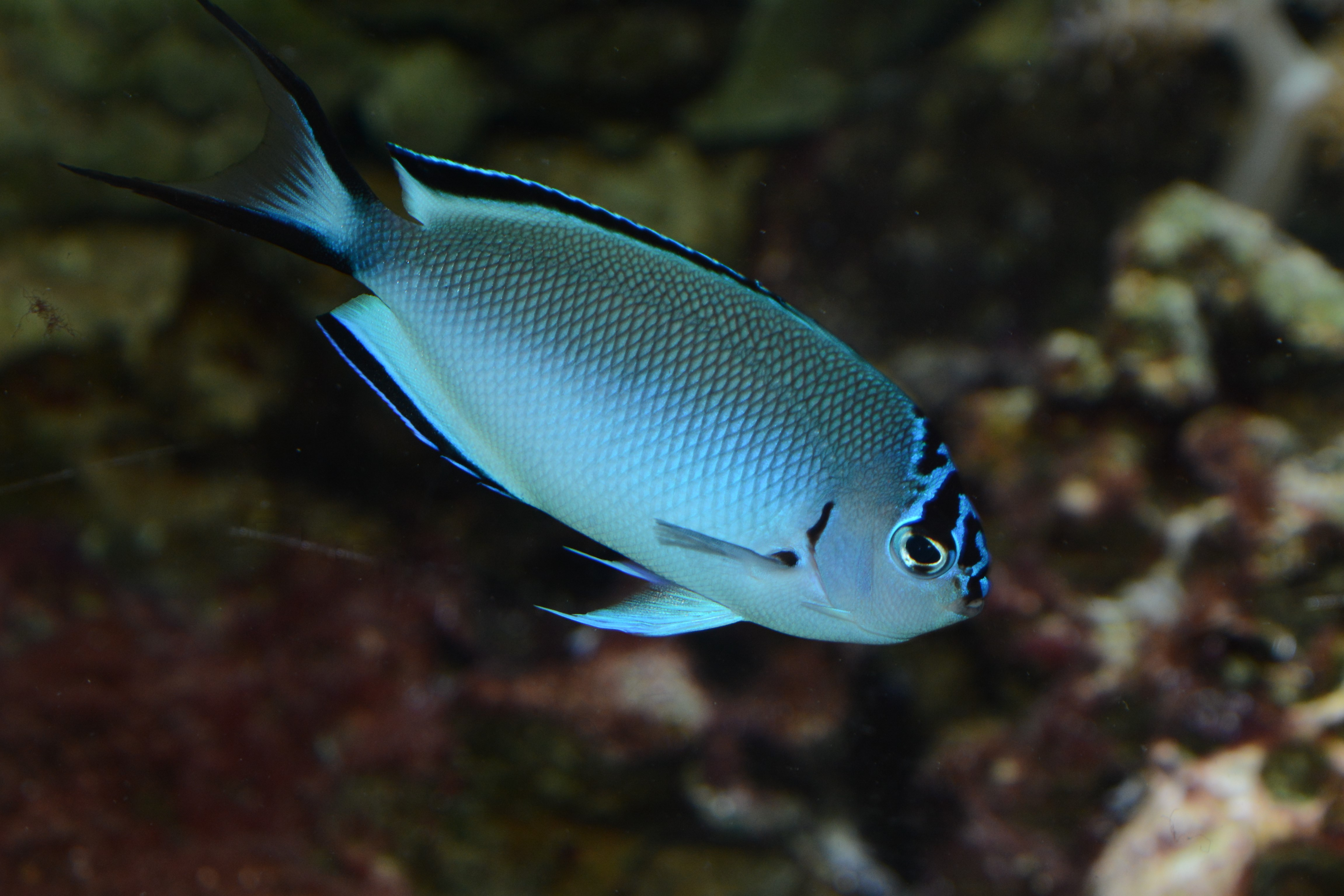

Conservation status
- Least Concern (IUCN 3.1)

Scientific classification
- Kingdom: Animalia
- Phylum: Chordata
- Class: Actinopterygii
- Order: Acanthuriformes
- Family: Pomacanthidae
- Genus: Genicanthus
- Species: G. watanabei

Binomial name
- Genicanthus watanabei (Yasuda & Tominaga, 1970)

Synonyms
- Holacanthus watanabei Yasuda & Tominaga, 1970

= Genicanthus watanabei =

Species of fish

Genicanthus watanabei, the blackedged angelfish or Watanabe's angelfish, is a species of marine ray-finned fish, a marine angelfish belonging to the family Pomacanthidae. It is found in the Pacific Ocean.

== Description ==
Genicanthus watanabei, like the other angelfishes in the genus Genicanthus, shows sexual dichromatism, the males and females show differences in colour and pattern. The males are pale blue to bluish-grey on the upper third of their bodies with the lower two thirds having 8 horizontal, thin black stripes, the highest of these end in a patch of yellow colour. The females are overall light blue colour with wide black bars across their head and a black spot on the snout. In both males and females there is a wide submarginal band on the dorsal and anal fins, and on the lobes of the caudal fin. Juveniles somewhat resemble females in colour. In both sexes the forked tail narrows at its base to create a "swallow tail". The dorsal fin contains 15-16 spines and 15-16 soft rays while the anal fin has 3 spines and 14-17 soft rays. This species attains a maximum total length of 15 centimetres (5.9 in).

== Distribution ==
Genicanthus watanabei is found in the Pacific Ocean. It ranges from Taiwan east to the Cook Islands and Tuamotu Archipelago, north to the Ryukyu Islands and south to New Caledonia and the Austral Islands. It also occurs on the Great Barrier Reef with juveniles reaching as far south as Sydney.

== Habitat and biology ==
Genicanthus watanabei occurs at depths between 12 and 81 metres (39 and 266 ft). Here can be found on the outward slopes of reefs and on drop offs where there is a strong current. It feeds on plankton in the water column. Like all of their congeners the blackedged angelfish is a protogynous hermaphrodite, starting their life as female and the dominant female may change into a male They have a lek mating system. In a lek, the large males control territories. And the more numerous females are able to move freely between the territories of the males. When the females are receptive to mating the males display to them, swimming on their sides and vibrating their fins. The largest and most dominant males prefer to breed with the younger females.

== Systematics ==
Genicanthus watanabei was first formally described in 1970 by the Japanese ichthyologists Fujio Yasuda and Yoshiaki Tominaga with the type locality given as Onna Beach on Okinawa. The specific name honours the Japanese ichthyologist Masao Watanabe of Waseda University in Tokyo, who originally collected this fish but identified it as Genicanthus caudovittatus.

== Utilisation ==
Genicanthus watanabei is not a frequently traded species in the aquarium trade. Those specimens which do enter the trade mostly come from the Philippines and from Melanesia.
