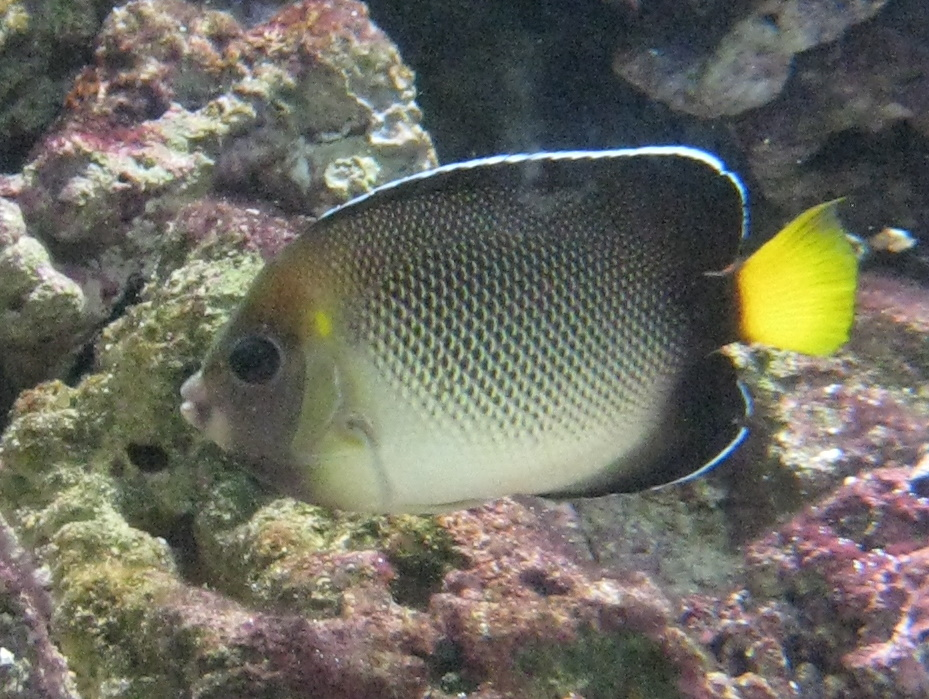
- Apolemichthys xanthurus at Cinéaqua aquarium

Conservation status
- Least Concern (IUCN 3.1)

Scientific classification
- Kingdom: Animalia
- Phylum: Chordata
- Class: Actinopterygii
- Order: Acanthuriformes
- Family: Pomacanthidae
- Genus: Apolemichthys
- Species: A. xanthurus

Binomial name
- Apolemichthys xanthurus (Bennett, 1833)

Synonyms
- Holacanthus xanthurus Bennett, 1833

= Apolemichthys xanthurus =

Species of fish

Apolemichthys xanthurus, the Indian yellowtail angelfish, is a species of marine angelfish belonging to the family Pomacanthidae. Other common names include cream angelfish, smoke angelfish, and yellowtail black angelfish. It is found in the Indian Ocean.

== Description ==
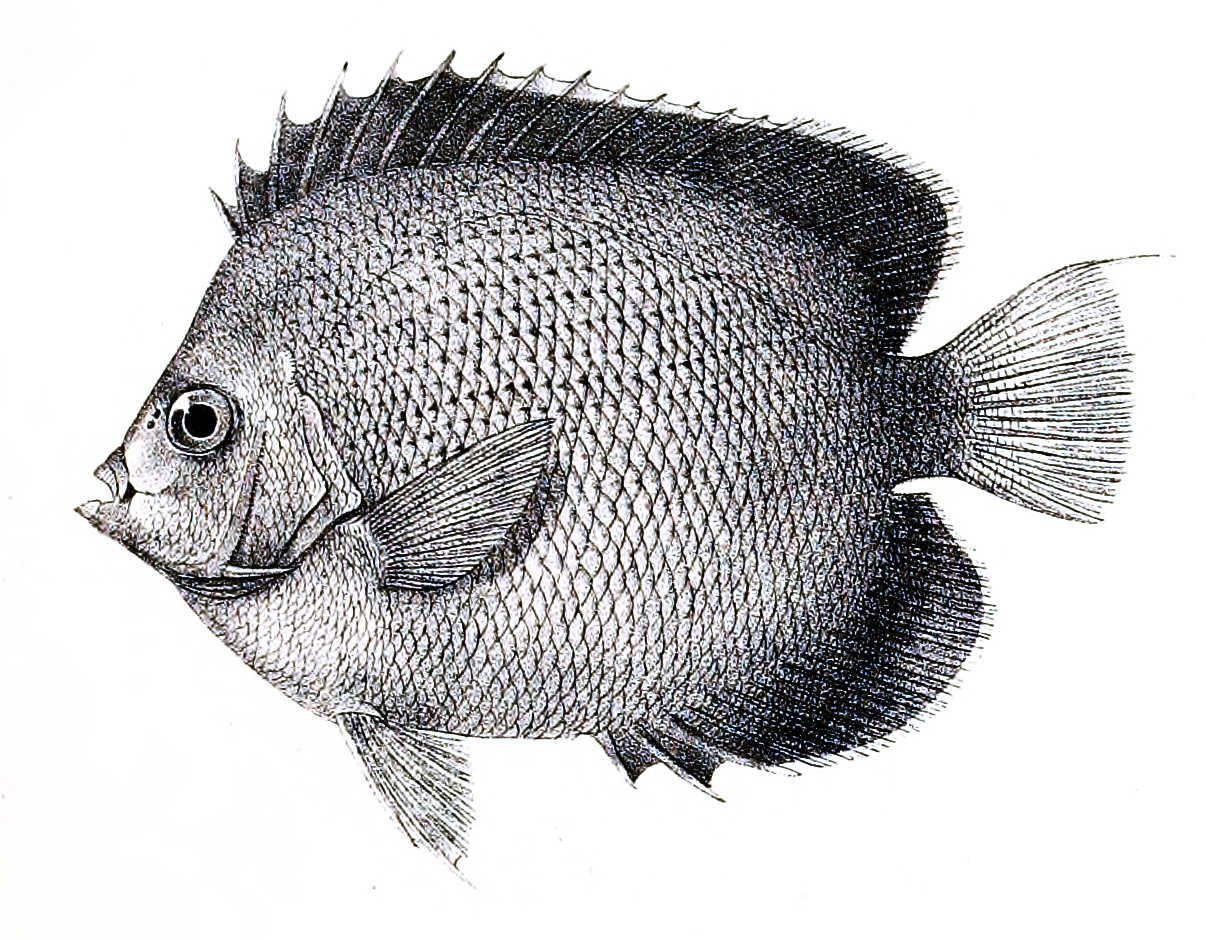

Apolemichthys xanthurus has a body with a cream background colour with a network of dark lines on the scales creating a lattice pattern over this. The edges of the body are a solid dark colour. The caudal fin is bright yellow while the dorsal and anal fins are black with a white margin. Like the closely related Apolemichthys xanthotis this species has a yellow spot on the upper preoperculum but the black on the head does not extend as far as this spot, contrasting less with its background. The juveniles have a wide black band running over the eye and an oblique area of black on the back, this patch fades as the fish matures. The dorsal fin contains 14 spines and 17–19 soft rays while the anal fin has 3 spines and 17–18 soft rays. This species attains a maximum total length of 15 centimetres (5.9 in).

== Distribution ==
Apolemichthys xanthurus is found in the Indian Ocean. It occurs in the Mascarenes, the Maldives, Sri Lanka and the eastern coast of India. It has been recorded off Myanmar and Thailand and reported from Sulawesi.

== Habitat and biology ==
Apolemichthys xanthurus is typically encountered as solitary individuals or in pairs at depths of 5 to 85 metres (16 to 279 ft) on coral and rocky reefs. They feed on a variety of crustaceans, sponges and algae.

== Systematics ==
Apolemichthys xanthurus was first formally described in 1950 as Holacanthus xanthotis by the British naturalist Edward Turner Bennett (1797–1836) with the type locality given as Sri Lanka. Its specific name xanthurus means "yellow tail" and refers to the yellow tail which also gives this species one of its common names. Within the genus Apolemichthys this species seems to be more closely related to A. griffisi of the Western Pacific Ocean and the allopatric A. xanthotis of the Indian Ocean. This species is thought to have hybridised with A. trimaculatus, the resulting hybrids being described as A. armitagei.

== Utilisation and conservation status ==
Apolemichthys xanthurus is common in the aquarium trade and among the marine angelfishes it is one of the hardiest and easiest to maintain in captivity. Collection from the wild is limited, only 100 were allowed to be exported from the Maldives in 2003, and is not considered a threat to the species which is categorised as Least Concern by the IUCN.
