= Genicanthus takeuchii =

Conservation status
- Least Concern (IUCN 3.1)

Scientific classification
- Kingdom: Animalia
- Phylum: Chordata
- Class: Actinopterygii
- Order: Acanthuriformes
- Family: Pomacanthidae
- Genus: Genicanthus
- Species: G. takeuchii

Binomial name
- Genicanthus takeuchii Pyle, 1997

Species of fish

Genicanthus takeuchii, the spotted angelfish or Takeuchi's angelfish, is a species of marine ray-finned fish, a marine angelfish belonging to the family Pomacanthidae. It is found in the northwestern Pacific Ocean

== Description ==
Genicanthus takeuchii, like the other angelfishes in the genus Genicanthus, shows sexual dichromatism, the males and females show differences in colour and pattern. The male is greyish white on the upper body with six to eight horizontal stripes, while the lower body is pale white. The dorsal fin and the caudal fin are both marked with large black spots. Females have an overall colour of greyish white with a dense pattern of black spots on the upper body and caudal fin. The juveniles have a honeycomb pattern on the upper body. The dorsal fin contains 15 spines and 16 soft rays while the anal fin has 3 spines and 17-18 soft rays. This species attains a maximum total length of 25 centimetres (9.8 in).

== Distribution ==
Genicanthus takeuchii is found in the northwestern Pacific Ocean. It is restricted to Marcus Island and the Ogasawara Islands to the southeast of Japan. They have also been found in the Marianas Islands.

== Habitat and biology ==
Genicanthus takeuchii is a little known species of deep coral reefs at depths between 25 and 60 metres (82 and 197 ft).

== Systematics ==
Genicanthus takeuchii was first formally described in 1997 as Holocanthus semifasciatus by the American ichthyologist Richard L. Pyle with the type locality given as Ani-jima, Mansakunohama in the Ogasawara Islands of Japan. The specific name honours the discoverer of this species, the Japanese diver Hiroshi Takeuchi. This species is known to hybridise with the Japanese swallow (Genicanthus semifasciatus).

== Utilisation ==
Genicanthus takeuchii does not appear in the aquarium trade.
