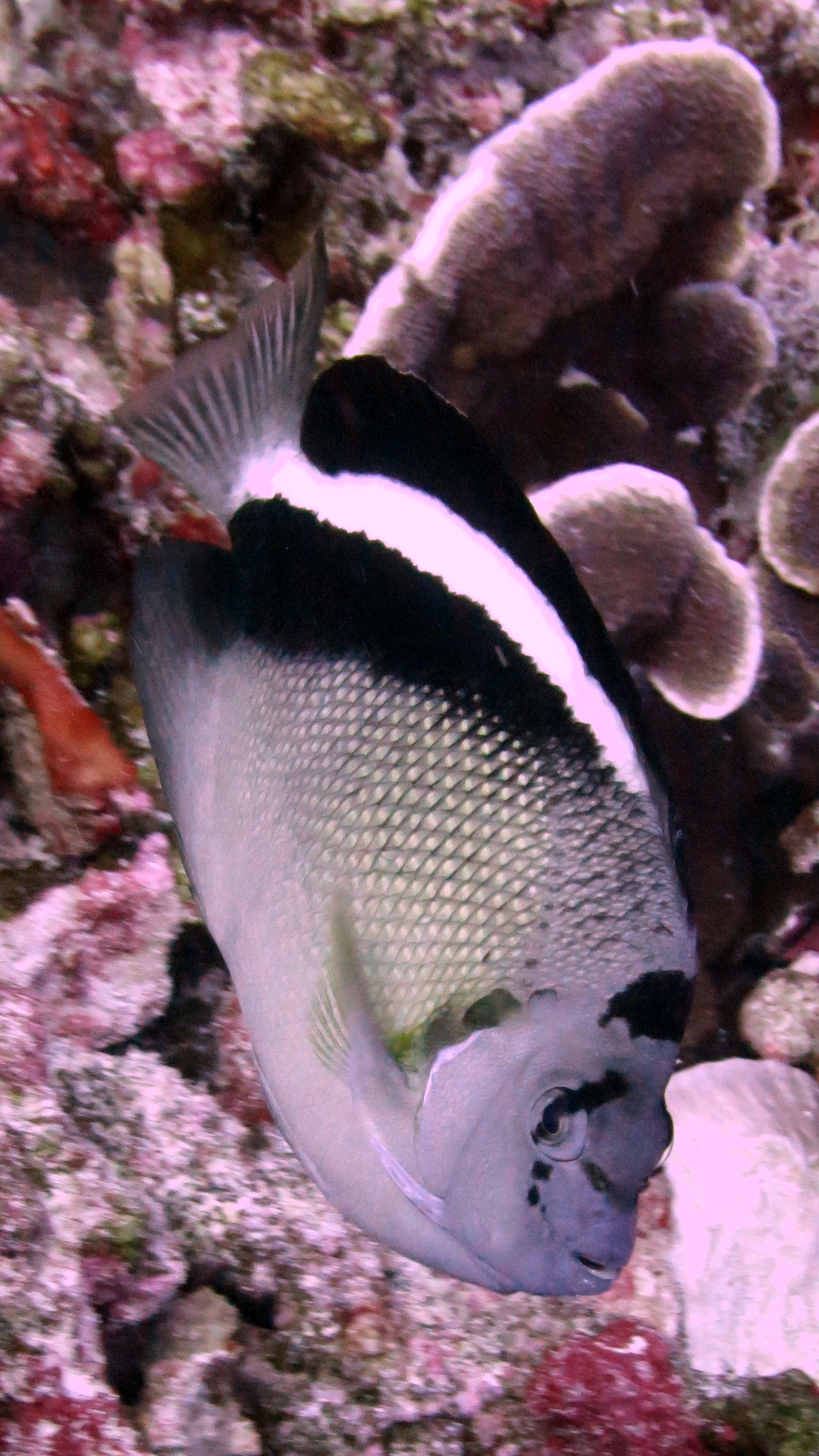

Conservation status
- Least Concern (IUCN 3.1)

Scientific classification
- Kingdom: Animalia
- Phylum: Chordata
- Class: Actinopterygii
- Order: Acanthuriformes
- Family: Pomacanthidae
- Genus: Apolemichthys
- Species: A. griffisi

Binomial name
- Apolemichthys griffisi (Carlson & L. R. Taylor, 1981)

Synonyms
- Holacanthus griffisi Carlson & Taylor, 1981

= Apolemichthys griffisi =

Species of fish

Apolemichthys griffisi, or Griffis angelfish, is a species of ray-finned fish, a marine angelfish belonging to the family Pomacanthidae. It is found in the Pacific Ocean. It is a rarity for the species to enter the aquarium trade.

== Description ==
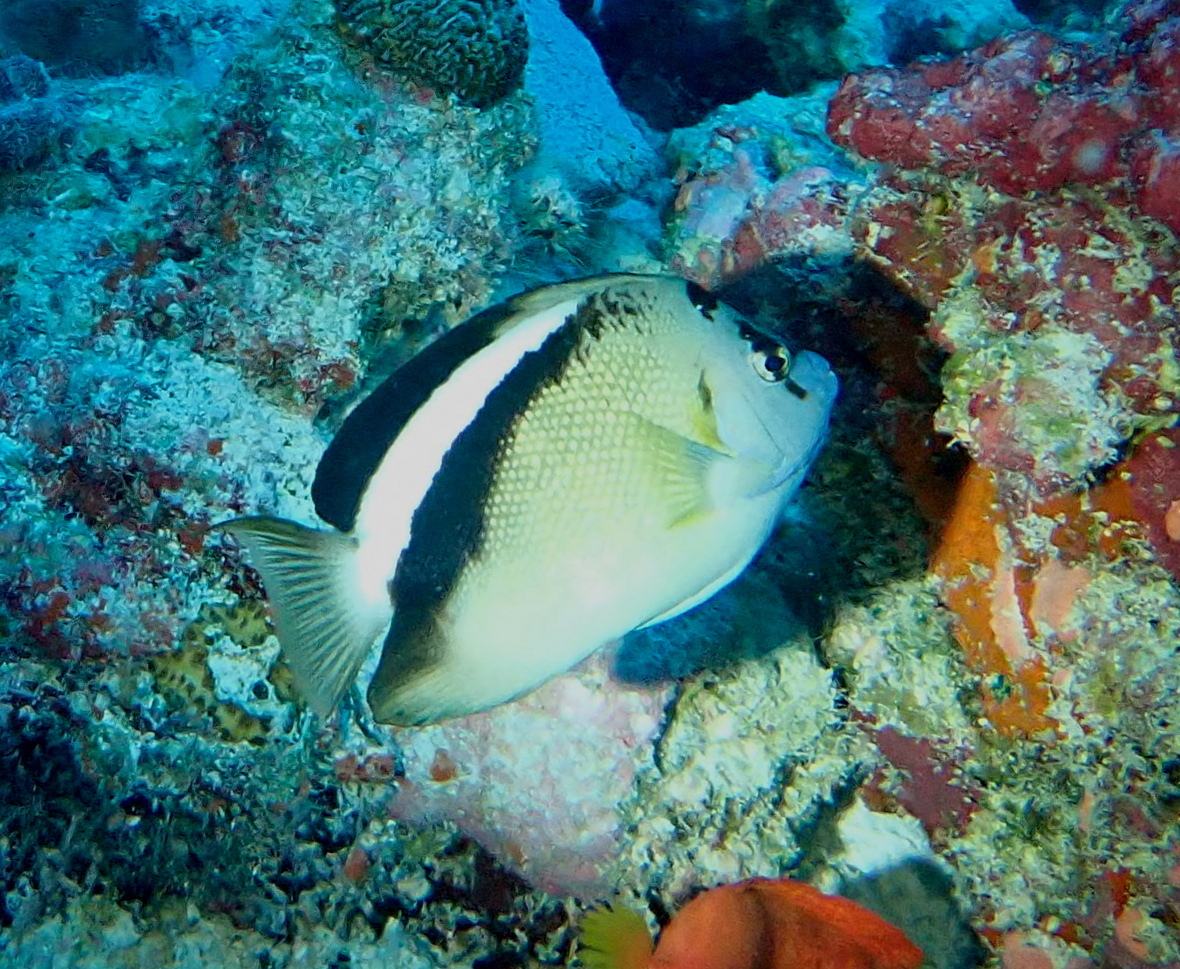
In Kiribati

Apolemichthys griffisi has a rather greyish white or ash coloured body with a wide. black band extending from the head as far as the ventral part of the caudal peduncle, within this lies a contrasting white band. There is a large black spot on the head above the eye. The dorsal fin is largely black and the anal and pelvic fins are white. The juveniles lack the white stripe within the black band. The dorsal fin contains 14 spines and 18 soft rays while the anal fin has 3 spines and 18 soft rays. This species attains a maximum total length of 30 centimetres (12 in).

== Distribution ==
Apolemichthys griffisi has a wide distribution which extends from Southeast Asia east to the Line Islands, where it has been recorded with certainty from Kiribati and maybe the US Islands. The distribution is known to include Indonesia, Kiribati, Nauru, the Solomon Islands and Papua New Guinea.

== Habitat & biology ==
Apolemichthys griffisi is a species of the outer coral reef slopes, rocky ledges and drop-offs. It is normally recorded as solitary individuals, pairs or in small aggregations. It is found at depths of 10 to 100 metres (33 to 328 ft). it feeds on benthic invertebrates such as sponges, tunicates and crustaceans. It is a protogynous hermaphrodite and there is no sexual dimorphism.

== Systematics ==
Apolemichthys griffisi Was first formally described in 1981 as Holacanthus griffisi by Bruce Carlson and Leigthon R. Taylor with the type locality given as Canton Island one of the northern Phoenix Islands in the South Pacific. Its specific name honours Nixon Griffis (1917–1993), a conservationist who was trustee of the New York Zoological Society and a patron of the New York Aquarium, and supported the Carlson and Taylor's collecting trip to Canton Island on which this species was discovered. Within the genus Apolemichthys this species seems to be more closely related to A. xanthotis and A. xanthurus of the Indian Ocean.

== Utilisation ==
Apolemichthys griffisi is apparently rare in the aquarium trade (is reported to be rarely exported through the aquarium trade). Most of the specimens in the trade are collected from Kiritimati, Kiribati. It is reported to be one of the most expensive fishes in the trade.

== Sources ==
- Helmut Debelius, Rudie H. Kuiter, World Atlas of Marine Fishes, Hollywood Import & Export, Inc., 2006
- Mark Allen, Roger Steene, Gerald R. Allen, A Guide to Angelfishes and Butterflyfishes, Odyssey Publishing. 1998
- Setup Brough, Clarice. Griffis Angelfish Animal-World. Online. Clarice Brough
