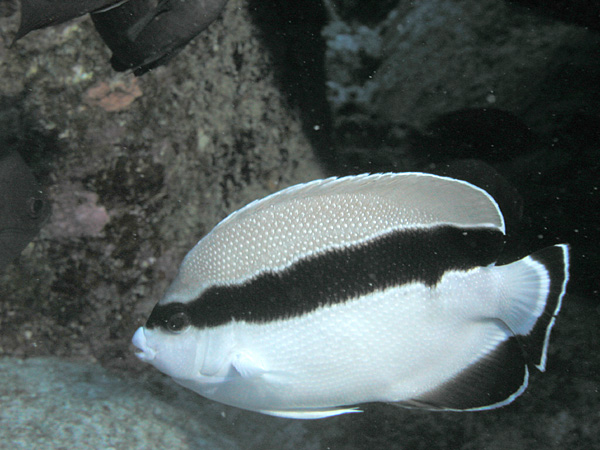
- Banded angelfish (Apolemichthys arcuatus )

Conservation status
- Least Concern (IUCN 3.1)

Scientific classification
- Kingdom: Animalia
- Phylum: Chordata
- Class: Actinopterygii
- Division: Teleostei
- Order: Acanthuriformes
- Family: Pomacanthidae
- Genus: Apolemichthys
- Species: A. arcuatus

Binomial name
- Apolemichthys arcuatus (Gray, 1831)

Synonyms
- Holacanthus arcuatus Gray, 1831; Desmoholacanthus arcuatus (Gray, 1831)

= Banded angelfish =

Species of fish

The banded angelfish (Apolemichthys arcuatus), also known as the bandit angelfish and three spine angelfish, is a distinctive species ray-finned fish belonging to the family Pomacanthidae. It is endemic to deeper reefs in Hawaii and the Johnston Atoll.

== Description ==
The banded angelfish has an overall a pale white coloured body which is marked with a wide black band with a white upper margin that starts immediately above the mouth and runs to the posterior part of the dorsal fin. Another similar black white edged submarginal band runs along the caudal and anal fins. The dorsal fin contains 13 spines and 17-18 soft rays while the anal fin has 3 spines and 18 soft rays. This species attains a maximum total length of 18 centimetres (7.1 in).

== Distribution ==
The banded angelfish is endemic to Hawaii and Johnston Atoll.

== Habitat and biology ==
The banded angelfish is a common species on rocky reefs, under overhangs and in caves, in areas of coral. Its diet is dominated by sponges but they also consume algae, hydroids and the eggs of marine organisms. They are found at depths of 10 to 183 metres (33 to 600 ft). Juveniles are found in deeper water.

== Systematics ==
The banded angelfish was first formally described as Holacanthus arcuatus in 1831 by the English naturalist John Edward Gray (1800–1875). Its specific name, arcuatus, means "bowed" or "arched", a reference to the "broad black arched band from the eye to the caudal end of the dorsal fin".

== Utilisation ==
The banded angelfish is rare in the aquarium trade and when available it is a difficult species to maintain in captivity.
