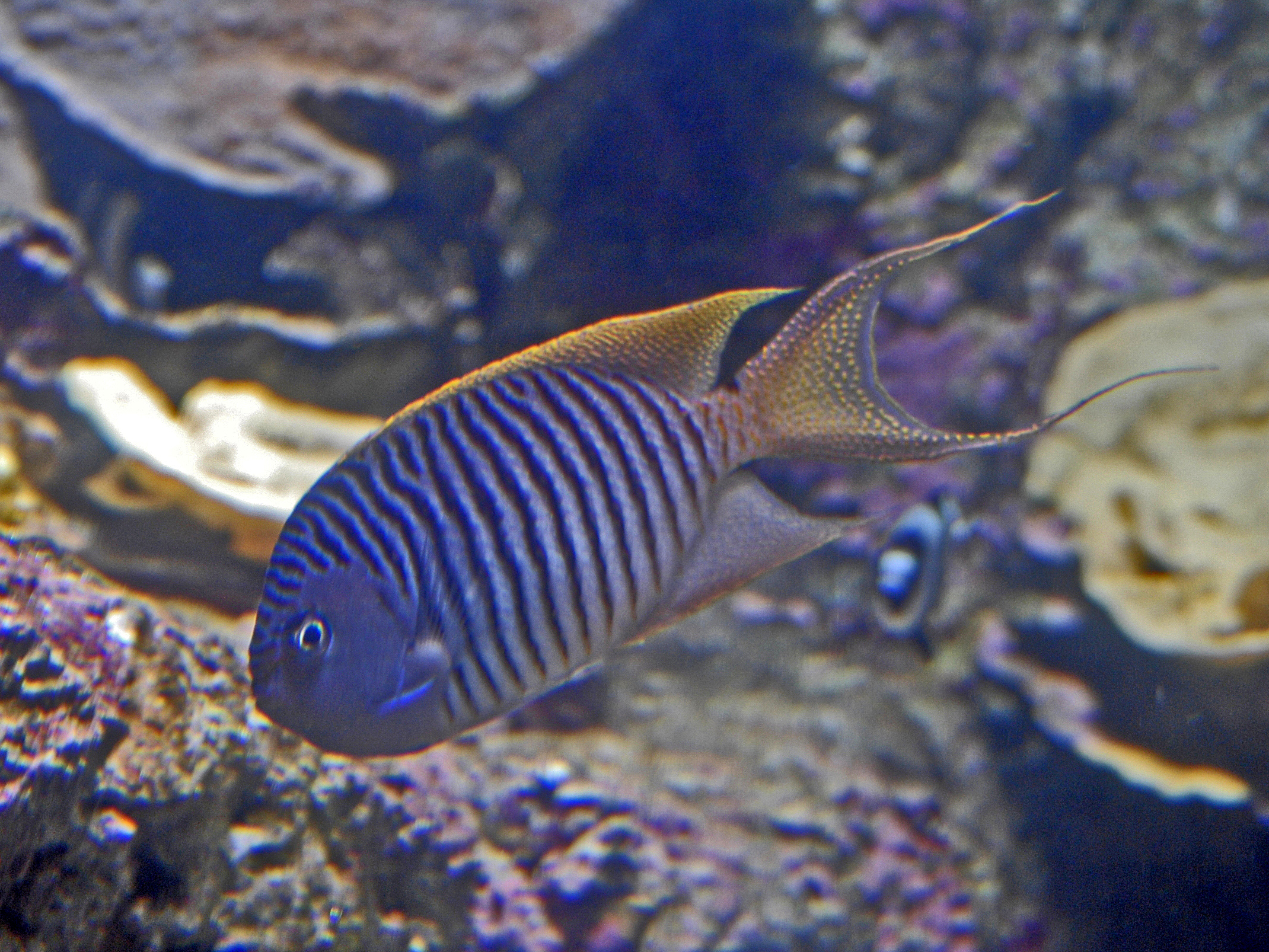
- Male
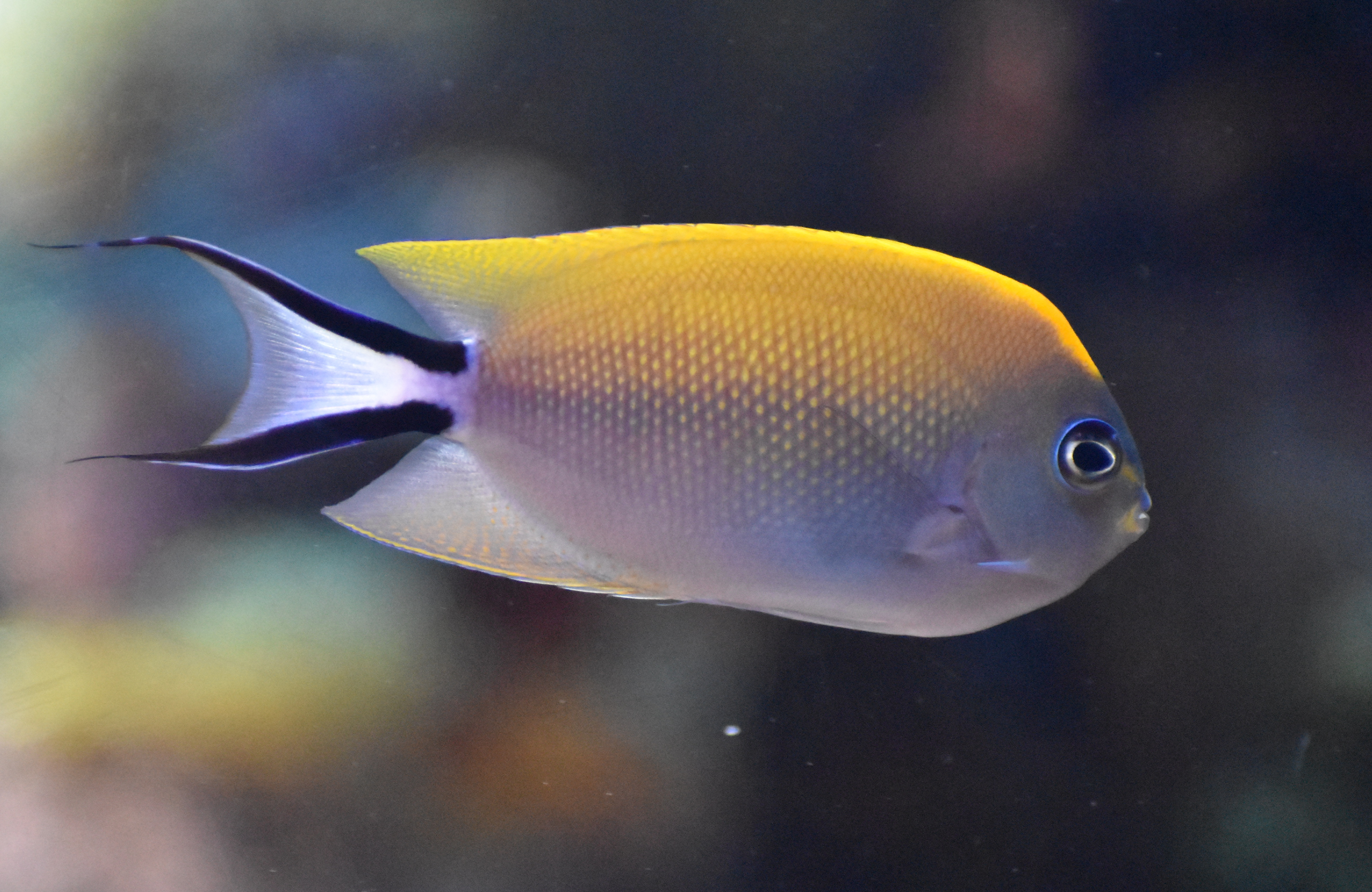
- Female

Conservation status
- Least Concern (IUCN 3.1)

Scientific classification
- Kingdom: Animalia
- Phylum: Chordata
- Class: Actinopterygii
- Order: Acanthuriformes
- Family: Pomacanthidae
- Genus: Genicanthus
- Species: G. melanospilos

Binomial name
- Genicanthus melanospilos (Bleeker, 1857)

Synonyms
- Holacanthus melanospilos Bleeker, 1857

= Genicanthus melanospilos =

Species of fish

Genicanthus melanospilos, the spotbreast angelfish, blackspot angelfish or swallowtail angelfish, the family Pomacanthidae. It occurs in the Indo-West Pacific region.

== Description ==
Genicanthus melanospilos shows sexual dichromatism, the males and females have differing colouration. The males have a background colour of bluish white on the body with many reddish black vertical stripes. Their dorsal, caudal and anal fins are marked with yellow spots and the caudal fin is light yellow with blue margins and has long filamentous lobes. They also have a sizeable black spot on the breast near the base of the pelvic fins. In the females the dorsal half of the body is yellow, while ventrally it is bluish white, and the tail is bluish with a black stripe along its lower and upper margins. In both sexes the forked tail narrows at its base to create a "swallow tail". The dorsal fin contains 15 spines and 15-17 soft rays while the anal fin has 3 spines and 17-18 soft rays. This species attains a maximum total length of 18 centimetres (7.1 in).

== Distribution ==
Genicanthus melanospilos is a widespread species which is found in the eastern Indian Ocean and the western Pacific Ocean. It is found throughout the Malay Archipelago into the southwestern Pacific Ocean as Far East as Fiji, north as far as the Ryukyu Islands south to Australia. In Australian waters it is found in the Indian Ocean of the Cocos (Keeling) Islands and Christmas Island, as well as the Ashmore Reef in the Timor Sea and the Great Barrier Reef off the coast of Cairns in Queensland .

== Habitat and biology ==
Genicanthus melanospilos is found at depths between 20 and 80 metres (66 and 262 ft). It occurs in areas rich in coral on the outer slopes of reefs and drop-offs. Adults are normally organised as small harems made up of a male and several females. They feed on zooplankton in the water over reefs. Like all other angelfish the spotbreast angelfish is a protogynous hermaphrodite, with all individuals being female initially and the dominant ones changing to males.

== Systematics ==
Genicanthus melanospilos was first formally described in 1857 as Holocanthus melanospilos by the Dutch ichthyologist and herpetologist Pieter Bleeker (1819–1878) with the type locality given as Ambon Island in Indonesia. The specific name is a compound of melanos meaning "black" and spills meaning "spot", referring to the black spot on the male's chest.

== Utilisation ==
Genicanthus melanospilos is common in the aquarium trade.
