= Apolemichthys guezei =

Conservation status
- Data Deficient (IUCN 3.1)

Scientific classification
- Kingdom: Animalia
- Phylum: Chordata
- Class: Actinopterygii
- Order: Acanthuriformes
- Family: Pomacanthidae
- Genus: Apolemichthys
- Species: A. guezei

Binomial name
- Apolemichthys guezei (Randall & Maugé, 1978)

Species of fish

Apolemichthys guezei, the Reunion angelfish, is a species of fish in the family Pomacanthidae, belonging to the genus Apolemichthys.

== Distribution ==
Apolemichthys guezei is native to the western Indian Ocean, where it is known only from the waters of Réunion.

== Conservation status ==
Under the IUCN Red List this species is listed as "Data Deficient".
