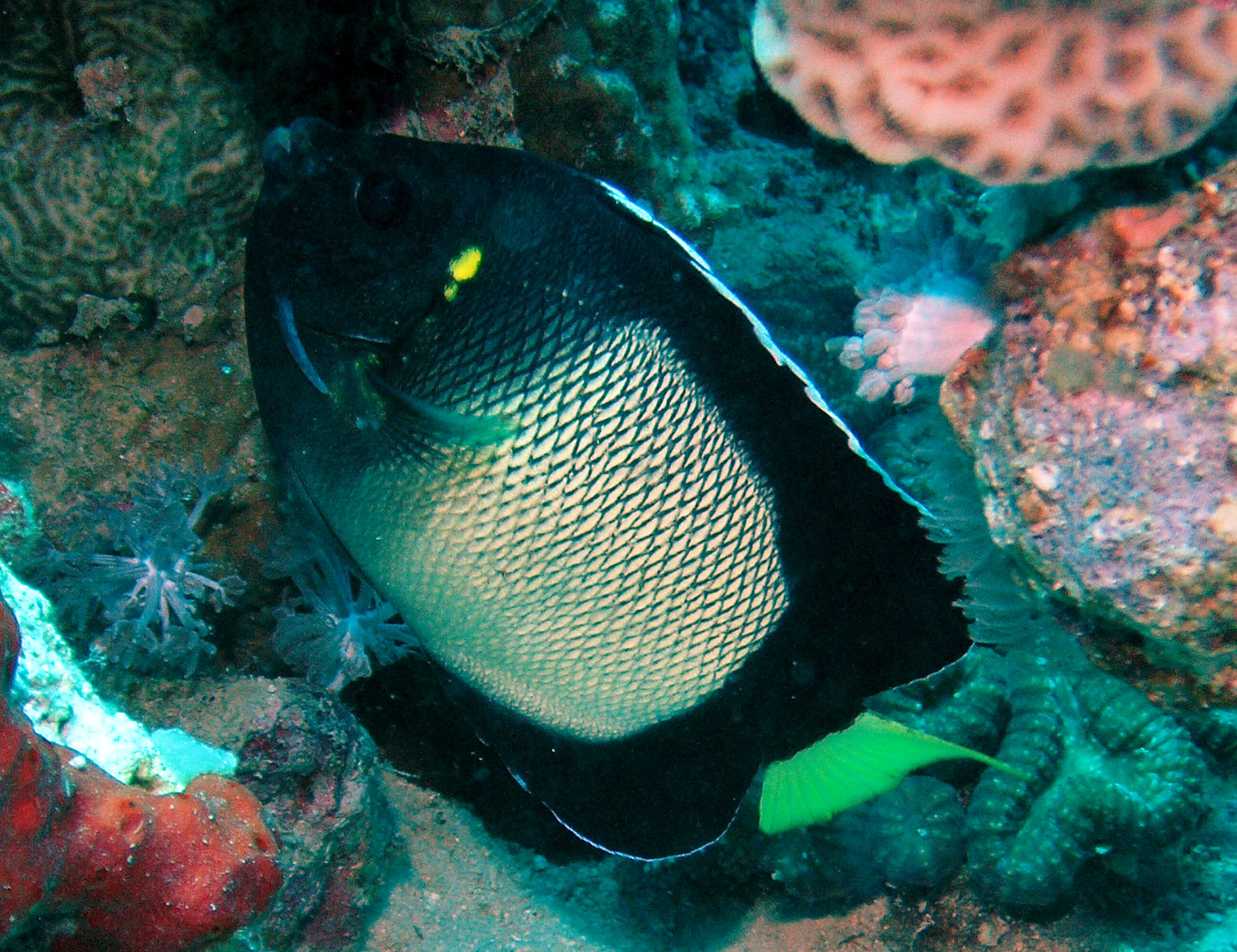

Conservation status
- Least Concern (IUCN 3.1)

Scientific classification
- Kingdom: Animalia
- Phylum: Chordata
- Class: Actinopterygii
- Order: Acanthuriformes
- Family: Pomacanthidae
- Genus: Apolemichthys
- Species: A. xanthotis

Binomial name
- Apolemichthys xanthotis (Fraser-Brunner, 1950)

Synonyms
- Holacanthus xanthotis Fraser-Brunner, 1950

= Apolemichthys xanthotis =

Species of fish

Apolemichthys xanthotis, the yellow-ear angelfish or Red Sea angelfish, is a species of marine ray-finned fish, a marine angelfish belonging to the family Pomacanthidae.

== Description ==
Apolemichthys xanthotis has a largely white coloured body with a black head, a yellow tail. The dorsal and anal fins are black with white margins. The black on the head is more extensive than in the closely related Apolemichthys xanthotis extending across the Gill cover and over the first few scale rows on the body. This contrasts with the yellow spot on the upper preoperculum. The juveniles have a wide black band running over the eye and an oblique are of black on the back, this patch fades as the fish matures. This species attains a maximum total length of 20 centimetres (7.9 in).

== Distribution ==
Apolemichthys xanthotis is found in the northwestern Indian Ocean in the Red Sea, Gulf of Aden, the Arabian Sea and the Persian Gulf. It is also found off Socotra and a transient population was discovered off Kenya following the El Nino of 1998.

== Habitat and biology ==
Apolemichthys xanthotis lives at depths between 10 and 80 metres (33 and 262 ft) in areas that are rich in coral, as well as on rocky reefs. It is typically encountered in pairs or small groups and probably feeds on algae and benthic invertebrates, especially sponges.

== Systematics ==
Apolemichthys xanthotis was first formally described in 1950 as Holacanthus xanthotis by the British ichthyologist Alec Fraser-Bruner (1906–1986) with the type locality given as Al-Mukalla on the Red Sea coast of Yemen. Its specific name xanthotis means "yellow ear" and refers to the yellow spot on the upper preoperculum. Within the genus Apolemichthys this species seems to be more closely related to A. griffisi of the Western Pacific Ocean and the allopatric A. xanthurus of the Indian Ocean.

== Utilisation ==
Apolemichthys xanthotis is uncommon in the aquarium trade. This is despite being considered to be a beautiful, hardy and easily maintained species.
