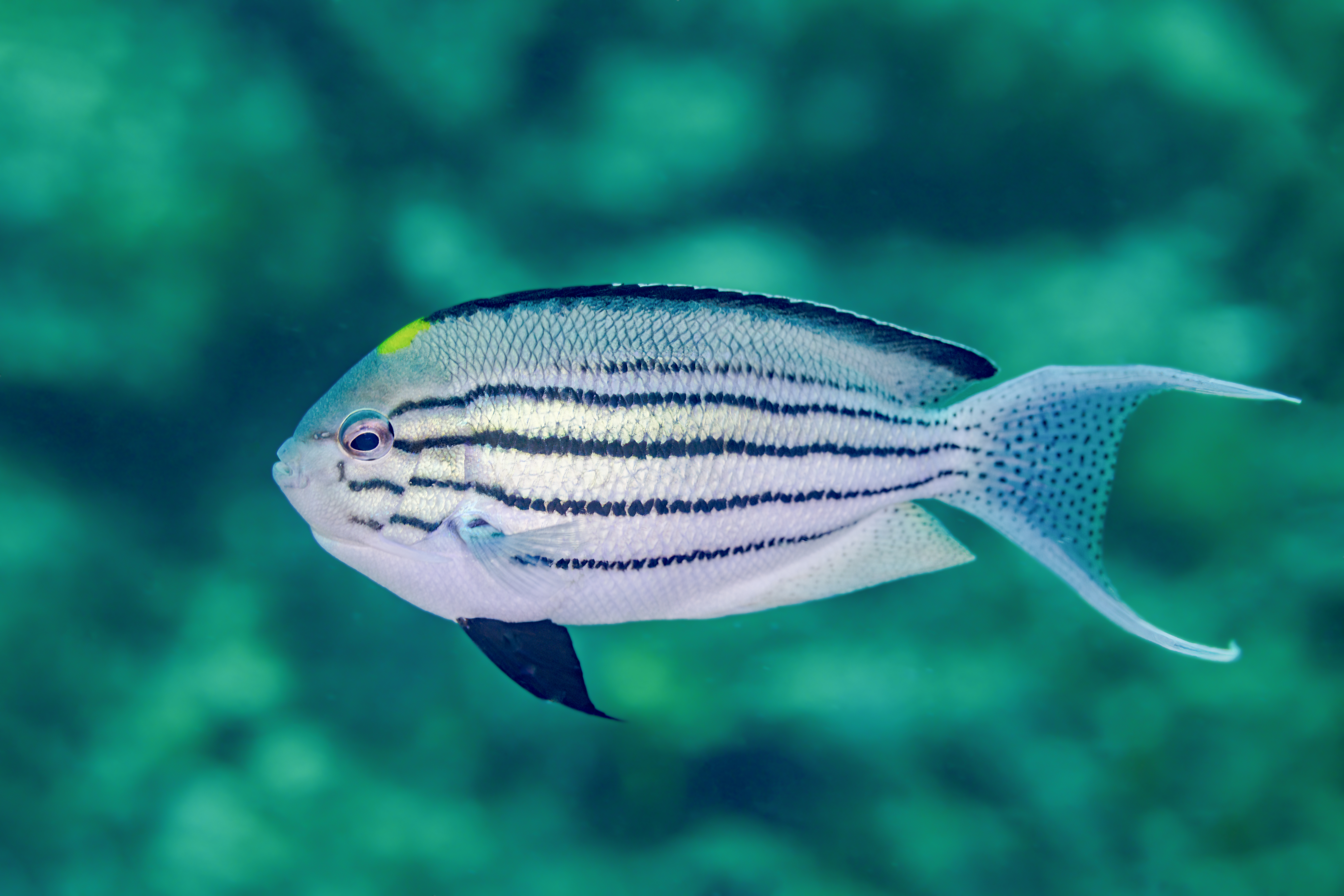
- In Anilao, Philippines

Conservation status
- Least Concern (IUCN 3.1)

Scientific classification
- Kingdom: Animalia
- Phylum: Chordata
- Class: Actinopterygii
- Division: Teleostei
- Order: Acanthuriformes
- Family: Pomacanthidae
- Genus: Genicanthus
- Species: G. lamarck

Binomial name
- Genicanthus lamarck (Lacépède, 1802)

Synonyms
- Holacanthus lamarck Lacépède, 1802

= Genicanthus lamarck =

Species of fish

Genicanthus lamarck, the blackstriped angelfish or Lamarck's angelfish, is a species of marine ray-finned fish, a marine angelfish belonging to the family Pomacanthidae. It occurs in the Indo-West Pacific region.

== Description ==
Genicanthus lamarck adults are pale greyish to whitish in colour marked with 4-5 irregular black undulating stripes which radiate out from the eye and run horizontally along the flanks. There is a wide black submarginal band on the dorsal fin, and the caudal fin is finely spotted. The topmost stripe is wider in the females and in the juveniles. The males have a yellow patch on the crown, black pelvic fins, and very elongated lobes on the caudal fin. In addition the males have black pelvic fins and white lobes to the caudal fin while females have white pectoral fins and black caudal fin lobes. The dorsal fin contains 15 spines and 15-16 soft rays while the anal fin has 3 spines and 16-17soft rays. This species attains a maximum total length of 25 centimetres (9.8 in).

== Distribution ==
Genicanthus lamarck is found from the Gulf of Thailand east through the Malayan Archipelago to the Solomon Islands, north as far as southern Japan and south to the Great Barrier Reef. Its Australian distribution also includes Ashmore Reef and Cartier Island in the Timor Sea.

== Habitat and biology ==
Genicanthus lamarck is found at depths between 10 and 50 metres (33 and 164 ft). It is found in areas of dense coral growth on the seaward slopes of reefs and on steep drop-offs. Its normal diet is zooplankton. They are normally observed over the bottom in small harems with a dominant male and 2-6 females. They are sequential protogynous hermaphrodites and if the male in a harem goes missing the dominant female changes sex to become male.

== Systematics ==
Genicanthus lamarck was first formally described in 1860 as Holocanthus caudovittatus by the French naturalist Bernard Germain de Lacépède (1756-1825) with no type locality given. The specific name honours the French naturalist Jean-Baptiste Pierre Antoine de Monet, Chevalier de Lamarck (1744-1829). This species is known to hybridise with the ornate angelfish (Genicanthus bellus).

== Utilisation ==
Genicanthus lamarck is frequently found in the aquarium trade. It is also regarded as a delicacy in the Moluccas.
