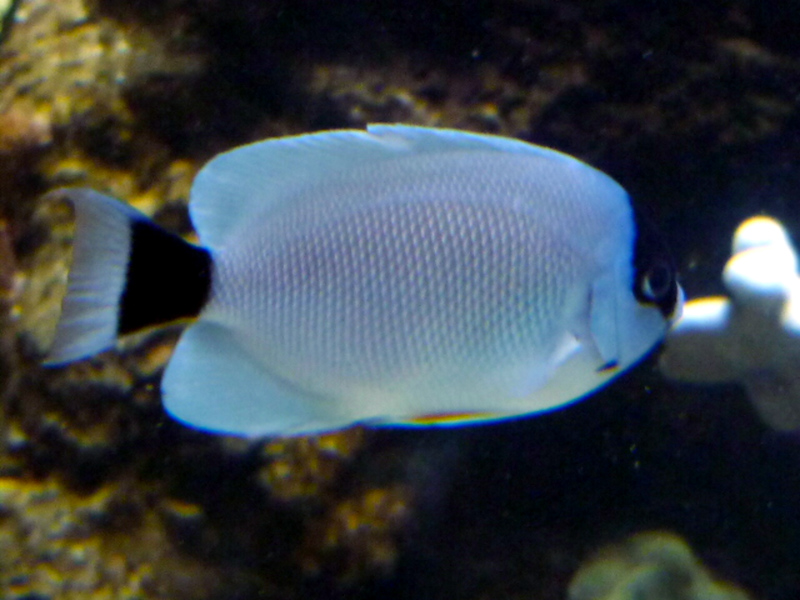

Conservation status
- Least Concern (IUCN 3.1)

Scientific classification
- Kingdom: Animalia
- Phylum: Chordata
- Class: Actinopterygii
- Order: Acanthuriformes
- Family: Pomacanthidae
- Genus: Genicanthus
- Species: G. personatus

Binomial name
- Genicanthus personatus Randall, 1975

= Genicanthus personatus =

Species of fish

Genicanthus personatus the masked angelfish, is a species of marine ray-finned fish, a marine angelfish belonging to the family Pomacanthidae. It is endemic to Hawaii.

== Description ==
Genicanthus personatus is largely a brilliant white colour at all ages. The juveniles have an area of black colour which covers most of the head. As the fish grows this breaks up starting with the lips which turn bluish white and their caudal fins begin to darken to become black. This species, like all marine angelfish, is a sequential protogynous hermaphrodite and the younger sexually mature adults are all females. The black on the head reduces in extent. The black eventually only surrounds the eyes, is on the chin and along the edge of the operculum and its operculum spine. They also have yellow pelvic fins. Once they reach a length of 15 to 18 centimetres (5.9 to 7.1 in) they may change sex to males. When they do so, they develop a vivid orange yellow pigmentation on the pectoral fins and on the whole face as well as on the margins of its dorsal, anal and pelvic fins. The males develop long filamentous extensions to the caudal fin lobes. This species attains a maximum total length of 21 centimetres (8.3 in).

== Distribution ==
Genicanthus personatus is endemic to the Hawaiian Islands, here it is more numerous in the northwestern islands.

== Habitat and biology ==
Genicanthus personatus is found at depths between 10 and 150 metres (33 and 492 ft) where it occurs over rocky reefs and on the outer slopes of reefs. The diet of this species comprises green algae in the genus Codium as well as planktonic organisms and the eggs of fishes. Like all other angelfish the masked angelfish is a protogynous hermaphrodite, with all individuals being female initially and the dominant ones changing to males.

== Systematics ==
Genicanthus personatus was first formally described in 1975 by the American ichthyologist John Ernest Randall (1924–2020) with the type locality given as Honolulu on Oahu. The specific name personatus means "masked".

== Utilisation ==
Genicanthus personatus is very rare in the aquarium traded down commands high prices. It has been bred in captivity.
