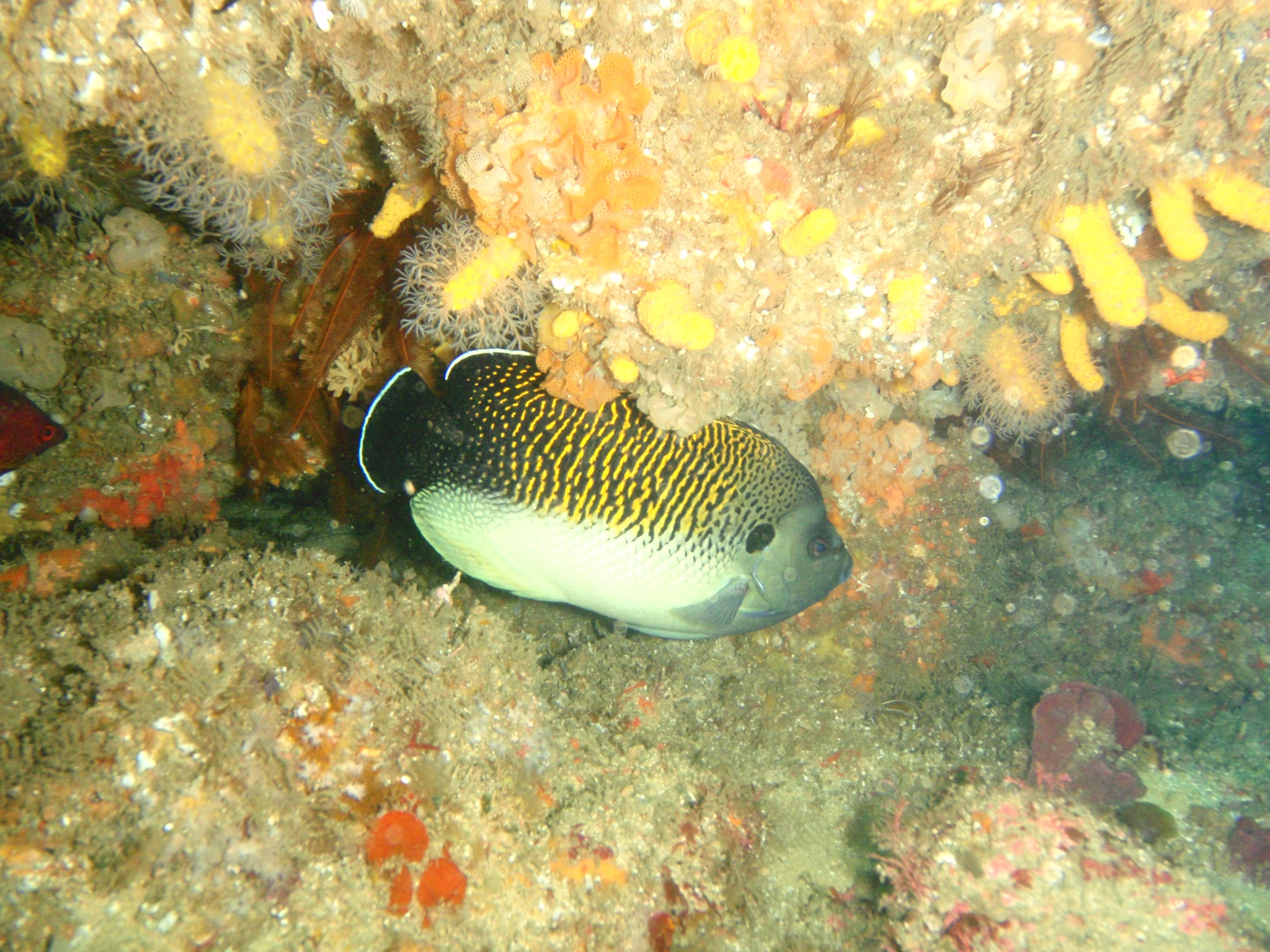

Conservation status
- Least Concern (IUCN 3.1)

Scientific classification
- Kingdom: Animalia
- Phylum: Chordata
- Class: Actinopterygii
- Order: Acanthuriformes
- Family: Pomacanthidae
- Genus: Apolemichthys
- Species: A. kingi

Binomial name
- Apolemichthys kingi (Heemstra, 1984)

= Apolemichthys kingi =

Species of fish

Apolemichthys kingi, also known as the tiger angelfish, is a species of fish in the family Pomacanthidae, belonging to the genus Apolemichthys.

== Distribution ==
Apolemichthys kingi is native to the western Indian Ocean, where it can be found off the coasts of South Africa and Mozambique.

== Conservation status ==
The IUCN Red List lists this species as "Least Concern".
