= Pitcairn angelfish =

Conservation status
- Least Concern (IUCN 3.1)

Scientific classification
- Kingdom: Animalia
- Phylum: Chordata
- Class: Actinopterygii
- Order: Acanthuriformes
- Family: Pomacanthidae
- Genus: Genicanthus
- Species: G. spinus

Binomial name
- Genicanthus spinus Randall, 1975

Species of marine ray-finned fish

The Pitcairn angelfish (Genicanthus spinus) is a species of marine ray-finned fish, a marine angelfish belonging to the family Pomacanthidae. It is found in the southwestern Pacific Ocean.

== Description ==
The Pitcairn angelfish like the other angelfishes in the genus Genicanthus, shows sexual dichromatism, the males and females show differences in colour and pattern. The males have a white body which is marked with many vertical black stripes while the females have an overall bluish white colouration. In both sexes the forked tail narrows at its base to create a "swallow tail". The dorsal fin contains 15 spines and 17 soft rays while the anal fin has 3 spines and 18-19 soft rays. This species attains a maximum total length of 35 centimetres (14 in).

== Distribution ==
Genicanthus spinus is found in the southwestern Pacific Ocean. It has been recorded from the islands of Raivavae and Rurutu in the Austral Islands of French Polynesia Dulcie Atoll in the UK Overseas Territory of the Pitcairn Islands and Rarotonga in the Cook Islands.

== Habitat and biology ==
Genicanthus spinus Is found on rock and coral reefs at depths between 30 and 60 metres (98 and 197 ft) (at least). it is normally encountered in groups that swim high in the water column, these are harems of 1 male and as many as 4 females. They feed mostly on zooplankton but may eat some benthic invertebrates.

== Systematics ==
Genicanthus spinus was first formally described in 1975 by the American ichthyologists John E. Randall (1924–2020) with the type locality given as Bounty Bay on Pitcairn Island. The specific name spinus means "spine" and refers to the very large anterior spine in front of the eye.
