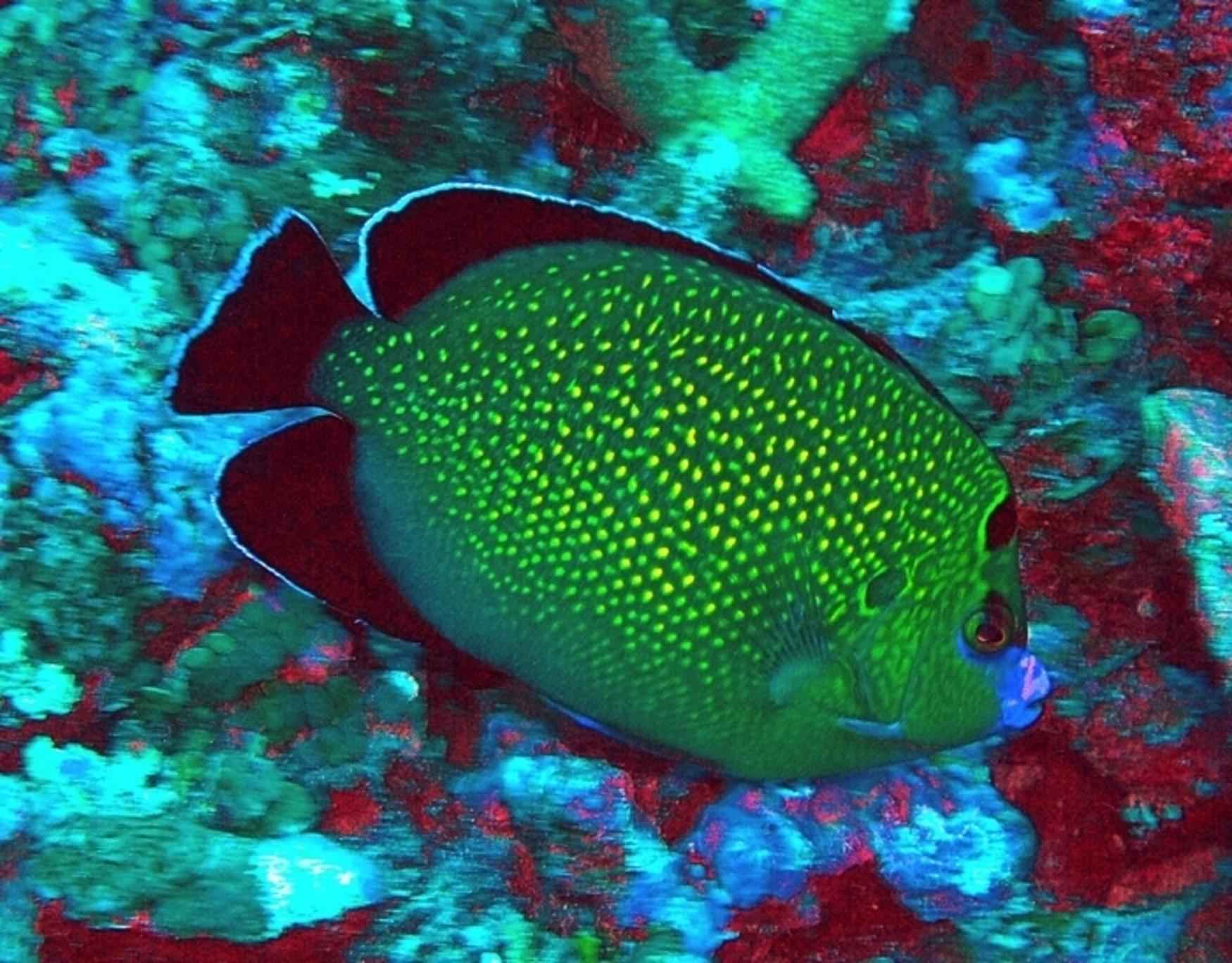

Conservation status
- Least Concern (IUCN 3.1)

Scientific classification
- Kingdom: Animalia
- Phylum: Chordata
- Class: Actinopterygii
- Order: Acanthuriformes
- Family: Pomacanthidae
- Genus: Apolemichthys
- Species: A. xanthopunctatus

Binomial name
- Apolemichthys xanthopunctatus (Burgess, 1973)

= Apolemichthys xanthopunctatus =

Species of fish

Apolemichthys xanthopunctatus, the goldspotted angelfish, is a species of fish in the family Pomacanthidae, belonging to the genus Apolemichthys.

== Distribution ==
Apolemichthys xanthopunctatus is native to the Pacific Ocean, where it can be found from the Gilbert Islands to the Line Islands.

== Conservation status ==
The IUCN Red List list this species as "Least Concern".
