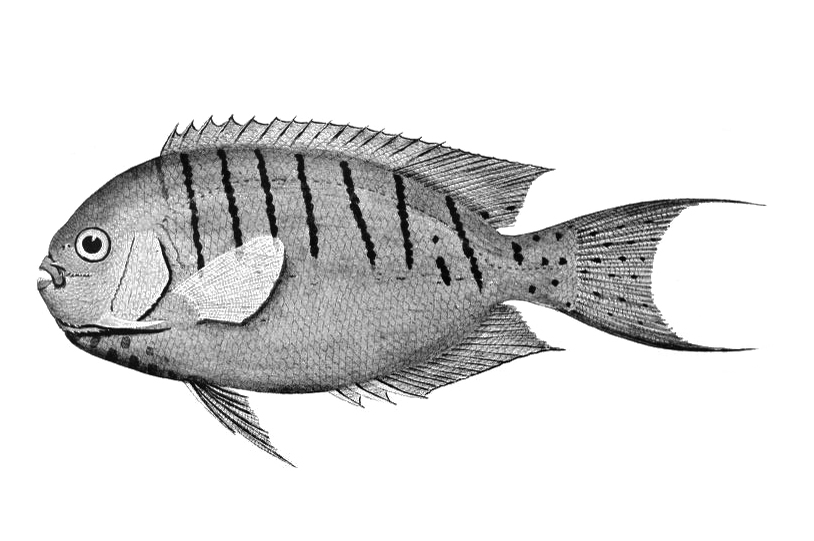

Conservation status
- Least Concern (IUCN 3.1)

Scientific classification
- Kingdom: Animalia
- Phylum: Chordata
- Class: Actinopterygii
- Order: Acanthuriformes
- Family: Pomacanthidae
- Genus: Genicanthus
- Species: G. semicinctus

Binomial name
- Genicanthus semicinctus (Waite, 1900)

Synonyms
- Holocanthus semicinctus Waite, 1900

= Halfbanded angelfish =

Species of fish

The halfbanded angelfish (Genicanthus semicinctus) is a species of marine ray-finned fish, a marine angelfish belonging to the family Pomacanthidae. It is found in the southwestern Pacific Ocean.

== Description ==
Genicanthus semicinctus like the other angelfishes in the genus Genicanthus, shows sexual dichromatism, the males and females show differences in colour and pattern. The males are marked with thin close-set wavy black, vertical bars which run from the back to two-thirds down the flanks with the lower third of the body being yellowish-orange. They have a yellow dorsal fin and yellow lobes with long filaments on the caudal fin which has black spots. The chest also has black spots. The females are plain dark grey on the back with a whitish abdomen and have dark lobes to the caudal fin. Their fins have thin blue margins and there is a black blotch above the eye, this has a vivid blue margin. The dorsal fin contains 15 spines and 15-16 soft rays while the anal fin has 3 spines and 17 soft rays. This species attains a maximum total length of 21 centimetres (8.3 in).

== Distribution ==
Genicanthus semicinctus is found in the southwestern Pacific Ocean. Here it is found only around Lord Howe Island, an Australian territory in the Tasman Sea, and the New Zealand outlying islands of the Kermadec Islands.

== Habitat and biology ==
Genicanthus semicinctus is found at depths between 10 and 100 metres (33 and 328 ft). it is found on the deep outer slopes of coral and rocky reefs. It normally occurs in small groups, harems of a male and as many as 4 females. This species is a protogynous hermaphrodite and if the male in a group disappears the dominant female will change into a male, this change takes a few weeks.

== Systematics ==
Genicanthus semicinctus was first formally described as Holocanthus semicinctus in 1900 by the British-born Australian ichthyologist Edgar Ravenswood Waite (1866–1928) with the type locality given as Lord Howe Island. The specific name is a compound of semi meaning "half" and cinctus meaning "bands".

== Utilisation ==
Genicanthus semicinctus is very rare in the aquarium trade.
