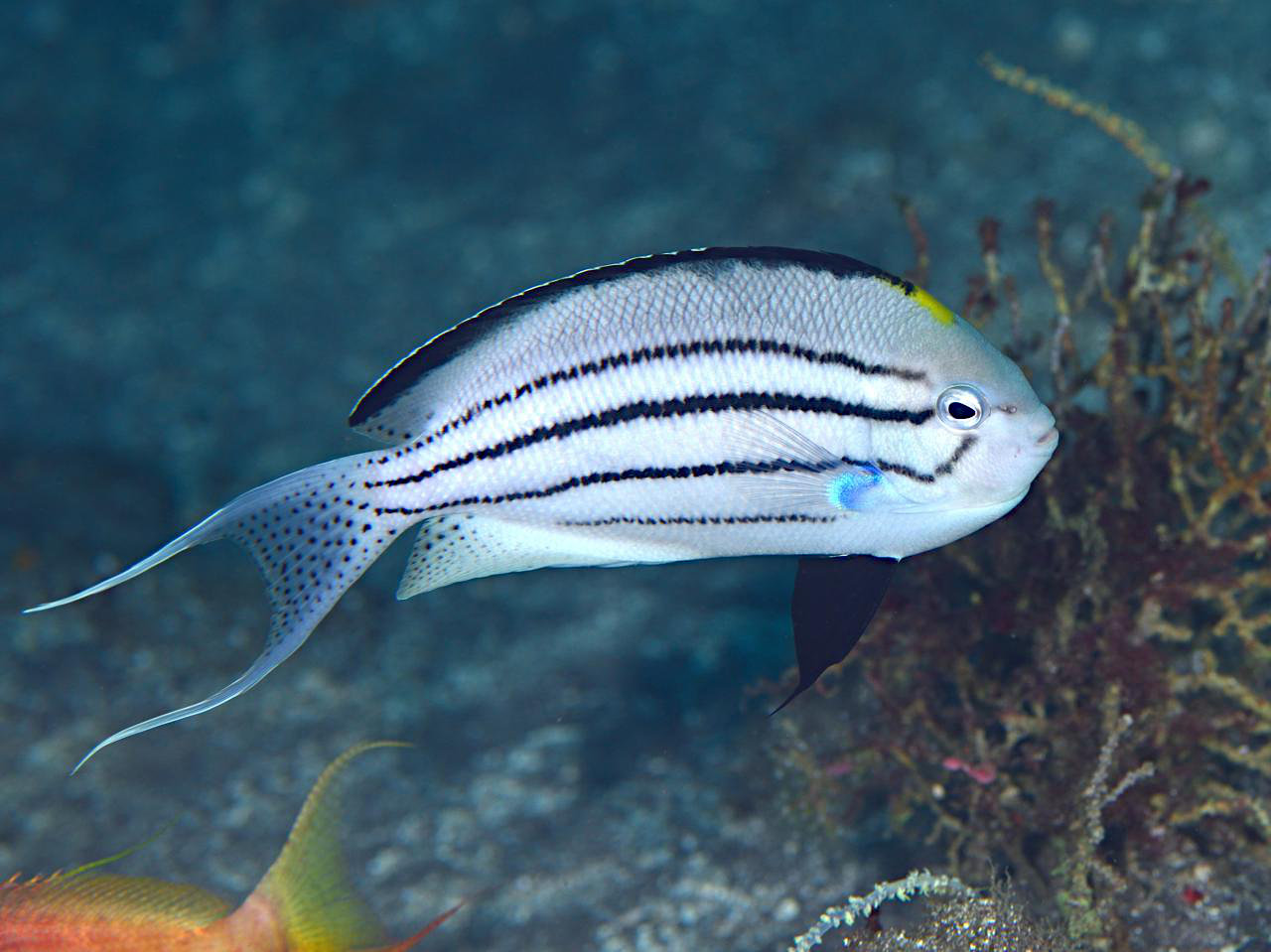
- Blackstriped angelfish (G. lamarck)

Scientific classification
- Kingdom: Animalia
- Phylum: Chordata
- Class: Actinopterygii
- Division: Teleostei
- Order: Acanthuriformes
- Family: Pomacanthidae
- Genus: Genicanthus; Swainson, 1839

Type species
- Holacanthus lamarck Lacépède, 1802

Species
- See text.

= Genicanthus =

Genus of fishes

Genicanthus is a genus of marine angelfishes in the family Pomacanthidae. Known commonly as swallowtail or lyretail angelfish, these fishes are so-named for the distinctive shape of their tailfins.

== In aquaria ==
This genus of angelfishes, in comparison to the other species found in hobby aquaria, are a good choice for beginners as they do not get nearly as large as some of the others. Another unique attribute is that swallowtail angels will tolerate each other and can be kept in pairs or as a single male with a harem, though it is typically best to add them to a tank at the same time. If added on by one, the angel which is added first may become aggressively territorial towards any new additions. Unlike others in the family Pomocanthidae, the angelfish species in the genus Genicanthus are generally considered to be reef safe.

Also unlike most other members of the Pomacanthidae, those in Genicanthus are sexually dimorphic, meaning males and females are easily distinguishable. Fish in this species possess a small mouth relative to its size. This small mouth is well adapted for feeding on plankton in the water column. As planktivores, members of Genicanthus generally will not nip corals and sessile invertebrates.

== Etymology ==
The name of this genus means “thorn cheek”, a reference to the spines on the rear margin of the operculum, a feature common to all angelfish.

== Species ==
The following species are classified under the genus Genicanthus:

| Male | Female | Scientific name | Common name | Distribution |
|---|---|---|---|---|
| | | Genicanthus bellus Randall, 1975. | Ornate angelfish | western Pacific and eastern Indian Ocean |
| | | Genicanthus caudovittatus (Günther, 1860). | Zebra angelfish | waters of Madagascar, the Maldives, Mauritius and Réunion and is also known in Weh Island |
| | | Genicanthus lamarck (Lacépède, 1802). | Blackstriped angelfish, Lamarck's angelfish | tropical waters of the Indo-West Pacific |
| | | Genicanthus melanospilos (Bleeker, 1857). | Spotbreast angelfish | Indo-Malayan region to the southwestern Pacific Ocean, and from the Ryukyu Islands to New Caledonia and Fiji. |
| | | Genicanthus personatus Randall, 1975. | Masked angelfish | the Hawaiian Islands |
| | | Genicanthus semicinctus (Waite, 1900). | Halfbanded angelfish | from Lord Howe Island (Australia), and the Kermadec Islands (New Zealand) in the south-western Pacific Ocean |
| | | Genicanthus semifasciatus (Kamohara, 1934) | Japanese swallow | Western Pacific |
| | | Genicanthus spinus Randall, 1975. | Pitcairn angelfish | Eastern Pacific: Cook Islands to Ducie Atoll |
| | | Genicanthus takeuchii Pyle, 1997. | Spotted angelfish | Northwest Pacific: Marcus Island and the Ogasawara Islands |
| | | Genicanthus watanabei (Yasuda & Tominaga, 1970). | Blackedged angelfish | West-central Pacific: Taiwan to the Tuamotu Islands, north to Ryukyu Island, south to New Caledonia and the Austral Islands; Marianas and Marshalls in Micronesia. |
