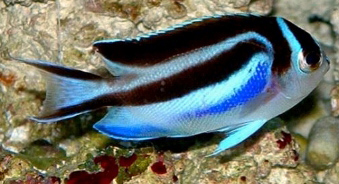
- Female
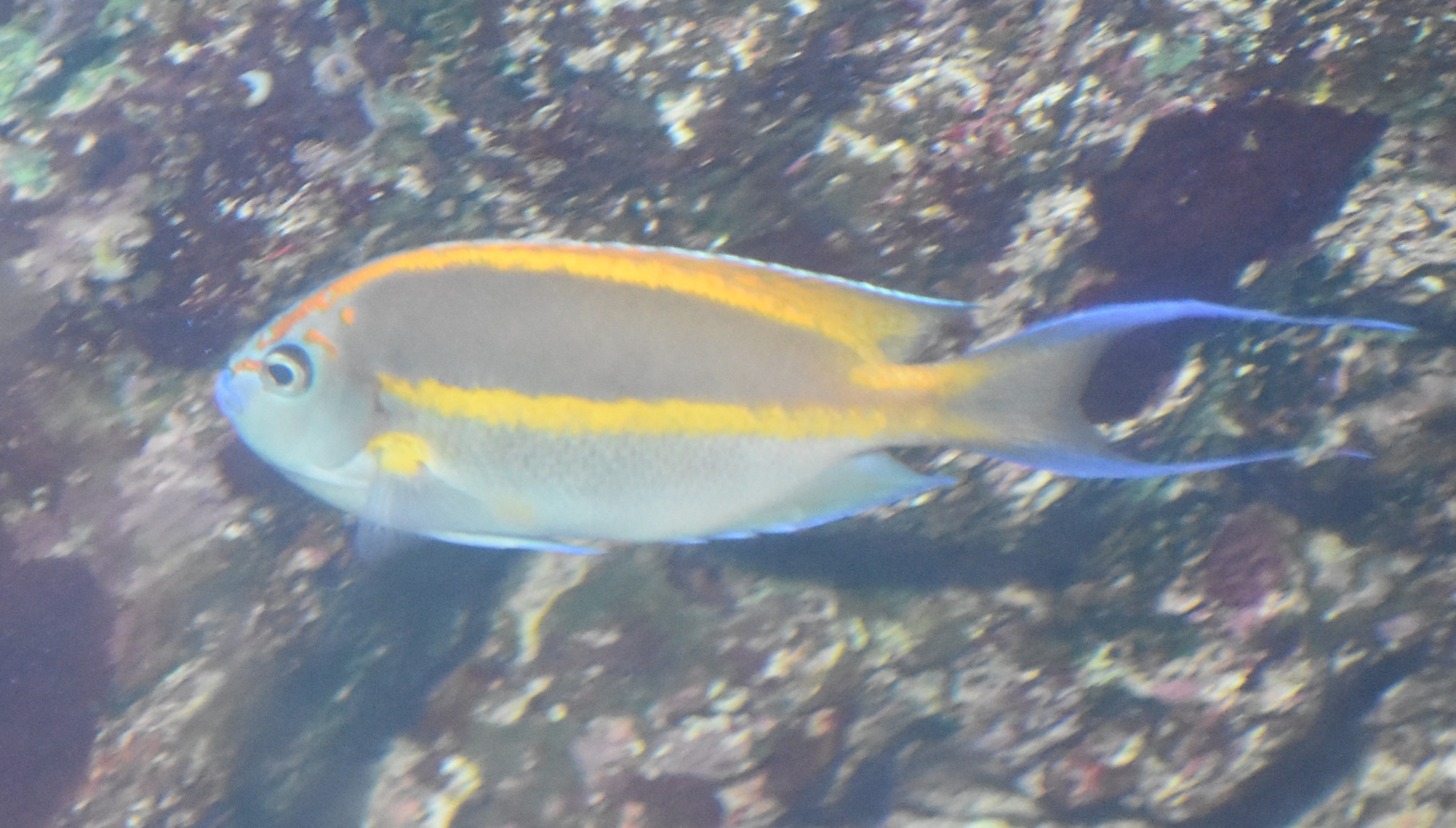
- Male

Conservation status
- Least Concern (IUCN 3.1)

Scientific classification
- Kingdom: Animalia
- Phylum: Chordata
- Class: Actinopterygii
- Division: Teleostei
- Order: Acanthuriformes
- Family: Pomacanthidae
- Genus: Genicanthus
- Species: G. bellus

Binomial name
- Genicanthus bellus Randall, 1975

= Genicanthus bellus =

Species of fish

Genicanthus bellus, the ornate angelfish, bellus angelfish or bellus lyretail angelfish, is a species of marine ray-finned fish, a marine angelfish belonging to the family Pomacanthidae. It is found in the Indo-Pacific region.

== Description ==
Genicanthus bellus Is sexually dichromatic, the males and females show different colouration and patterning. The females, and the juveniles, have greyish to bluish background colouration and are marked with wide black bands and a blue longitudinal stripe on the lower flanks. The males' background colour is pale bluish to greyish and they have horizontal golden stripes along the centre of the flanks and another along the lower back. Also in the males the bases of the pectoral and dorsal fins are the same colour as the stripes on the body. The caudal fin are unpigmented frequently marked with patches of orange, these have filamentous extensions and are bright blue. The lips are also bright blue. In the females and juveniles there is a black stripe which runs vertically from the nape through and engulfing the eye but does not extend past the lower part of the orbit. A second black stripe begins immediately to the rear of the first, creating a right angle at the origin of the dorsal fin and the continuing along that fins base. Another black stripe commences at the right angle of the second stripe and runs diagonally downward to the lower lobe of the caudal fin. The last black stripe runs along the upper margin of the upper lobe of the dorsal fin, starting at the caudal peduncle. Each of these four stripes has margins of white or very pale blue. The colour of the anal fin varies and it may have either a double or single orange stripe at the margin, however, this stripe can also be absent. is rather variable, and is edged either with a single or double stripe in orange. The dorsal fin is normally largely black, but in the largest and oldest females this fin may show variable shades of r. There are two silvery-white dots on the black upper lips of the females too. The dorsal fin contains 15 spines and 15–16 soft rays while the anal fin has 3 spines and 16–17 soft rays. This species attains a maximum total length of 18 centimetres (7.1 in).

== Distribution ==
Genicanthus bellus has a wide but localised distribution in the western Pacific Ocean and eastern Indian Ocean. In the Pacific it has been recorded from Tahiti, Guam, Palau, Tonga, the Cook Islands, the Marshall Islands, the Philippines, southern Japan and southern Indonesia. Its preference for quite deep water may mean that this species is under-recorded. In Australian waters, it is found in the Indian Ocean of the Cocos (Keeling) Islands and Christmas Island, as well as Holmes Reef in the Coral Sea.

== Habitat and biology ==
Genicanthus bellus is found at depths between 25 and 100 metres (82 and 328 ft). Here it lives on deep reefs, frequently in areas which are swept by strong currents on the outer drop-offs. It is a sociable species which lives in schools, within these there are harems of 3–7 fish, although the mating system has been described as being more like lekking. All angelfish are sequential protogynous hermaphrodites, all newly adult fish are female but the dominant females can increase the production of testosterone in the absence of a male and change sex to male in as short a time as a fortnight. They feed mainly on plankton, forming shoals in midwater to feed. This species will also feed on benthic invertebrates like polychaetes and bryozoans, as well as algae.

== Systematics ==
Genicanthus bellus was first formally described in 1979 by the American ichthyologist John Ernest Randall (1924–2020) with the type locality given as "Outside barrier reef off District of Paea, Tahiti, Society Islands, depth 60 m." The specific name bellus means "beautiful". The ornate angelfish is only known to hybridise with the blackstriped angelfish (Genicanthus lamarck).

== Utilisation ==
Genicanthus bellus is very infrequent and fetches high prices in the aquarium trade as it is rarely collected because of the depths at which it lives. It is some times more numerous in the trade when collecting effort is increased. There can be high mortality in specimens collected for the trade but healthy, acclimated fish can be very hardy and resilient in captivity.
