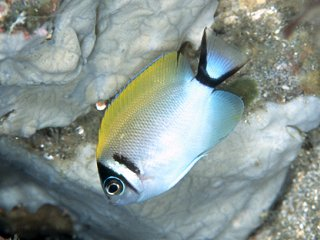

Conservation status
- Least Concern (IUCN 3.1)

Scientific classification
- Kingdom: Animalia
- Phylum: Chordata
- Class: Actinopterygii
- Order: Acanthuriformes
- Family: Pomacanthidae
- Genus: Genicanthus
- Species: G. semifasciatus

Binomial name
- Genicanthus semifasciatus (Kamohara, 1934)

Synonyms
- Holacanthus semifasciatus Kamohara, 1934

= Genicanthus semifasciatus =

Species of fish

Genicanthus semifasciatus, the Japanese swallow, is a species of marine ray-finned fish, a marine angelfish, belonging to the family Pomacanthidae. It is found in the Western Pacific.

== Description ==
Genicanthus semifasciatus is sexually dichromatic; the males and females show different colouration and patterning. The male has a yellow head and anterior flanks with a darker yellow dorsal area which is marked with dusky vertical bars. The dorsal area of females is greyish brown and white ventrally, with a yellow margin to the dorsal fin with a black head and caudal fin, and black on the head and tail. In both sexes the forked tail narrows at its base to create a "swallow tail". The dorsal fin contains 15 spines and 15–16 soft rays while the anal fin has 3 spines and 17 soft rays. This species attains a maximum total length of 21 centimetres (8.3 in).

== Distribution ==
Genicanthus semifasciatus is found in the Western Pacific Ocean. Here it is found from southern Japan, including the Ogasawara Islands, the Izu Islands and the Ryukyu Islands, to the northern Philippines.

== Habitat and biology ==
Genicanthus semifasciatus occurs at depths between 15 and 200 metres (49 and 656 ft). Here it can be found on the seaward sides of rocky and coral reefs. This species is protogynously hermaphroditic and is normally encountered in harems consisting of a male and several females. It feeds on plankton in the water column.

== Systematics ==
Genicanthus semifasciatus was first formally described in 1934 as Holocanthus semifasciatus by the Japanese ichthyologist Toshiji Kamohara (1901–1972) with the type locality given as Kashiwajima in the Kochi Prefecture of Japan. The specific name is a compound of semi meaning "half" and fasciatus meaning "banded", referring to the banding on the males' backs which does not extend onto the abdomen.

== Utilisation ==
Genicanthus semifasciatus is rather infrequently found in the aquarium trade. The specimens which do appear in the trade usually come from the Philippines.
