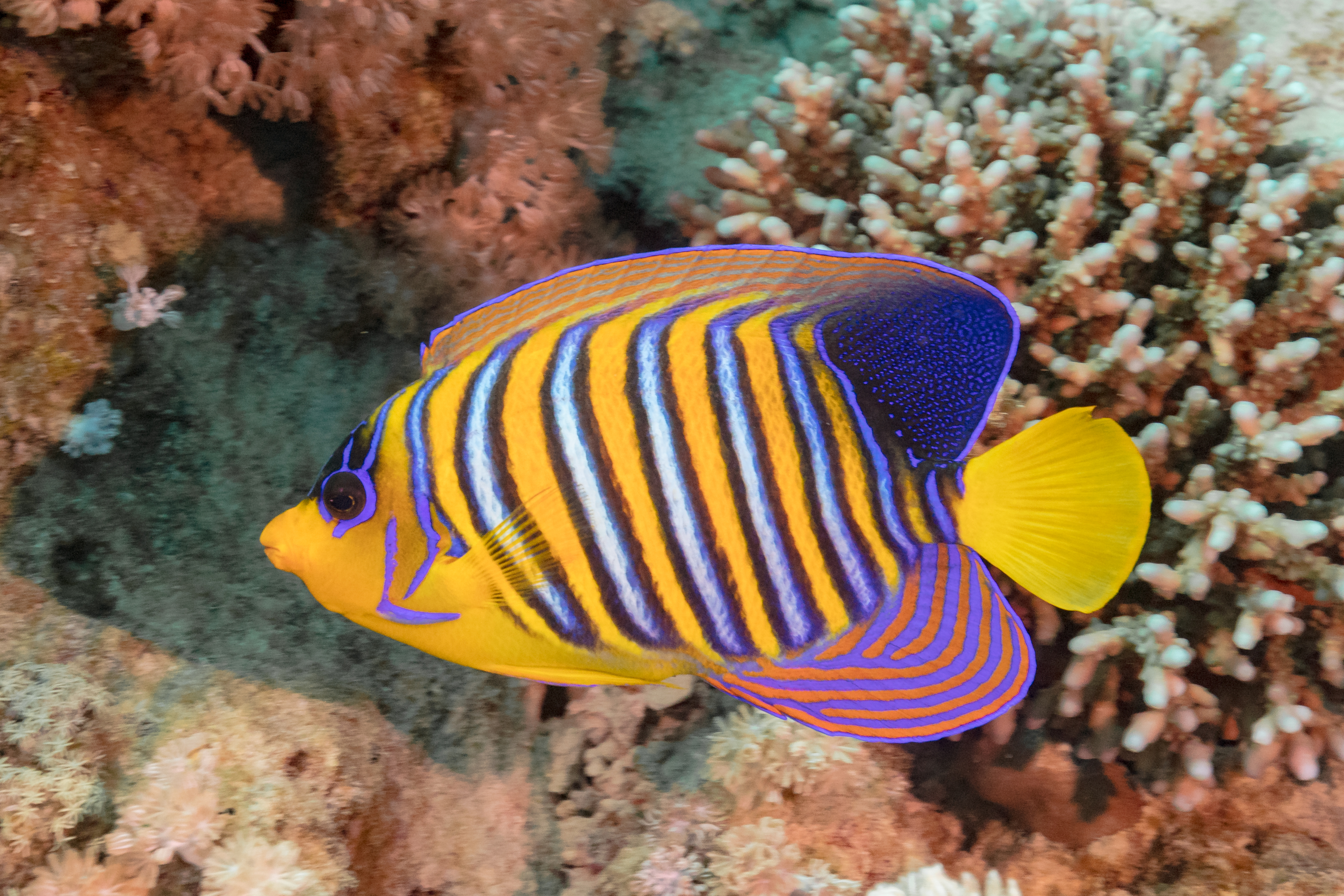
- In the Red Sea

Conservation status
- Least Concern (IUCN 3.1)

Scientific classification
- Kingdom: Animalia
- Phylum: Chordata
- Class: Actinopterygii
- Division: Teleostei
- Order: Acanthuriformes
- Family: Pomacanthidae
- Genus: Pygoplites; Fraser-Brunner, 1933
- Species: P. diacanthus

Binomial name
- Pygoplites diacanthus (Boddaert, 1772)

Synonyms
- Chaetodon diacanthus Boddaert, 1772; Holacanthus diacanthus (Boddaert, 1772)

= Royal angelfish =

Species of fish

The royal angelfish (Pygoplites diacanthus), or regal angelfish, is a species of marine ray-finned fish, a marine angelfish belonging to the family Pomacanthidae, and the monotypic genus Pygoplites. It is found in tropical Indo-Pacific oceans. It can grow as long as 25 cm (9.8 in).

== Distribution ==
The royal angelfish is widely distributed throughout the Indo-Pacific. The species can be found in the Red Sea and Indian Ocean around East Africa and the Maldives, stretching to the Tuamoto Islands, New Caledonia, and Great Barrier Reef. The northernmost limits of its range ends in the southern East China Sea around Taiwan and the Ryukyu Islands and Ogasawara Islands of Japan.

== Description ==
Juvenile

The body of the royal angelfish is moderately elongate and is very compressed. The preorbital bone is convex and has no strong spines. There is 1 prominent spine at an angle at the preopercal. The ventral edge of the interopercle is smooth. The eyes are moderately small along with the mouth that is terminal. The mouth is also protractile. They have a maximum length of 25.0 cm (9.8 in). They have a total of 14 dorsal spines, and 17–19 soft dorsal rays. They have 3 anal spines and 17–19 anal soft rays. They also have 16–17 pectoral fin rays. Their caudal fin is rounded. The precise coloration of this fish can vary as regional differences can occur, most notably in populations from the Indian Ocean, Red Sea, and South Pacific Ocean. A commonality, however, is a body edged in narrow blue-white and orange stripes that are narrow and angle backward. The posterior portion of dorsal fin is black or blue with close-set blue dots, and the posterior portion of anal fin has alternating yellow and blue bands running parallel to body contour. The caudal fin is yellow. Juveniles are colored with a large dark spot on basal portion of the soft dorsal fin. They have been reported of living 15 years.

Recent research indicates that the Pygoplites comprises two morphs, with the variants potentially hybridizing at Christmas Island.

(Indian Ocean)

(Red Sea)

(Indo-Pacific)

== Ecology ==
The royal angelfish occurs at depths ranging from 0 to 80 m (0 to 262 ft), in coral rich areas of lagoons, reefs, and are also often found in the vicinity of caves. It is a carnivorous species that feeds on sponges and tunicates located throughout reefs and underwater caves. They are a non-migratory species that can be found solitary, in pairs, or groups. The juveniles usually shelter in cracks and crevices.

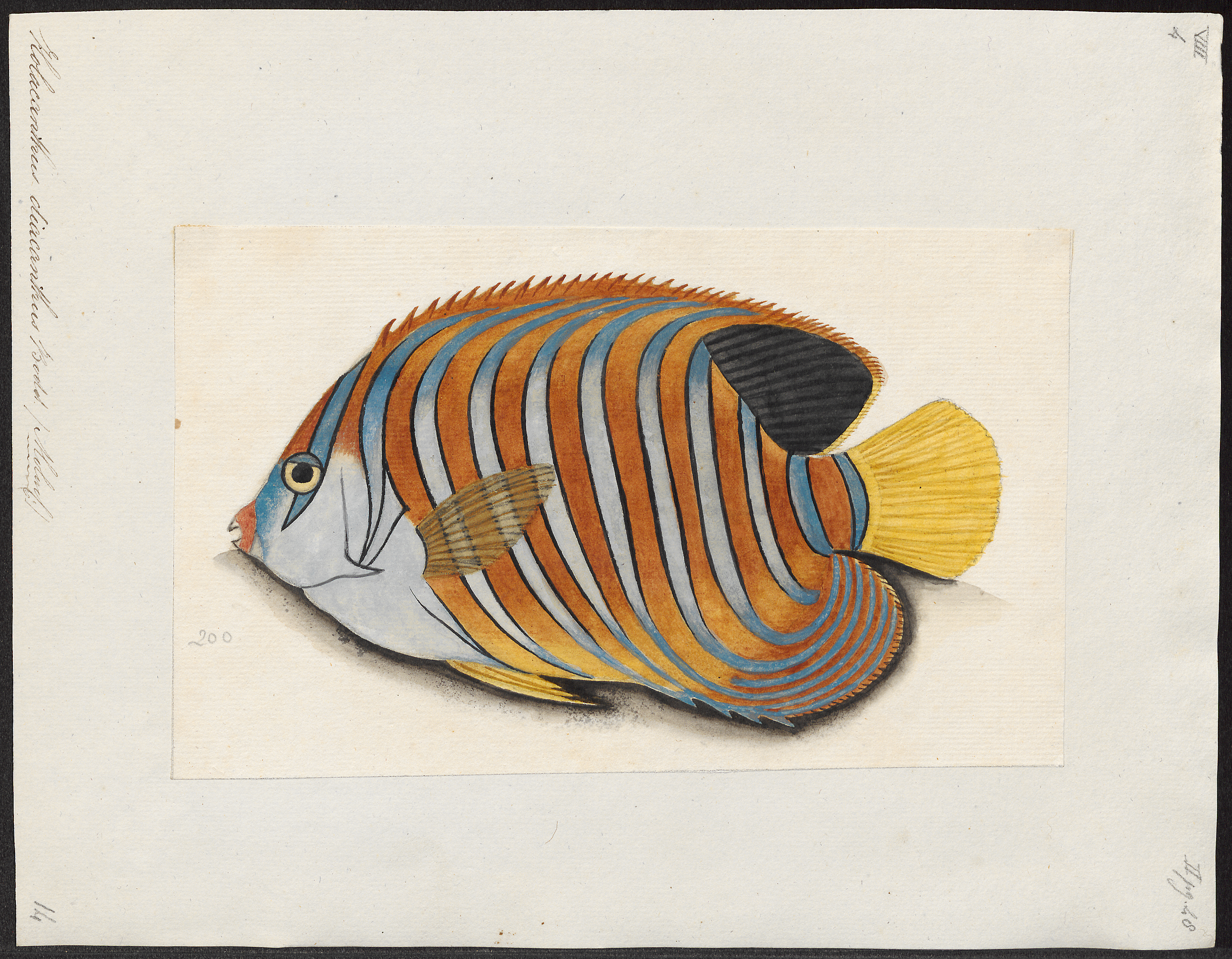
A print from the University of Amsterdam

== History ==
The royal angelfish was first formally described in 1772 by the Dutch naturalist Pieter Boddaert, it has been the subject of 18th and 19th century zoological art.

== Human uses ==
The royal angelfish is considered to be harmless to humans, and has minor commercial use in the aquarium industry. It is valued by aquarium hobbyists for being one of the few "reef safe" angelfish as its diet is composed primarily of sponges, and does not include corals.

== In the aquarium ==
The royal angelfish can be challenging to keep in captivity, a healthy specimen that is given the right environment will likely start feeding within days when fed a variety of live, frozen, and flake or freeze-dried foods to entice satiety. A hostile environment will directly counter acclimation and feeding efforts. As such, large angelfish, triggerfish, puffers, as well some overly aggressive clownfish and surgeonfish should be avoided.

== Reproduction ==
Royal angelfish reproduce by spawning, spawning usually happens at dusk or at night. They then act in a spiraling dance before the eggs and sperm are released into the upper water column.
