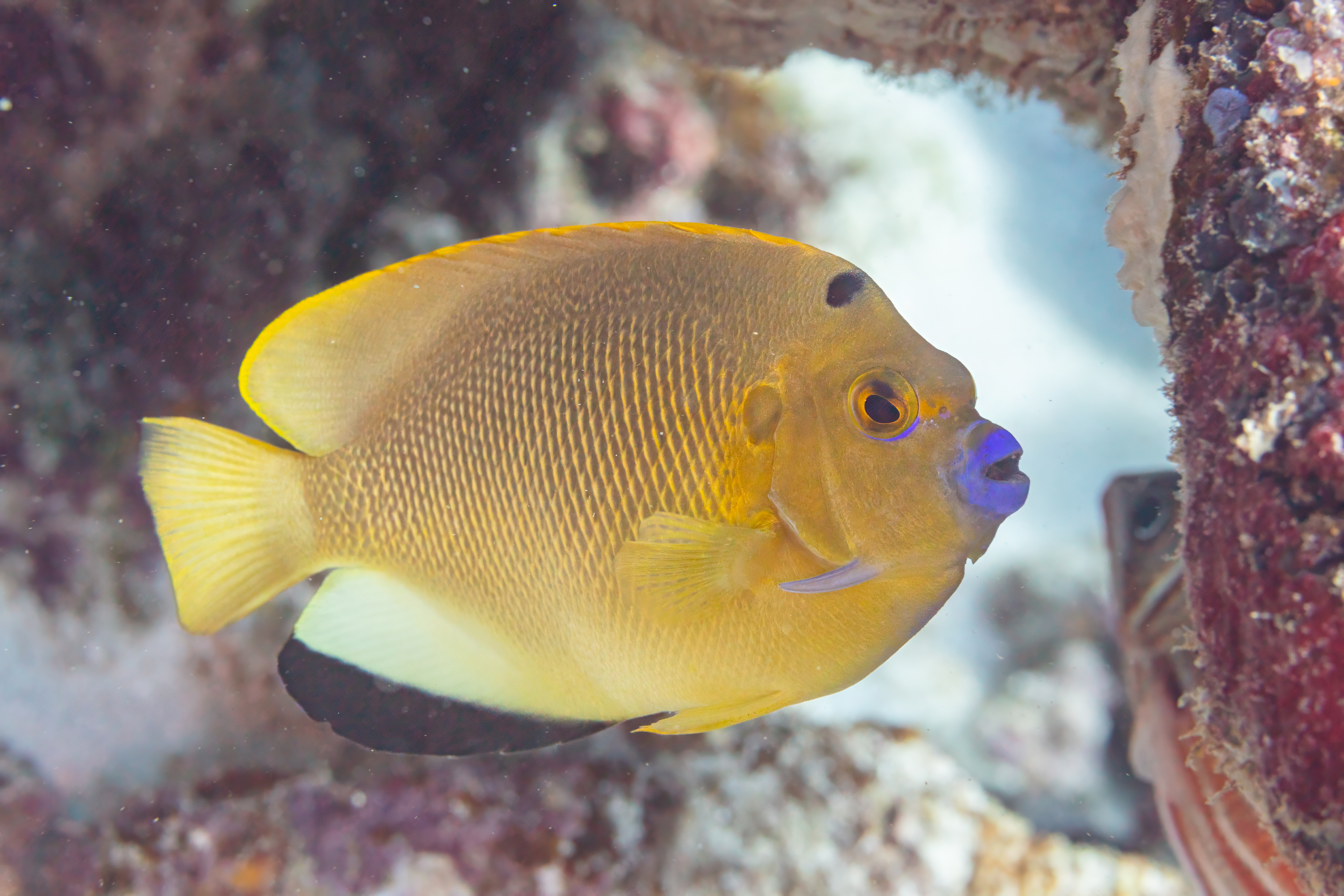

Conservation status
- Least Concern (IUCN 3.1)

Scientific classification
- Kingdom: Animalia
- Phylum: Chordata
- Class: Actinopterygii
- Order: Acanthuriformes
- Family: Pomacanthidae
- Genus: Apolemichthys
- Species: A. trimaculatus

Binomial name
- Apolemichthys trimaculatus (Cuvier, 1831)

Synonyms
- Holacanthus trimaculatus Cuvier, 1831

= Apolemichthys trimaculatus =

Species of fish

Apolemichthys trimaculatus, the threespot angelfish or flagfin angelfish, is a demersal marine ray-finned fish in the angelfish family Pomacanthidae. It has a wide Indo-Pacific distribution.

== Systematics ==
Apolemichthys trimaculatus was first formally described as Holacanthus trimaculatus in 1831 by the French anatomist Georges Cuvier (1769-1832) with the type locality given as the Molucca Islands.

== Description ==
Apolemichthys trimaculatus is a bright yellow species of marine angelfish. It has blue lips, a wide black margin to the anal fin, a black spot on the forehead and a faint spot just to the rear of the operculum. Juveniles lack the spots and instead have a thin black band running vertically through the eye, as well as vertical golden bars on the flanks. The dorsal fin contains 14 spines and 16-18 soft rays while the anal fin has 3 spines and 17-19 soft rays, and this species attains a maximum total length of 26 cm (10 in).

== Distribution ==
Apolemichthys trimaculatus is widely distributed throughout the tropical waters of the Indian Ocean, from the coast of East Africa between Tanzania and Mozambique to the western Pacific Ocean (where it reaches as far east as Samoa). It is found as far north as southern Japan and as far south as New Caledonia. In Australia, it is found at Ningaloo Reef, Rowley Shoals and Scott Reef in Western Australia; Ashmore Reef in the Timor Sea and the Great Barrier Reef in Queensland.

== Habitat and biology ==
Apolemichthys trimaculatus is found at depths of 10–80 m (33–262 ft) where it lives on outer coral reef slopes and drop-offs. Here, it feeds mainly on benthic invertebrates, mainly sponges and tunicates, although crustaceans are also taken. Juveniles are more secretive and solitary than adults and typically remain deeper than 25 m (82 ft). Adults are normally encountered at moderate depths in small, loosely organized groups, with 2-7 females for a male. Males are territorial.

Apolemichthys trimaculatus is diurnal and a protogynous hermaphrodite: all fry are females, and it is possible for them to change sex later in life.

== Relationship with humans ==
Apolemichthys trimaculatus is frequently found in the aquarium trade.
