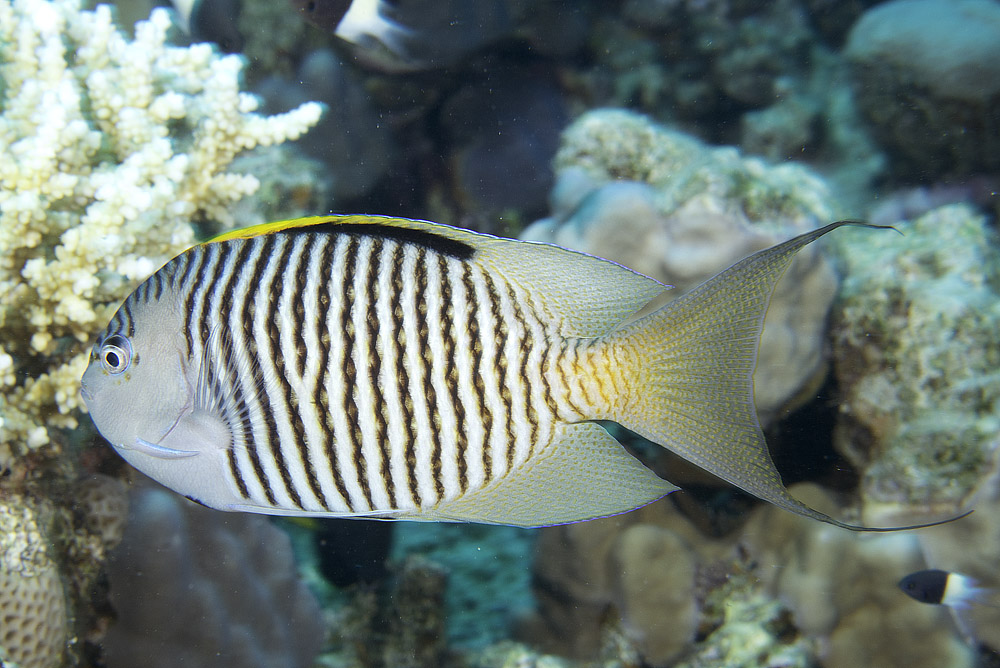
- Male
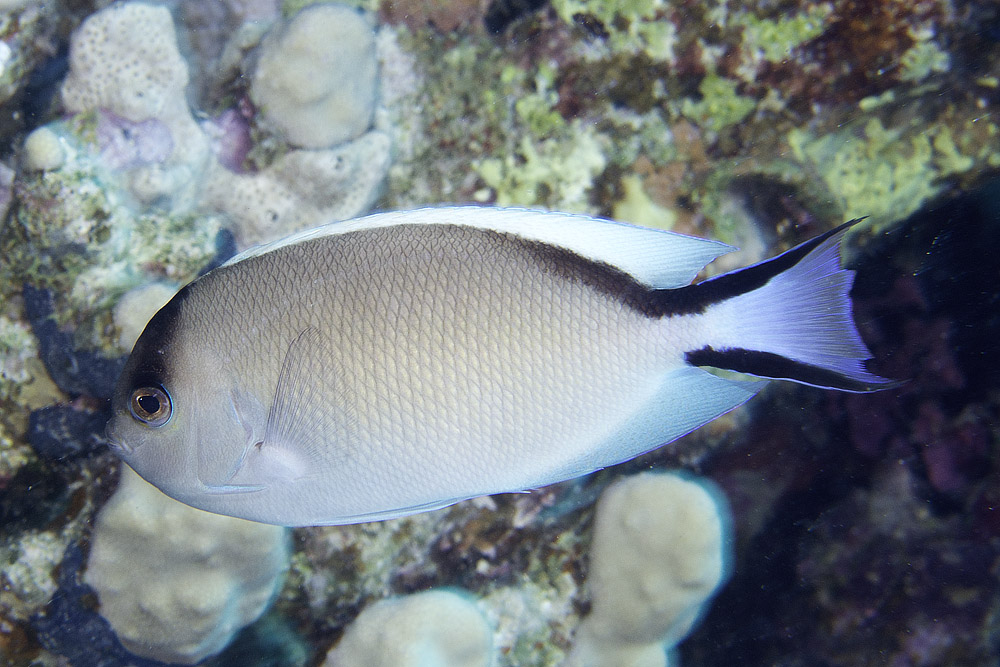
- Female

Conservation status
- Least Concern (IUCN 3.1)

Scientific classification
- Kingdom: Animalia
- Phylum: Chordata
- Class: Actinopterygii
- Order: Acanthuriformes
- Family: Pomacanthidae
- Genus: Genicanthus
- Species: G. caudovittatus

Binomial name
- Genicanthus caudovittatus (Günther, 1860)

Synonyms
- Holacanthus caudovittatus Günther, 1860; Centropyge caudovittatus (Günther, 1860); Holacanthus zebra Sauvage, 1891; Holacanthus caudibicolor Sauvage, 1891

= Genicanthus caudovittatus =

Species of fish

Genicanthus caudovittatus, the zebra angelfish, swallowtail angelfish, and lyretail angelfish, is a species of marine ray-finned fish, a marine angelfish belonging to the family Pomacanthidae. It is found in the Indian Ocean.

== Description ==
Genicanthus caudovittatus shows sexual dichromatism, the males and females have differing colouration. The males are whitish-blue marked with vertical dark brown barring and a black band running along the middle of the dorsal fin base. The females are pale pinkish grey with a black band over the eye and a black band on the upper and lower margins of the caudal fin. Both sexes have a markedly forked caudal fin. The dorsal fin contains 15 spines and 15–17 soft rays while the anal fin has 3 spines and 17–19 soft rays. This species attains a maximum total length of 20 centimetres (7.9 in).

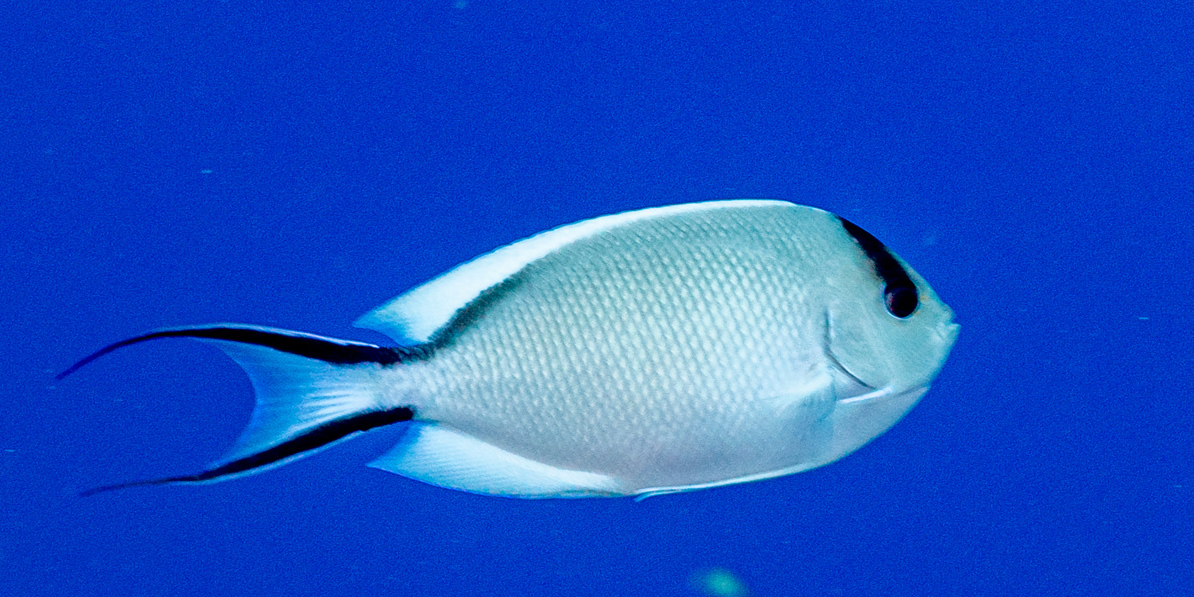
Female

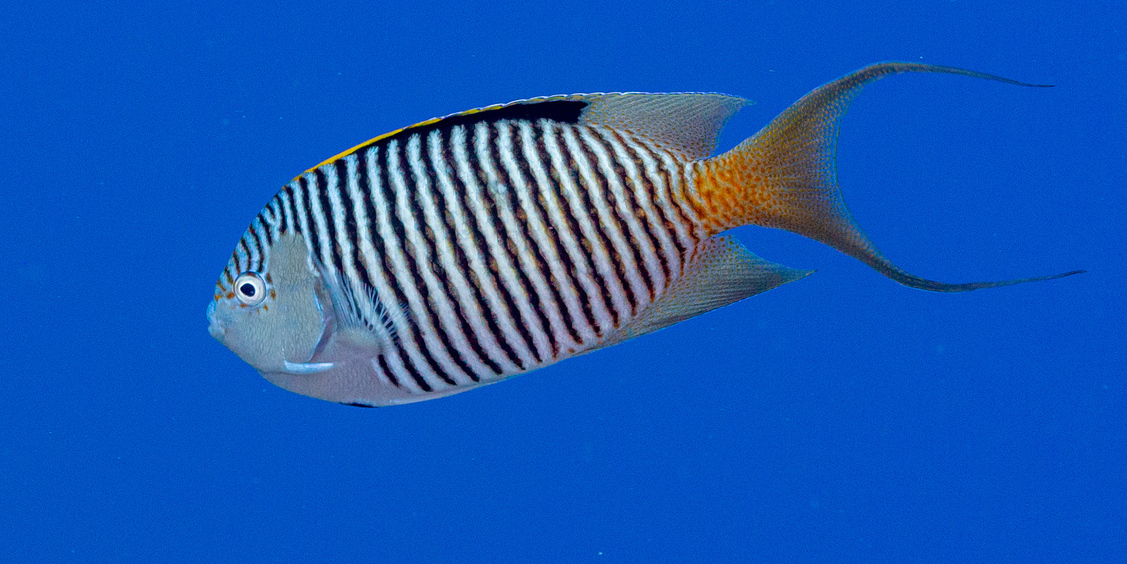
Male

== Distribution ==
Genicanthus caudovittatus is distributed in western Indian Ocean where it occurs along the eastern coast of Africa from the Red Sea in the north to KwaZulu-Natal in South Africa, east to Madagascar, Maldives, Mauritius, and Réunion. It has also been recorded from Weh Island off northwestern Sumatra.

== Habitat and biology ==
Genicanthus caudovittatus is found at depths between 15 and 70 metres (49 and 230 ft). In the Red Sea it can be found in shallower water than in the Andaman Sea. It can be found on steep outer reef slopes where it lives in small groups made up of a male and a few females. It feeds on plankton. Juveniles live at greater depth than the adults.

== Systematics ==
Genicanthus caudovittatus was first formally described in 1860 as Holocanthus caudovittatus by the German-born British ichthyologist and herpetologist Albert Günther (1830–1914) with the type locality given as Mauritius. The specific name is a compound of caudus meaning "tail" and vittatus meaning "banded", referring to the black markings on the tail.

== Utilisation ==
Genicanthus caudovittatus occasionally appears in the aquarium trade.
