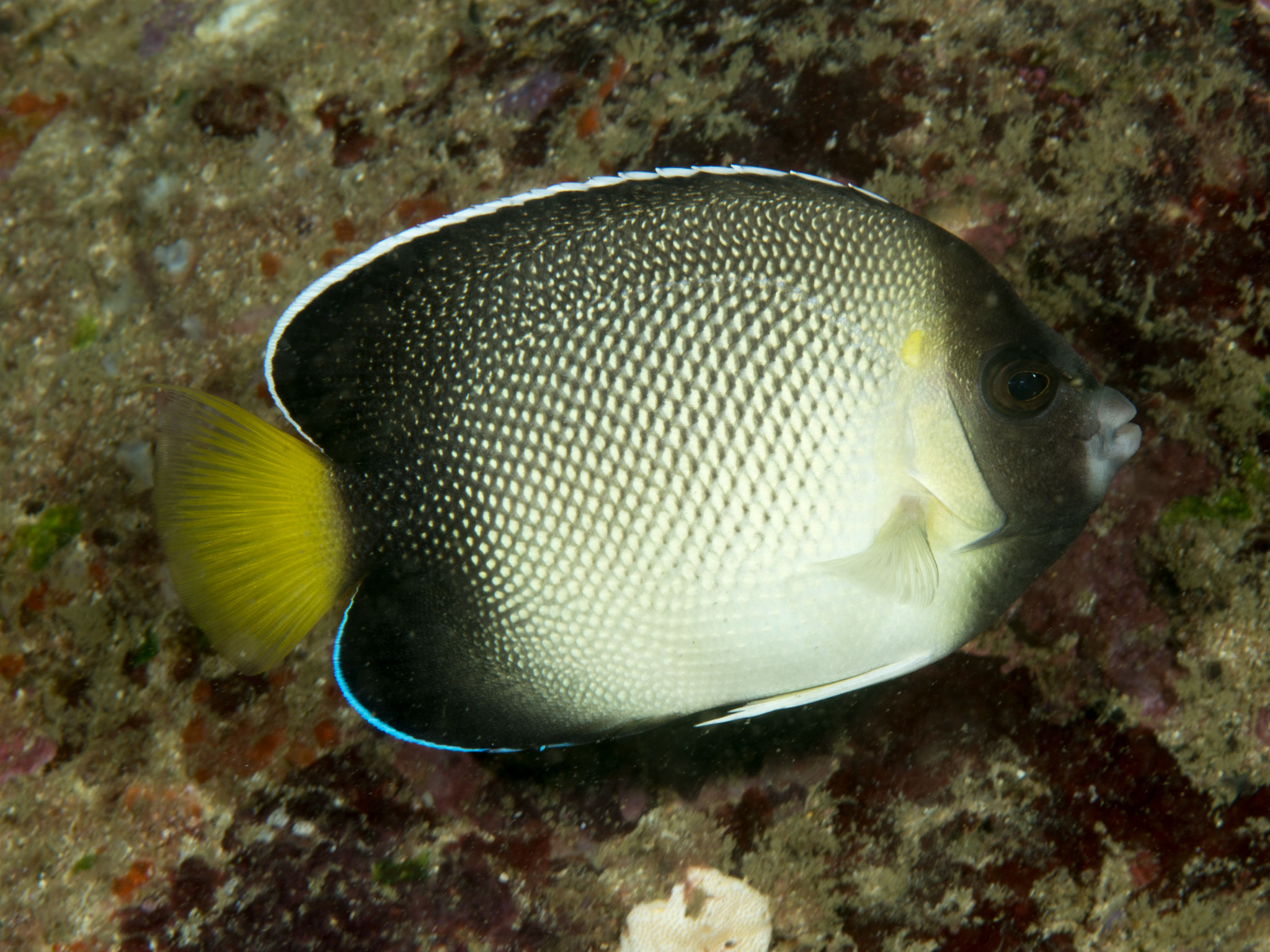
- Apolemichthys xanthurus, the type species of this genus

Scientific classification
- Kingdom: Animalia
- Phylum: Chordata
- Class: Actinopterygii
- Order: Acanthuriformes
- Family: Pomacanthidae
- Genus: Apolemichthys; Burton, 1934

Type species
- Holacanthus xanthurus Bennett 1833

Species
- 8, see text

= Apolemichthys =

Genus of fishes

Apolemichthys is a genus of marine angelfishes in the family Pomacanthidae.

== Species ==
Image	Scientific name	Common name	Distribution
	Apolemichthys arcuatus (Linnaeus, 1758)	Banded angelfish	reefs in Hawaii and the Johnston Atoll.
	Apolemichthys griffisi (Carlson & Taylor, 1981)	Griffis angelfish	Pacific Ocean
	Apolemichthys guezei (Randall & Maugé, 1978)	Reunion angelfish	Réunion Indian Ocean
	Apolemichthys kingi Heemstra, 1984	Tiger angelfish	Western Indian Ocean: Natal, South Africa and Mozambique
	Apolemichthys trimaculatus (Cuvier, 1831)	Threespot angelfish	Indian Ocean and western Pacific Ocean
	Apolemichthys xanthopunctatus Burgess, 1973	Goldspotted angelfish	Pacific Ocean: Gilbert Islands to the Line islands. Reported from Kapingamarangi Atoll (eastern Caroline Islands), Nauru, Canton (Phoenix Islands), Howland, Baker, and Fanning (Line Islands) Atolls.
	Apolemichthys xanthotis (Fraser-Brunner, 1950)	Yellow-ear angelfish	Red Sea, from the Gulf of Aqaba in the north, down through the Gulf of Aden in the south
	Apolemichthys xanthurus (Bennett, 1833)	Yellowtail angelfish,	Maldives and the east coast of India.

Fishbase still has Apolemichthys armitagei listed as a species within this genus but notes that it is a hybrid between Apolemichthys trimaculatus and Apolemichthys xanthurus. Fishbase state that the page will be removed as part of their next update.
