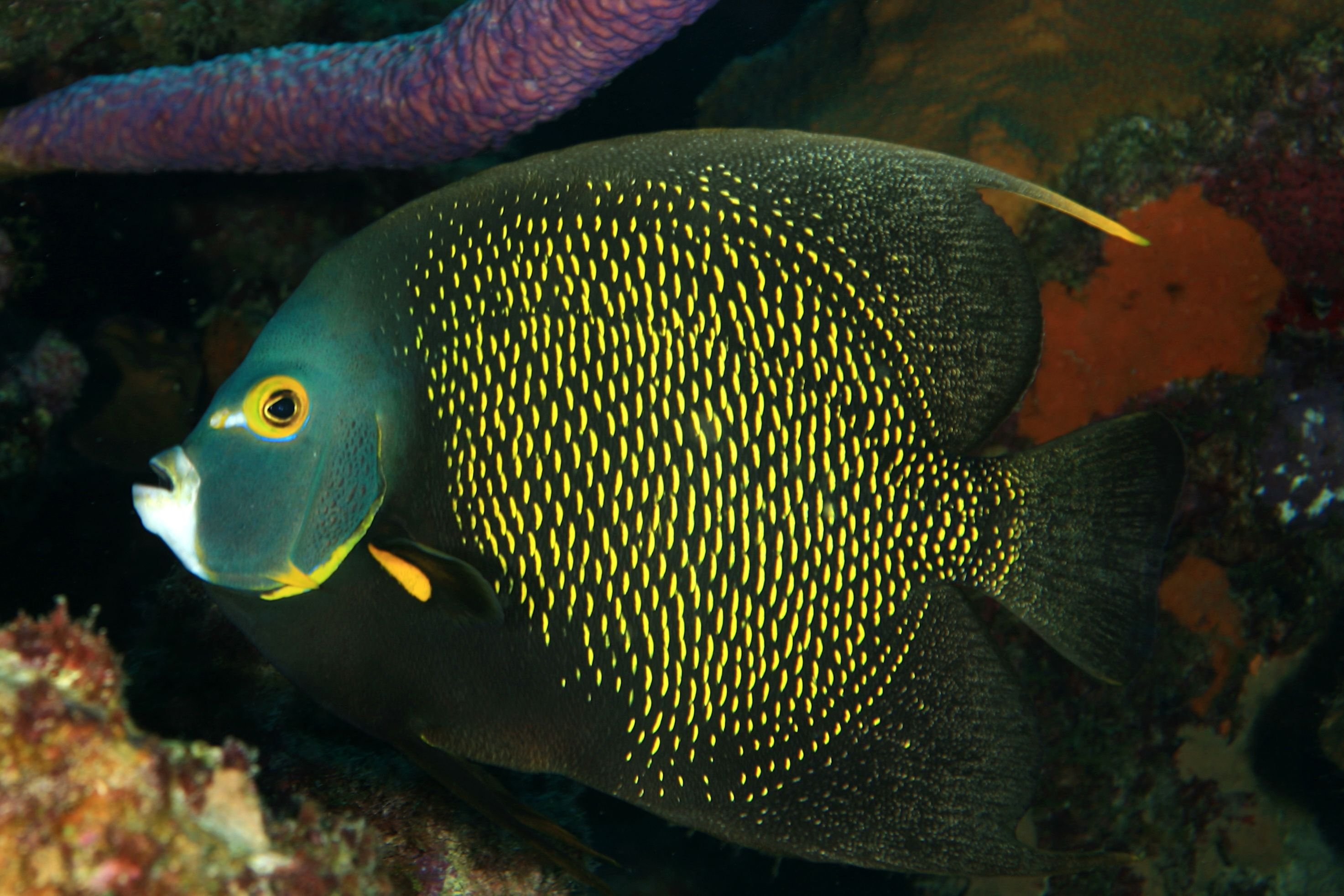
- French angelfish (Pomacanthus paru)

Scientific classification
- Kingdom: Animalia
- Phylum: Chordata
- Class: Actinopterygii
- Order: Acanthuriformes
- Family: Pomacanthidae; Jordan & Evermann, 1898

Genera
- See text

= Pomacanthidae =

Marine angelfish

Family of fishes

Marine angelfish are perciform fish of the family Pomacanthidae. They are found on shallow reefs in the tropical Atlantic, Indian, and mostly western Pacific Oceans. The family contains seven genera and about 86 species. They should not be confused with the freshwater angelfish, tropical cichlids of the Amazon Basin.

== Description ==
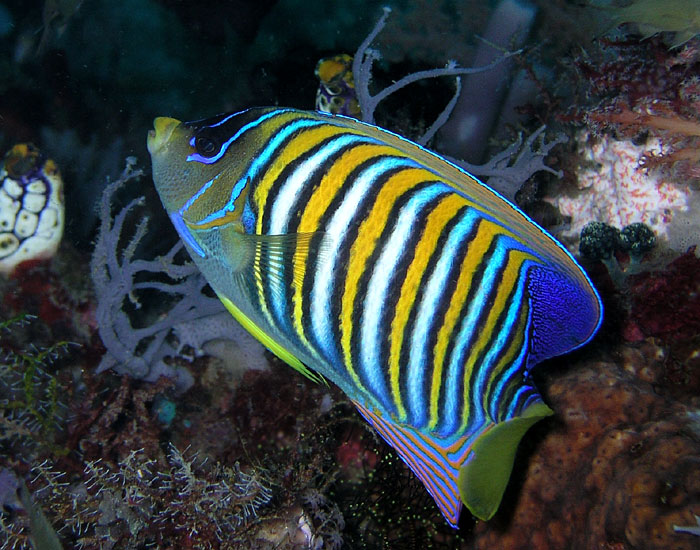
Royal angelfish (Pygoplites diacanthus) from East Timor

With their bright colours and deep, laterally compressed bodies, marine angelfishes are some of the more conspicuous residents of the reef. They most closely resemble the butterflyfishes, a related family of similarly showy reef fish. Marine angelfish are distinguished from butterflyfish by the presence of strong preopercle spines (part of the gill covers) in the former. This feature also explains the family name Pomacanthidae; from the Greek πομα, poma meaning "cover" and ακάνθα, akantha meaning "thorn".

Many species of marine angelfishes have streamer-like extensions of the soft dorsal and anal fins. The fish have small mouths, relatively large pectoral fins, and rounded to lunate tail fins. The largest species, the gray angelfish, Pomacanthus arcuatus, may reach a length of 60 cm (24 in); at the other extreme, members of the genus Centropyge do not exceed 15 cm (5.9 in). A length of 20 to 30 cm (7.9 to 11.8 in) is typical for the rest of the family. The smaller species are popular amongst aquarists, whereas the largest species are occasionally sought as a food fish; however, ciguatera poisoning has been reported as a result of eating marine angelfish.

Angelfish vary in color and are very hardy fish. When kept in aquariums they can easily adapt to pH and hardness changes in water and can handle conditions that are not considered to be perfect. They are usually a long-living species and are easy to care for. They were very expensive in the aquarium trade when first discovered, but have become more popular and therefore less pricey.

The queen angelfish grows to be 45 cm (18 in). With neon blue and yellow scales and iridescent purple and orange markings, surprisingly it is not conspicuous, and actually hides very well, and is very shy.

As juveniles, some species are different colors than when they reach adulthood. For example, the Blue Angelfish is a vibrant, electric blue color with black and white stripes or spots. When they reach adulthood, they turn a grayish color with yellow and blue fins and dark spots on their bodies.

== Behavior ==
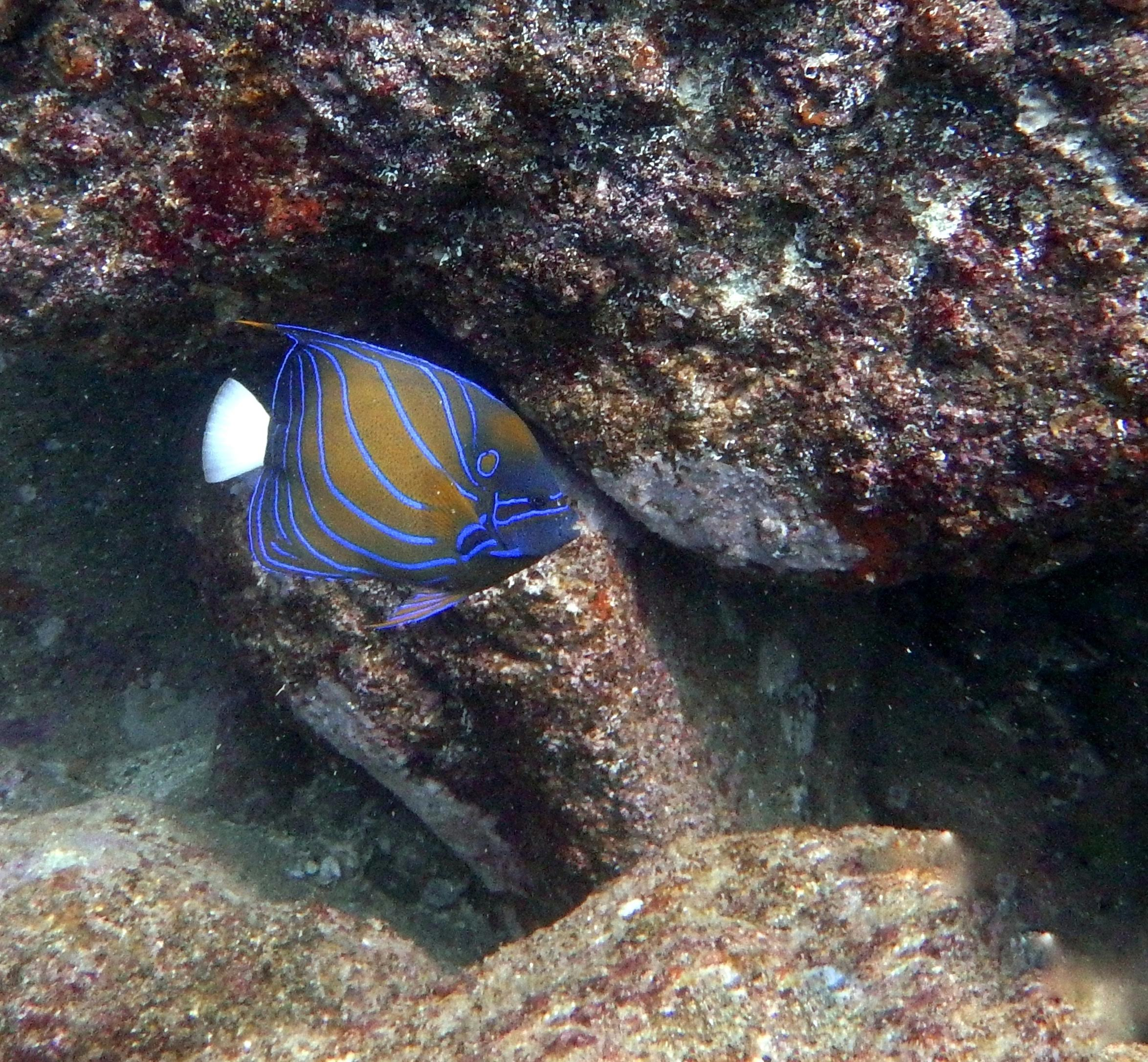
Blue ring angelfish Pomacanthus annularis at Bomb bay, Netrani Island, India

The larger species are also quite bold and seemingly fearless; they are known to approach divers. While the majority adapts easily to captive life, some are specialist feeders which are difficult to maintain. Feeding habits can be strictly defined through genus, with Genicanthus species feeding on zooplankton and Centropyge preferring filamentous algae. Other species focus on sessile benthic invertebrates; sponges, tunicates, bryozoans, and hydroids are staples. On Caribbean coral reefs, angelfishes primarily eat sponges, and have an important role in preventing the overgrowth of reef-building corals by eating faster-growing sponge species.

Most marine angelfishes restrict themselves to the shallows of the reef, seldom venturing deeper than 50 m (160 ft). The recently described Centropyge abei is known to inhabit depths of 150 m (490 ft). They are diurnal animals, hiding amongst the nooks and crevices of the reef by night. Some species are solitary in nature and form highly territorial mated pairs; others form harems with a single male dominant over several females. As juveniles, some species may eke out a living as cleaner fish.

=== Reproduction ===
Common to many species is a dramatic shift in coloration associated with maturity. For example, young male ornate angelfish, Genicanthus bellus, have broad, black bands and are indistinguishable from females; as they mature, bright orange bands develop on the flanks and back. Thought to correspond to social rank, these colour shifts are not necessarily confined to males; all marine angelfish species are known to be protogynous hermaphrodites. This means that if the dominant male of a harem is removed, a female will turn into a functional male.

As pelagic spawners, marine angelfishes release many tiny buoyant eggs into the water which then become part of the plankton. The eggs float freely with the currents until hatching, with a high number falling victim to planktonic feeders.

In aquariums, two fish usually will breed within their community but will harass other fish in the tank, so it is best they have their own with plenty of room.

== Taxonomy ==
The Pomacanthidae is frequently placed within the large order Perciformes but taxonomists have also placed the family within the order Acanthuriformes, alongside the Chaetodontidae and Acanthuridae, among others. Other authorities have resolved the family as incertae sedis.

There are 88 species in eight genera:

The more speciose genera are, generally speaking, widely distributed, however some species, especially of the Centropyge genus, are range restricted or endemic to specific islands or small island groups.

Image	Genus	Number of Extant Species
	Apolemichthys M. Burton, 1934	8
	Centropyge Kaup, 1860	35
	Chaetodontoplus Bleeker, 1876	13
	Genicanthus Swainson, 1839	10
	Holacanthus Lacépède, 1803	8
	Paracentropyge W. E. Burgess, 1992	1
	Pomacanthus Lacépède, 1802	13
	Pygoplites Fraser-Brunner, 1933	1
