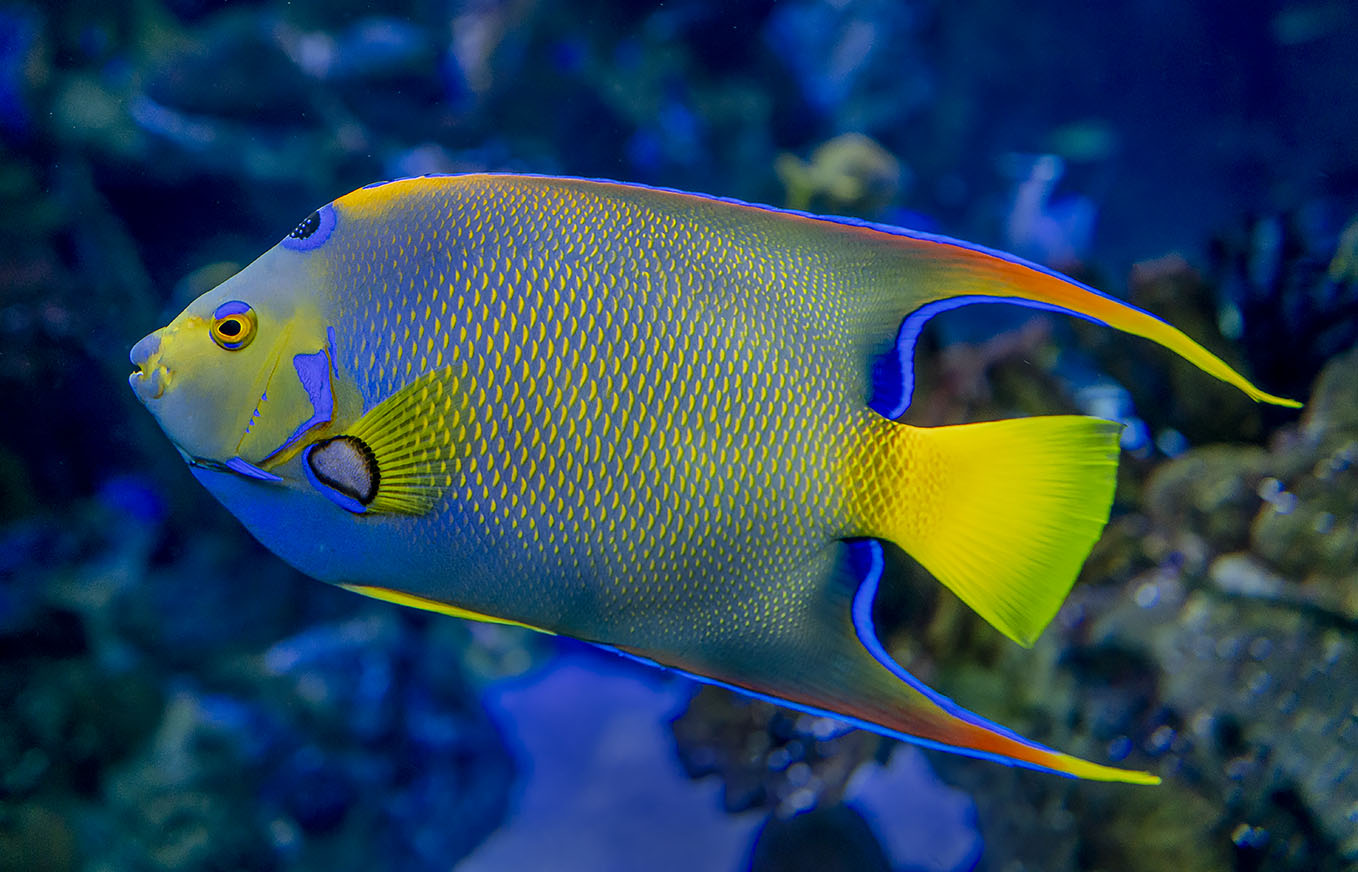
- Adult

Conservation status
- Least Concern (IUCN 3.1)

Scientific classification
- Kingdom: Animalia
- Phylum: Chordata
- Class: Actinopterygii
- Division: Teleostei
- Order: Acanthuriformes
- Family: Pomacanthidae
- Genus: Holacanthus
- Species: H. ciliaris

Binomial name
- Holacanthus ciliaris (Linnaeus, 1758)
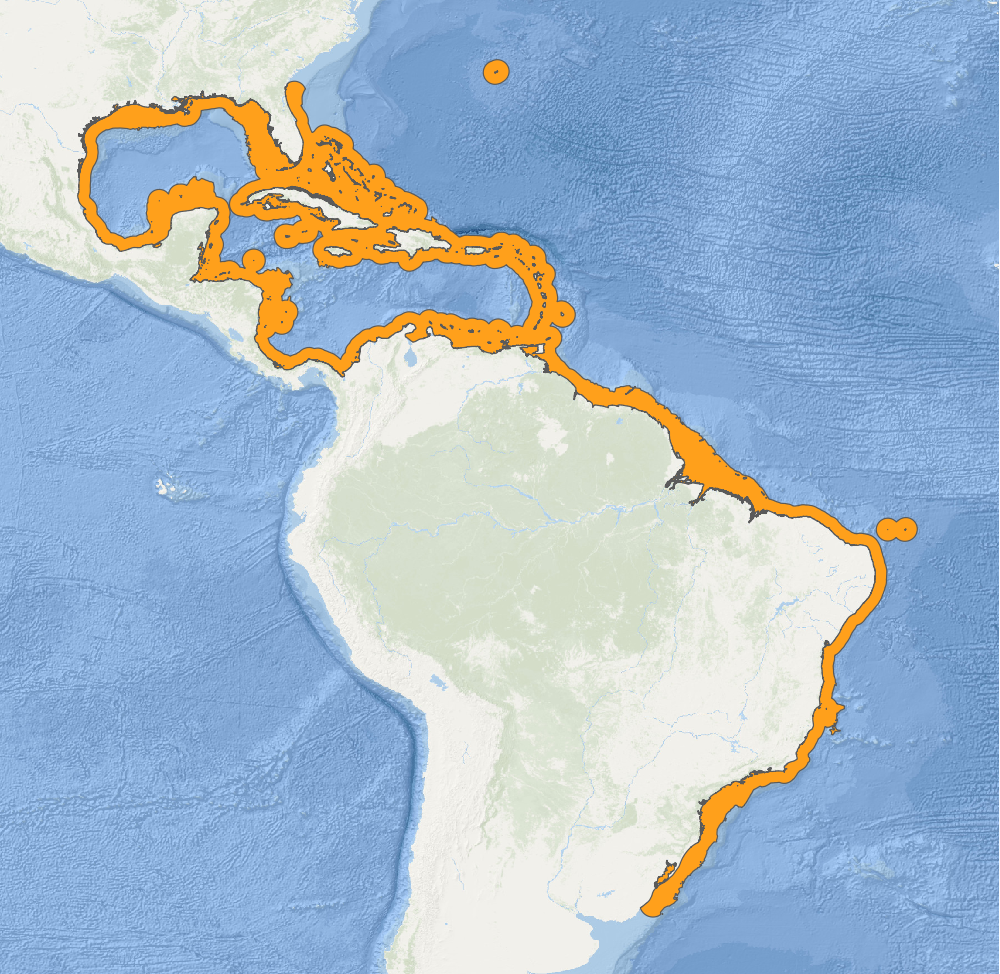
- Range of the queen angelfish

Synonyms
- Chaetodon ciliaris Linnaeus, 1758; Angelichthys ciliaris (Linnaeus, 1758); Chaetodon squamulosus Shaw, 1796; Chaetodon parrae Bloch & Schneider, 1801; Holacanthus coronatus Desmarest, 1823; Holacanthus formosus Castelnau, 1855; Holacanthus iodocus Jordan & Rutter, 1897; Angelichthys iodocus (Jordan & Rutter, 1897); Holacanthus lunatus Blosser, 1909

= Queen angelfish =

Species of marine angelfish

The queen angelfish (Holacanthus ciliaris), also known as the blue angelfish, golden angelfish, or yellow angelfish, is a species of marine angelfish found in the western Atlantic Ocean. It is a benthic (ocean floor) warm-water species that lives in coral reefs. It is recognized by its blue and yellow coloration and a distinctive spot or "crown" on its forehead. This crown distinguishes it from the closely related and similar-looking Bermuda blue angelfish (Holacanthus bermudensis), with which it overlaps in range and can interbreed.

Adult queen angelfish are selective feeders and primarily eat sponges. Their social structure consists of harems which include one male and up to four females. They live within a territory where the females forage separately and are tended to by the male. Breeding in the species occurs near a full moon. The transparent eggs float in the water until they hatch. Juveniles of the species have different coloration than adults and act as cleaner fish.

The queen angelfish is popular in the aquarium trade and has been a particularly common exported species from Brazil. In 2010, the queen angelfish was assessed as least concern by the International Union for Conservation of Nature as the wild population appeared to be stable.

== Taxonomy ==
The queen angelfish was first described as Chaetodon ciliaris in 1758 by Carl Linnaeus in the 10th edition of his Systema Naturae, with the type locality given as the "Western Atlantic/Caribbean". In 1802 it was moved by French naturalist Bernard Germain de Lacépède to the genus Holacanthus, the name of which is derived from Ancient Greek ὅλος (hólos), meaning "full", and ἄκανθα (ákantha), meaning "spine". Its specific name ciliaris means "fringed", a reference to its squamis ciliatis ("ciliate scales"). Other common names for the species include "blue angelfish", "golden angelfish" and "yellow angelfish".

Marine angelfish of the genus Holacanthus likely emerged between 10.2 and 7.6 million years ago (mya). The Guinean angelfish (Holacanthus africanus), which is found off the coast of West Africa, is sister to all other species in the genus, indicating that the lineage colonized the Atlantic from the Indian Ocean. The closure of the Isthmus of Panama 3.5–3.1 mya led to the splitting off of the Tropical Eastern Pacific species. The closest relative and sister species of the queen angelfish is the sympatric and similar Bermuda blue angelfish (H. bermudensis), from which it split around 1.5 mya. They are known to interbreed, producing a hybrid known as the Townsend angelfish which has features similar to both parent species. The Townsend angelfish is fertile, and individuals can breed both with each other and with the two parent species.

The following cladogram is based on molecular evidence:

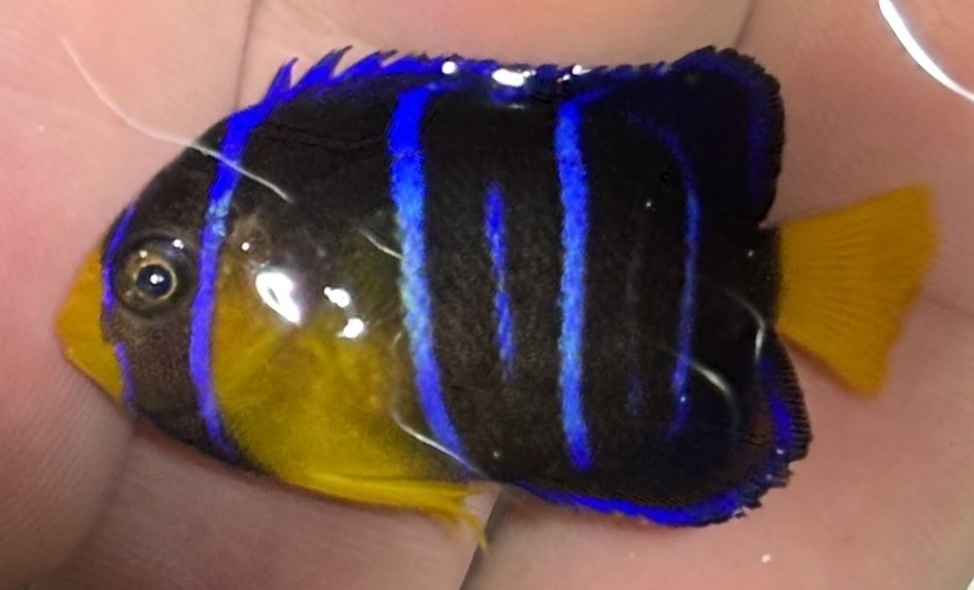
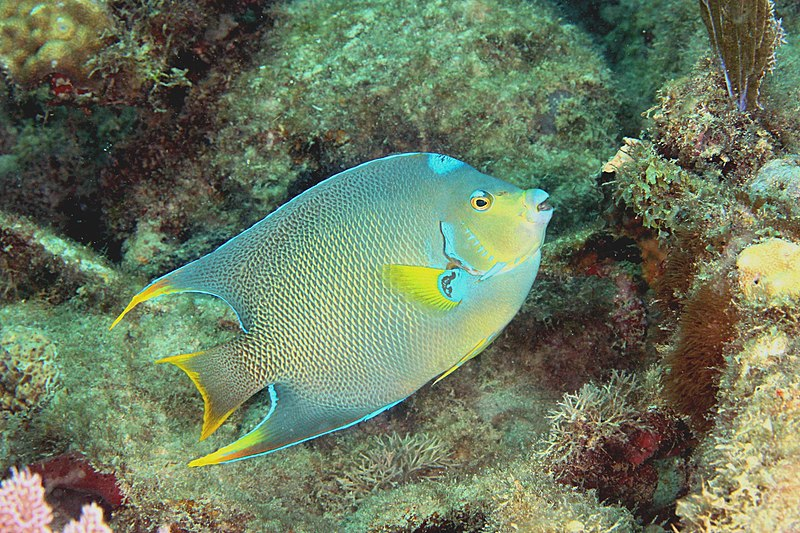
Townsend angelfish (H. ciliaris x bermudensis) hybrid.
Juvenile (top), adult (bottom).

- Holacanthus
  - - Rock beauty
    - - - Bermuda blue angelfish
        - Queen angelfish
      - - - Clarion angelfish
          - Clipperton angelfish
        - King angelfish
  - Guinean angelfish

== Description ==
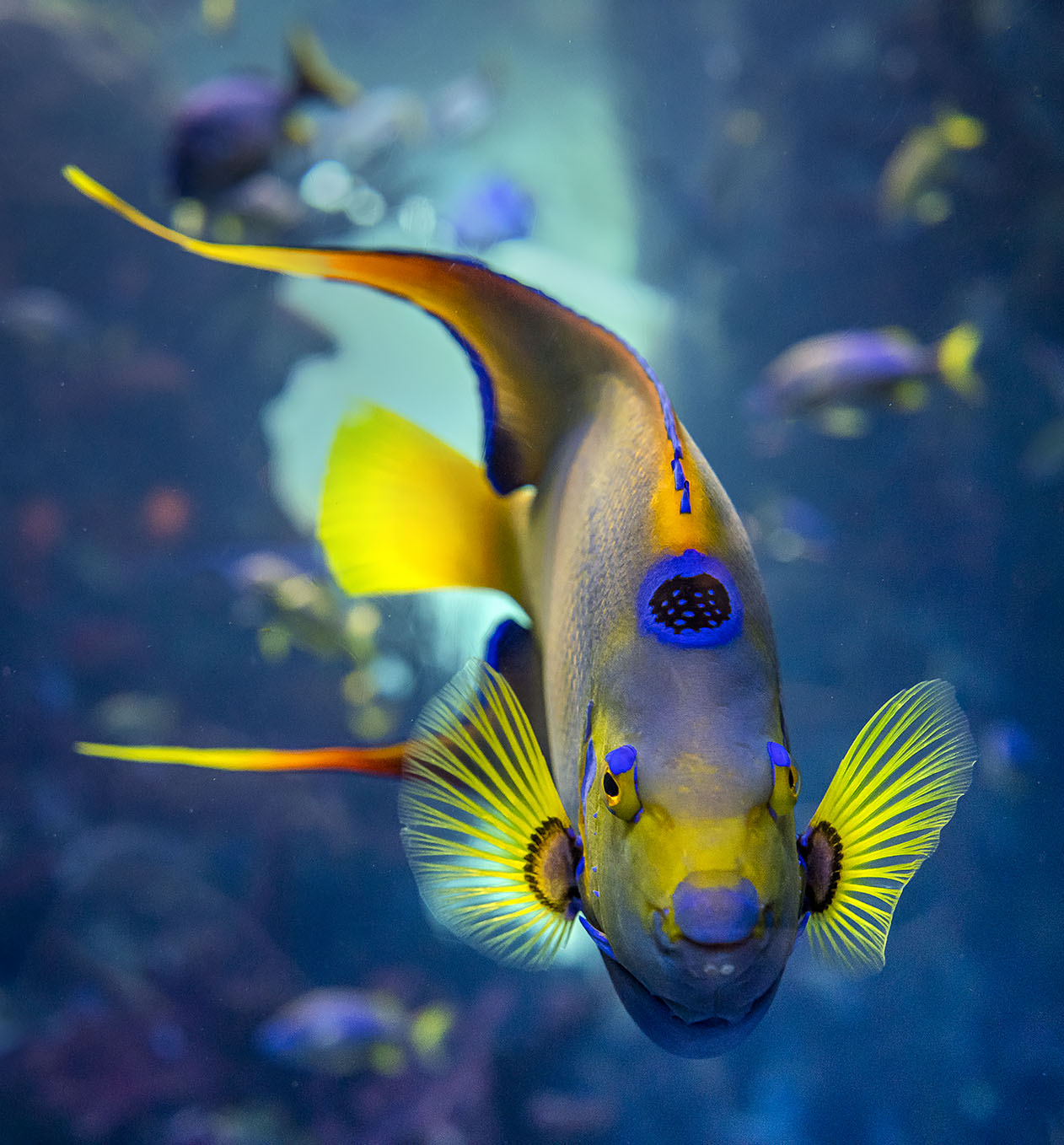
With "crown" visible

The queen angelfish has a broad, flattened, oval-shaped body with triangular tail fin, a reduced, dulled snout and a small mouth containing bristle-like teeth. The dorsal fin contains 14 spines and 19–21 soft rays, and the anal fin has 3 spines and 20–21 soft rays. The dorsal and anal fins both dangle behind the body. This species attains a maximum total length of 45 cm (18 in) and weight of 1,600 g (56 oz). Males may be larger than females.

The species is covered in yellow-tipped blue-green scales, with a bright yellow tail, pectoral and pelvic fins. Both the dorsal and anal fins have orange-yellow end points, while the pectoral fins have blue patches at the base. On the forehead is an eye-like spot or "crown" that is cobalt blue with an electric blue outer ring and dotted with electric blue spots. This crown is the main feature distinguishing the species from the Bermuda blue angelfish. Juveniles are dark blue with bright blue vertical stripes and a yellow pectoral area. They resemble juvenile blue angelfish and are distinguished by more curved vertical stripes. Growing juveniles develop transitional patterns as they reach their adult coloration.

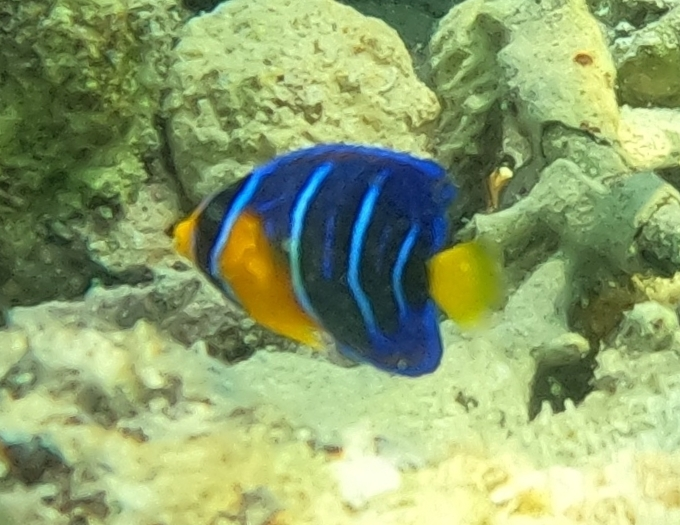
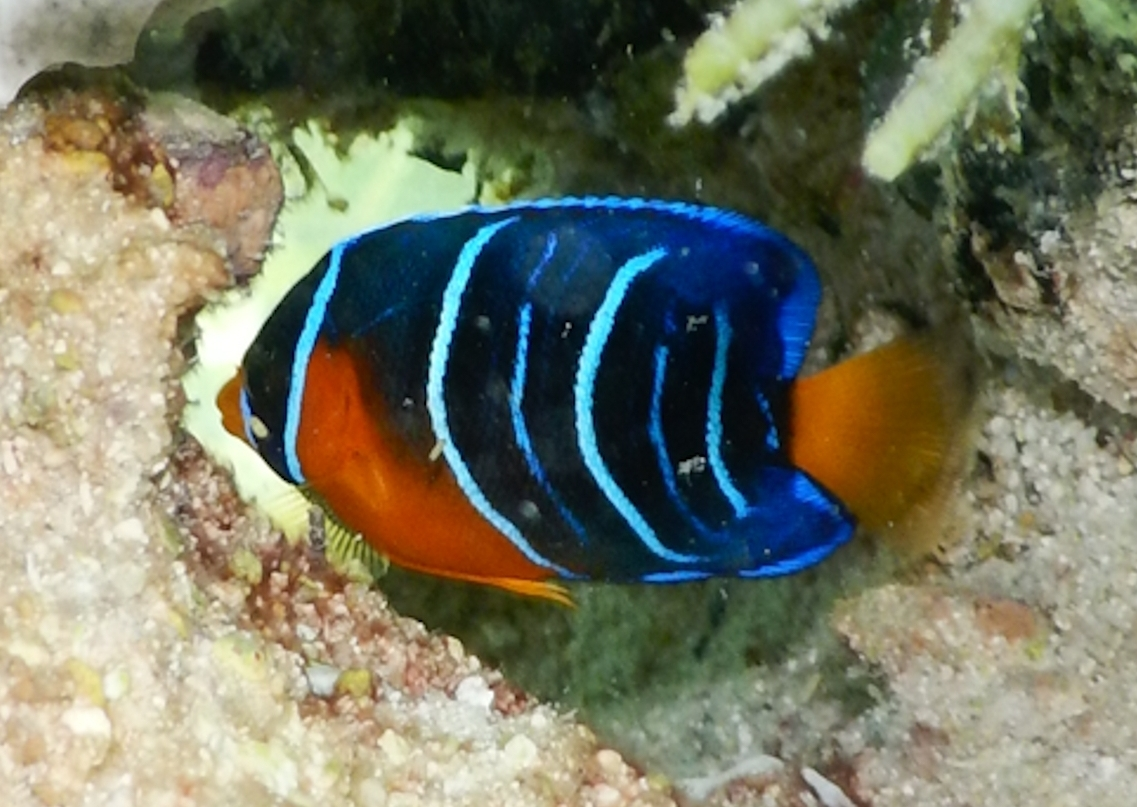
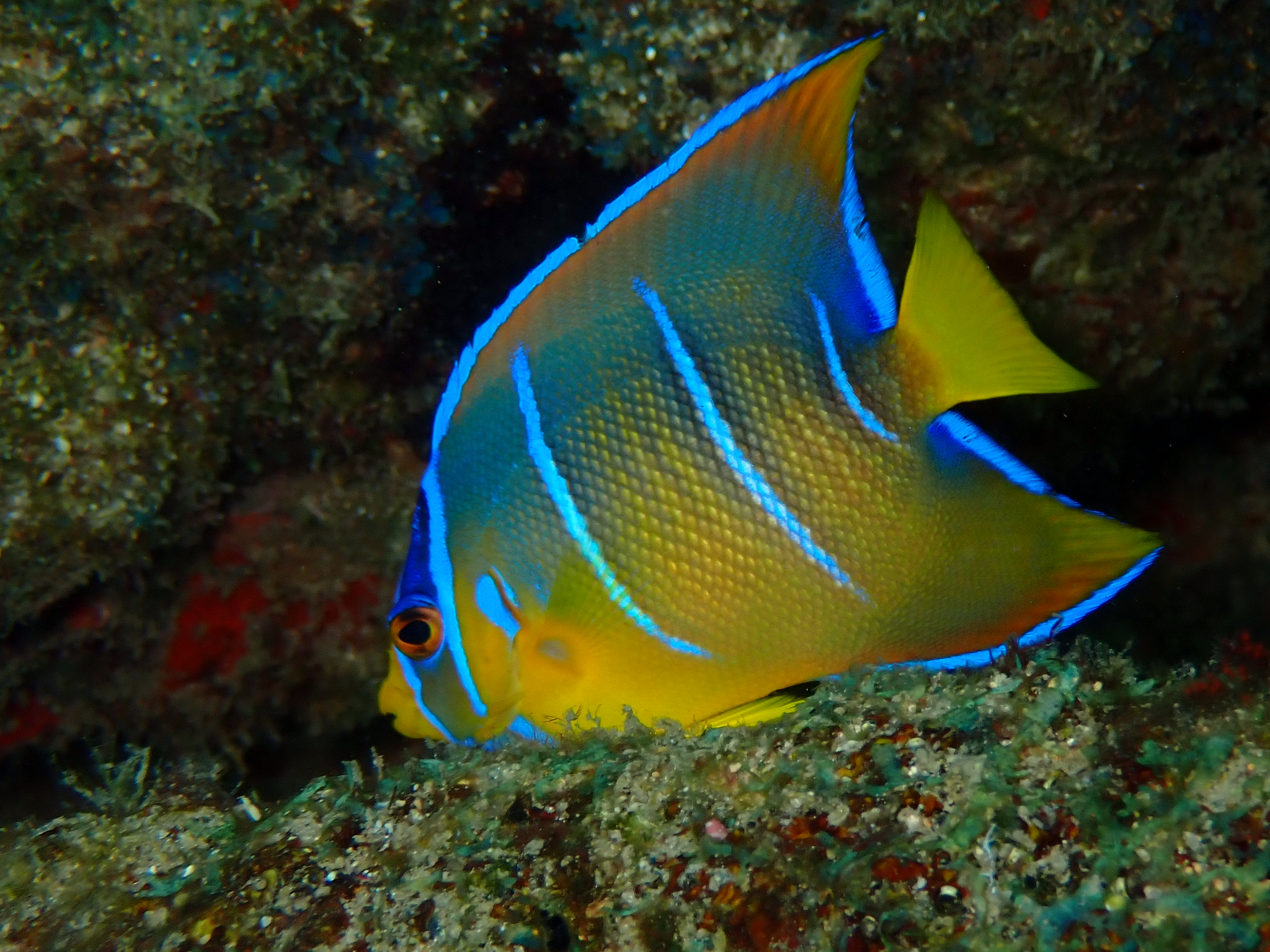
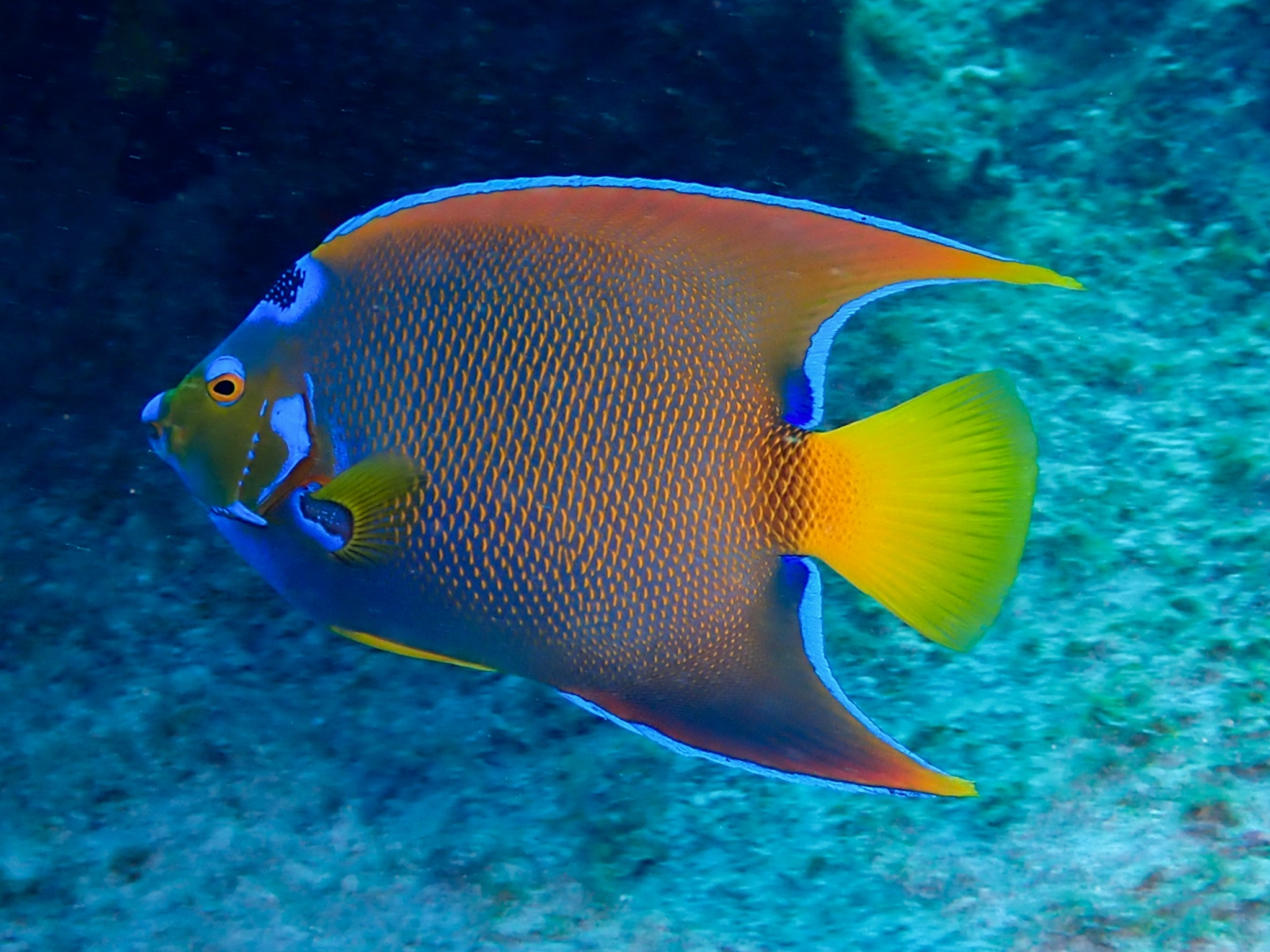
Growth series (from youngest to oldest)

Seven other color morphs have been recorded off the coast of the Saint Peter and Saint Paul Archipelago, Brazil. The most commonly recorded is a mostly gold or bright orange morph. Other morphs may be bright blue with some yellow, black or white coloration or even all white. Another color morph was recorded off Dry Tortugas, Florida, in 2009. This fish was mostly cobalt blue with white and yellow-orange colored areas.

There are records of at least two wild queen angelfish at St. Peter and St. Paul with a "pughead" skeletal deformity, a squashed upper jaw and a lower jaw that sticks out. Such deformities mostly occur in captive fish.

== Ecology ==
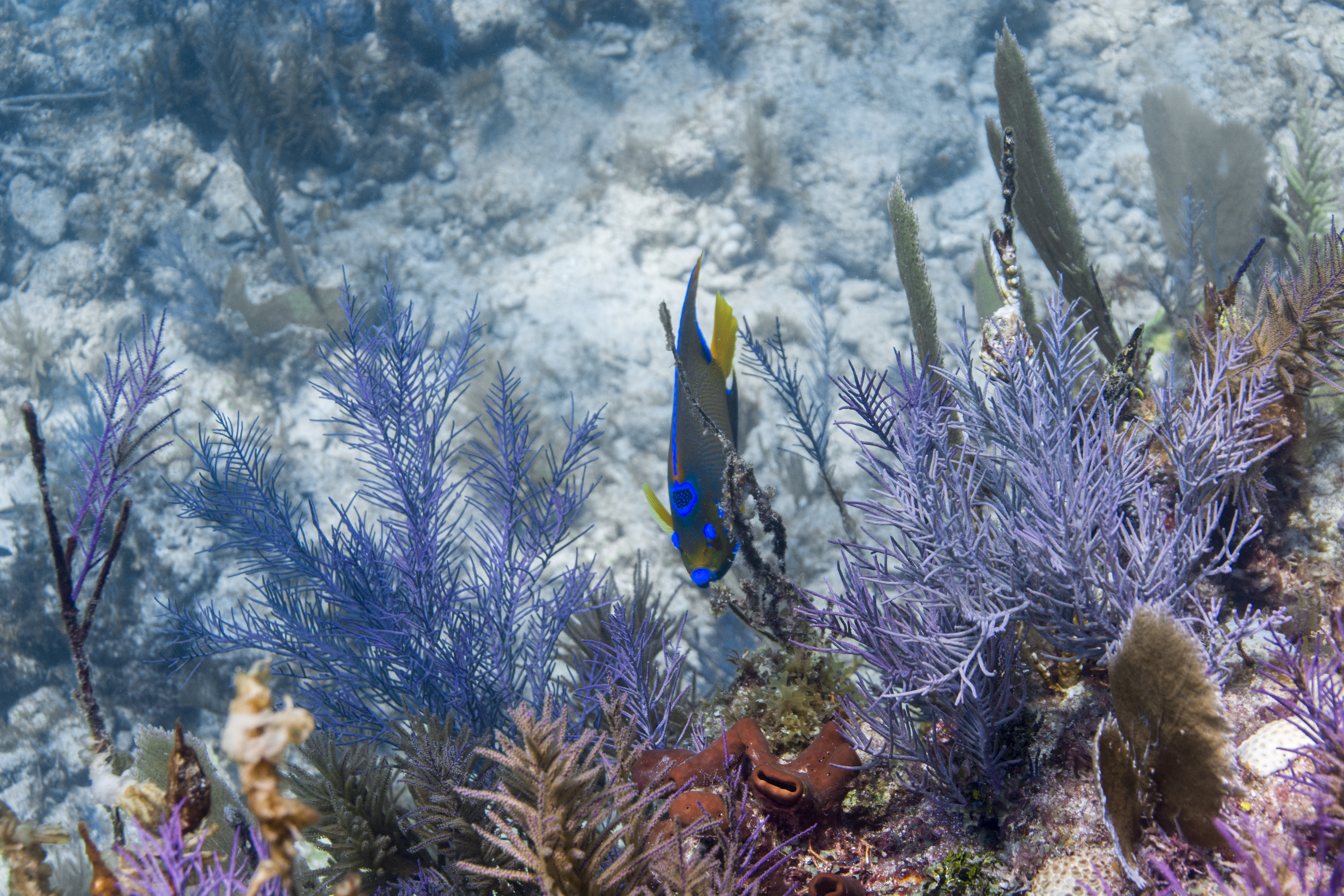
John Pennekamp Coral Reef State Park, Key Largo, Florida

Queen angelfish are found in tropical and subtropical areas of the Western Atlantic Ocean around the coasts and islands of the Americas. They occur from Florida along the Gulf of Mexico and the Caribbean Sea down to Brazil. Their range extends as far east as Bermuda and the Saint Peter and Saint Paul Archipelago. Queen angelfish are benthic or bottom-dwelling and occur from shallow waters close to shore down to 70 m (230 ft). They live in coral reefs, preferring soft corals, and swim either alone or in pairs.

Queen angelfish eat sponges, tunicates, jellyfish, corals, plankton, and algae. Juveniles act as cleaner fish and establish and remove ectoparasites from bigger fish. Off St. Thomas Island and Salvador, Bahia, 90% of the diet of adults is sponges. Off the Saint Peter and Saint Paul Archipelago, more than 30 prey species may be consumed, 68% being sponges, 25% being algae, and 5% being bryozoans. Queen angelfish appear to be selective feeders as the proportion of prey in their diet does not correlate with their abundance. On the species level, the angelfish of the Saint Peter and Saint Paul Archipelago target the less common sponges Geodia neptuni, Erylus latens, Clathria calla, and Asteropus niger.

== Life cycle ==
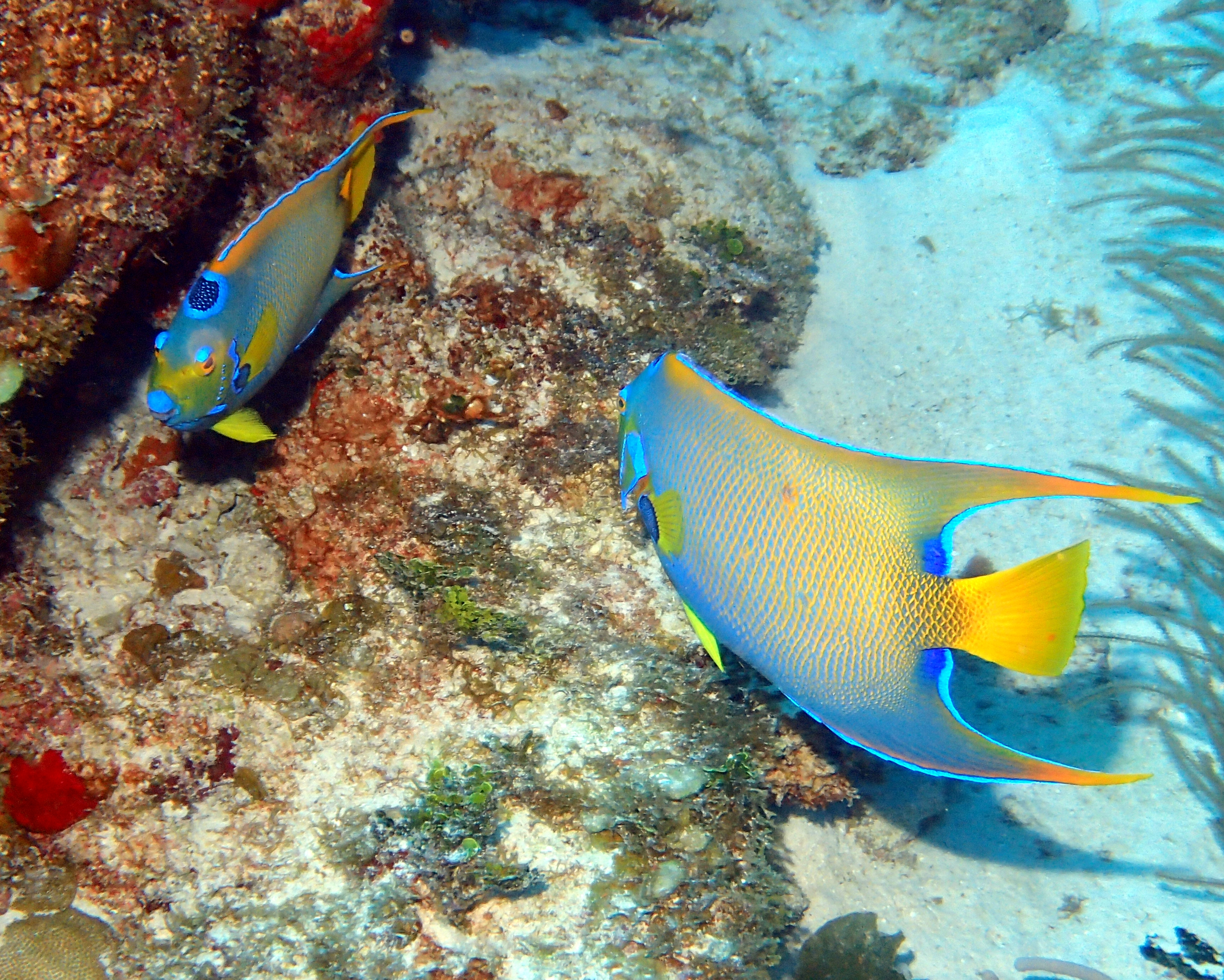
Belize

Male queen angelfish have large territories with a harem of two to four females. Little is known about the sexual development of the species, though they are presumed to be protogynous hermaphrodites. The largest harem female may transform into a male if the territorial male disappears. Around midday, the females forage individually in different locations. The male tends to each of them, rushing at, circling, and feeding next to them. Spawning in this species occurs year-round. It is observed sometime around a full moon.

Courtship involves the male showing his side to the female and flicking his pectoral fins at her or "soaring" above them. At the beginning of spawning, the female swims towards the surface with the male swimming under her with his snout pressing against her vent. They then deposit their eggs and semen into the water. The female discharges between 25 and 75 thousand eggs a day. After spawning, the pair split and head to back to the ocean floor.

The transparent eggs are pelagic and remain suspended in the water for 15–20 hours. The hatched larvae have a large yolk sac with no functional eyes, gut or fins, but two days later, the yolk is absorbed, and the larvae have more of a resemblance to fish. These larvae are plankton-eaters and grow quickly. Between the ages of three and four weeks old, when they have reached a length of 15 to 20 mm (0.6 to 0.8 in), they descend to the floor as juveniles. Juvenile angelfish live alone and in territories encompassing finger sponges and coral, where they establish cleaning stations for other fish.

== Human interactions ==
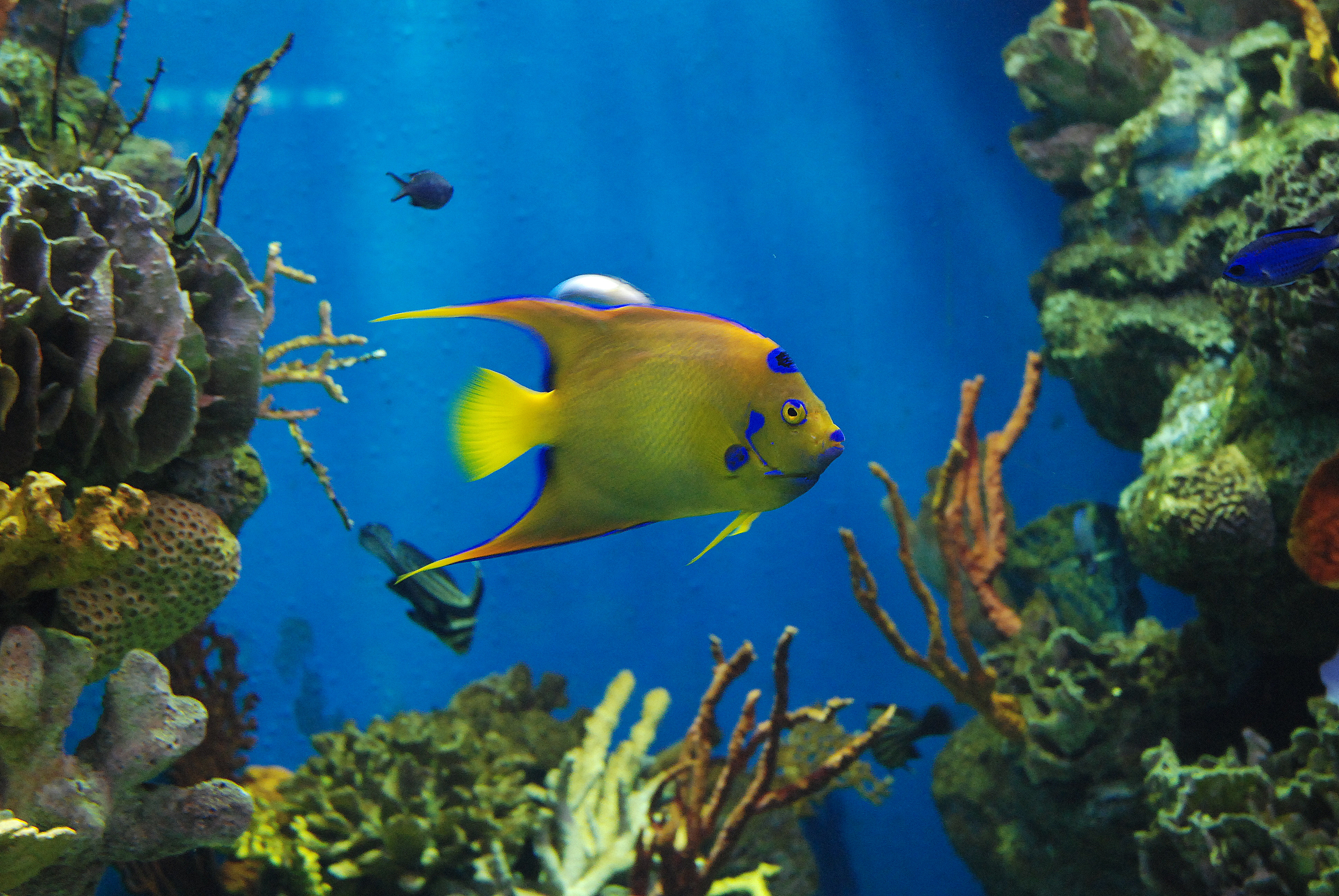
Aquarium in Barcelona, Spain

Queen angelfish are not normally eaten or commercially fished. They are captured mostly for the aquarium trade, where they are highly valued. As juveniles, angelfish can adapt to eating typical aquarium food and hence have a higher survival rate than individuals taken as adults, which require a more specialized diet.

In Brazil, the queen angelfish is the most common marine ornamental fish sold aboard. From 1995 to 2000, 43,730 queen angelfish were traded at Fortaleza in the northeast of the country, and in 1995, 75% of marine fish sold were both queen and French angelfish. In 2010, the queen angelfish was assessed as least concern by the International Union for Conservation of Nature, as the species is only significantly fished off Brazil and the wild population appeared to be secure.

Queen angelfish have been caught in the eastern Adriatic Sea, off Croatia, in 2011, and the Mediterranean Sea, off Malta, in 2020. These are likely introductions from the aquarium industry and not natural colonizations. In 2015, an aquarium-introduced angelfish was found in the Red Sea at Eilat's Coral Beach, Israel. Its kidney was infected with the disease-causing bacterium Photobacterium damselae piscicida, which was not previously recorded in Red Sea fish, raising concerns that it could infect native fish.
