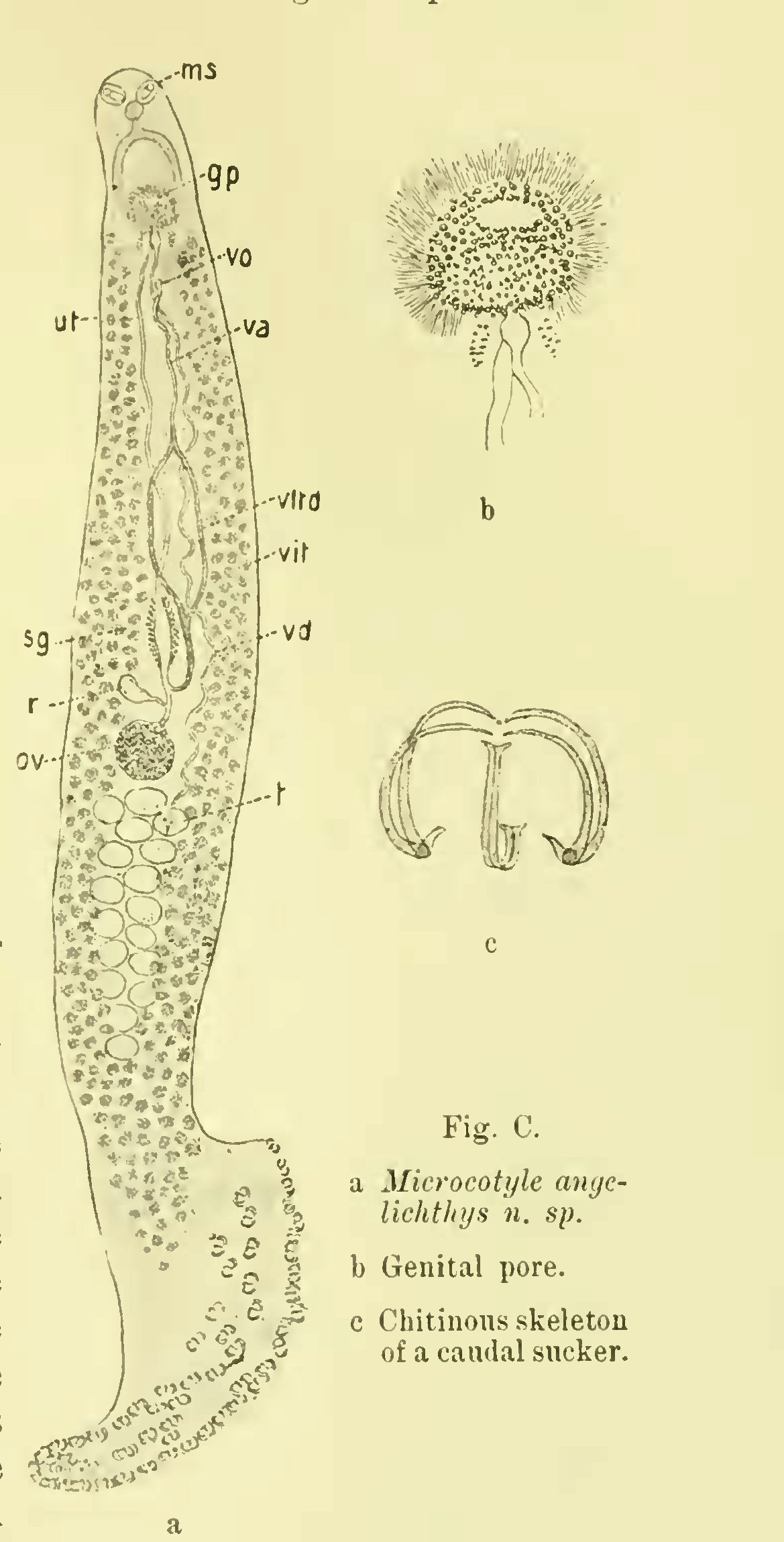
- Microcotyle angelichthys, original description

Scientific classification
- Kingdom: Animalia
- Phylum: Platyhelminthes
- Class: Monogenea
- Order: Mazocraeidea
- Family: Microcotylidae
- Genus: Microcotyle
- Species: M. angelichthys

Binomial name
- Microcotyle angelichthys MacCallum, 1913

Synonyms
- Microcotyle (Microcotyle) angelichthys (MacCallum, 1913) Tripathi, 1956; Microcotyle (Microcotyle) angelichthys (MacCallum, 1913)

= Microcotyle angelichthys =

Species of worms

Microcotyle angelichthys is a species of monogenean, parasitic on the gills of a marine fish. It belongs to the family Microcotylidae.

== Systematics ==
Microcotyle angelichthys was described by MacCallum in 1913 from the gills of Holacanthus ciliaris (Pomacanthidae ) collected at New York Aquarium. Tripathi (1956) created the new subgenus Microcotyle in which he placed M. angelichthys. As Tripathi (1956) listed species within each subgenus in alphabetical order, without designating a type species, his subgeneric names and grouping were considered invalid. Unnithan (1971) placed M. angelichthys in the nominal subgenus Microcotyle as Microcotyle (Microcotyle) angelichthys.

== Description ==
Microcotyle angelichthys has the general morphology of all species of Microcotyle, with a small symmetrical body, comprising an anterior part which contains most organs and a posterior part called the haptor. The haptor is symmetrical, and bears 40-60 clamps, arranged as two rows, one on each side. The clamps of the haptor attach the animal to the gill of the fish. There are also two buccal suckers at the anterior extremity, provided with a central partition. The digestive organs include an anterior, terminal mouth, a large pharynx with a delicate structure, a short oesophagus which divides in front of the genital pore and a posterior intestine with two lateral branches provided with numerous secondary branches. Each adult contains male and female reproductive organs. The reproductive organs include an anterior genital atrium opening near the anterior end of the body, thickly armed with numerous spines, a medio-dorsal vagina, a single ovary consisting of a more or less globular mass and 18-20 relatively large testes which are posterior to the ovary.

== Hosts and localities ==
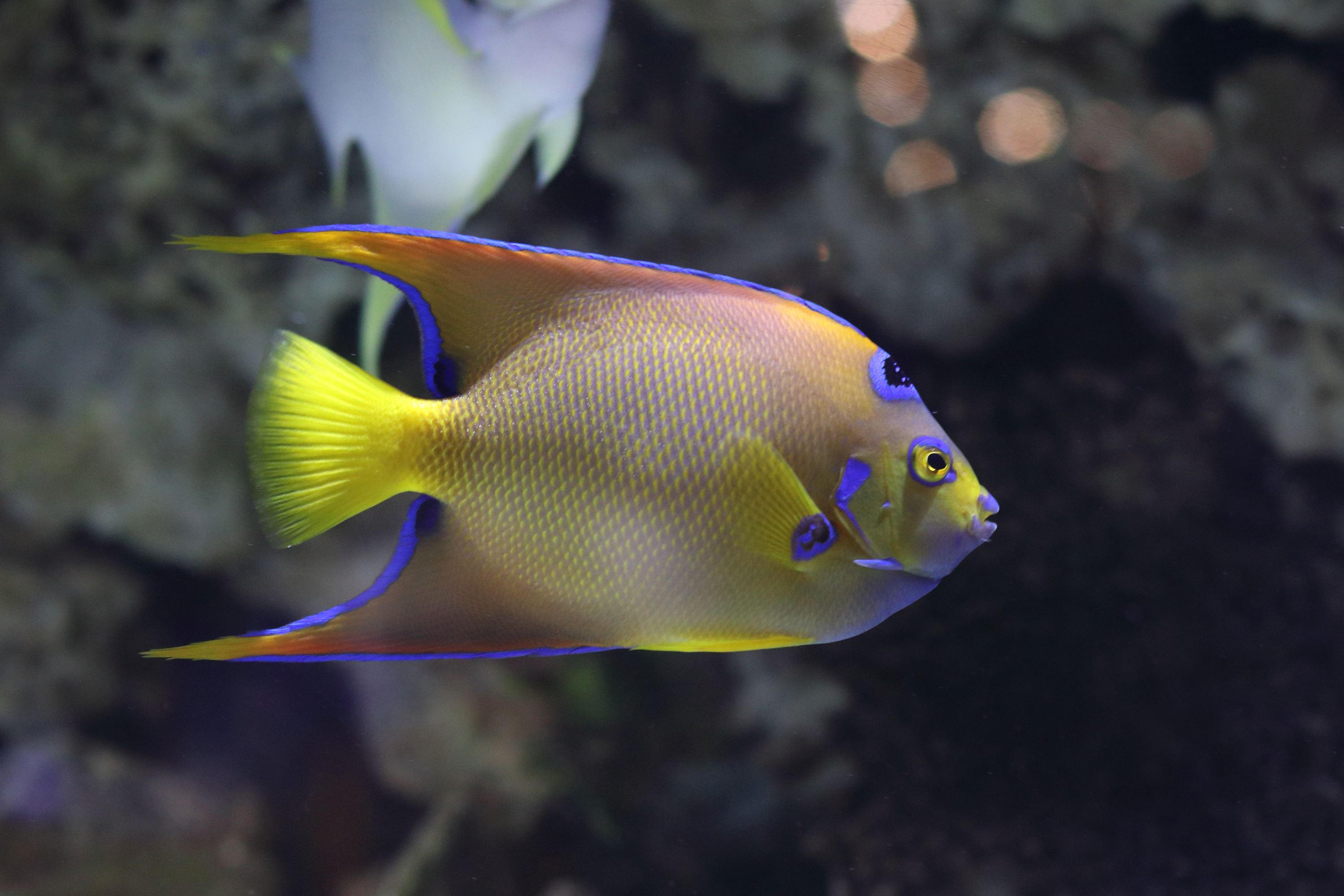
The Angel fish, Holacanthus ciliaris is the host of Microcotyle angelichthys

The host-type is the Angel fish, Holacanthus ciliaris (Pomacanthidae ). The type-locality if the New York Aquarium.

== Pathology ==
MacCallum (1913) stated that the number of Microcotyle angelichthys on Holacanthus ciliaris, varying from a few to many thousands, caused the death of the host.
