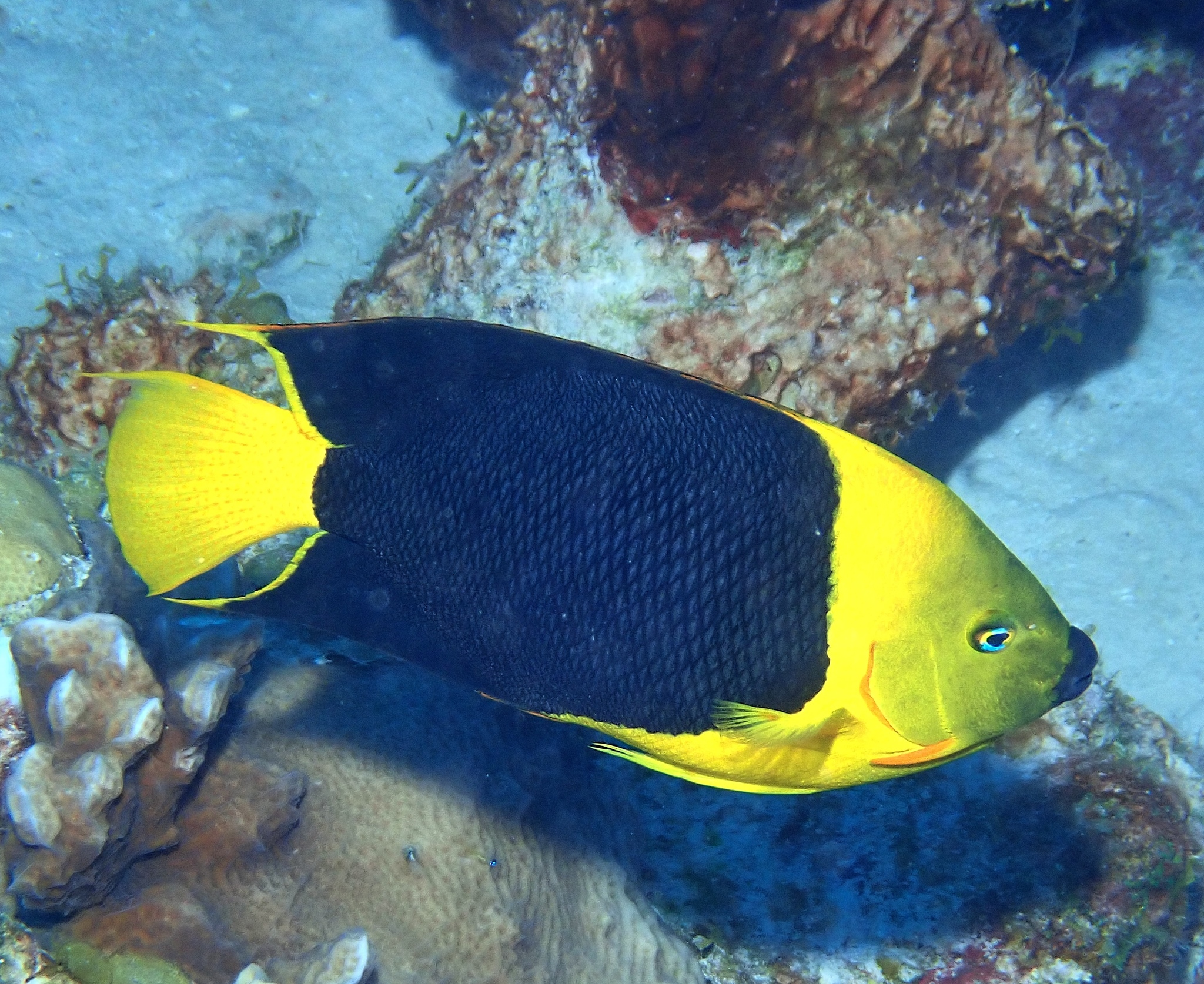
- Rock beauty angelfish (Holacanthus tricolor)

Scientific classification
- Kingdom: Animalia
- Phylum: Chordata
- Class: Actinopterygii
- Division: Teleostei
- Order: Acanthuriformes
- Family: Pomacanthidae
- Genus: Holacanthus; Lacépède, 1802

Type species
- Chaetodon tricolor Bloch, 1795

Species
- 7, see text.

Synonyms
- Angelichthys Jordan & Evermann, 1896; Pomacanthodes Gill, 1862

= Holacanthus =

Genus of fishes

Holacanthus, from Ancient Greek ὅλος (hólos), meaning "full", and ἄκανθα (ákantha), meaning "spine", is a genus of marine angelfishes (family Pomacanthidae). The eight species are particularly abundant near volcanic rocks and coral islands. Some are highly valued as food, but even more so for aquaria, as all are brightly colored.

== Species ==
The following species are classified within the genus Holacanthus:

Image	Scientific name	Common name	Distribution
	H. africanus Cadenat, 1951	Guinean angelfish	coast of tropical West Africa, in the warmer sections of the eastern Atlantic Ocean.
	H. bermudensis Goode, 1876	Bermuda blue angelfish	western Atlantic from North Carolina to Bermuda, into the Bahamas and Florida to the Gulf of Mexico, and also to Yucatán, Mexico.
	H. ciliaris (Linnaeus, 1758)	Queen angelfish	Florida Keys, and also the Bahamas and the Gulf of Mexico
	H. clarionensis Gilbert, 1891	Clarion angelfish	Pacific coast of Mexico
	H. limbaughi Baldwin, 1963	Clipperton angelfish	Pacific – eastern central
	H. passer Valenciennes, 1846	King angelfish	eastern Pacific Ocean from the coast of Peru north to the California gulf, including offshore islands as far west as the Galapagos,
	H. tricolor (Bloch, 1795)	Rock beauty angelfish	tropical western Atlantic Ocean to the northern Gulf of Mexico
