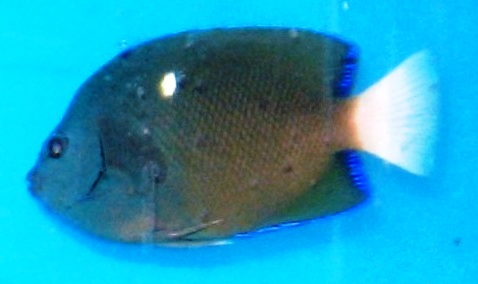

Conservation status
- Near Threatened (IUCN 3.1)

Scientific classification
- Kingdom: Animalia
- Phylum: Chordata
- Class: Actinopterygii
- Order: Acanthuriformes
- Family: Pomacanthidae
- Genus: Holacanthus
- Species: H. limbaughi

Binomial name
- Holacanthus limbaughi Baldwin, 1963

= Clipperton angelfish =

Species of fish

The Clipperton angelfish (Holacanthus limbaughi) is a species of marine ray-finned fish, a marine angelfish belonging to the family Pomacanthidae. It is endemic to Clipperton Island, a French possession in the eastern Pacific Ocean.

== Description ==
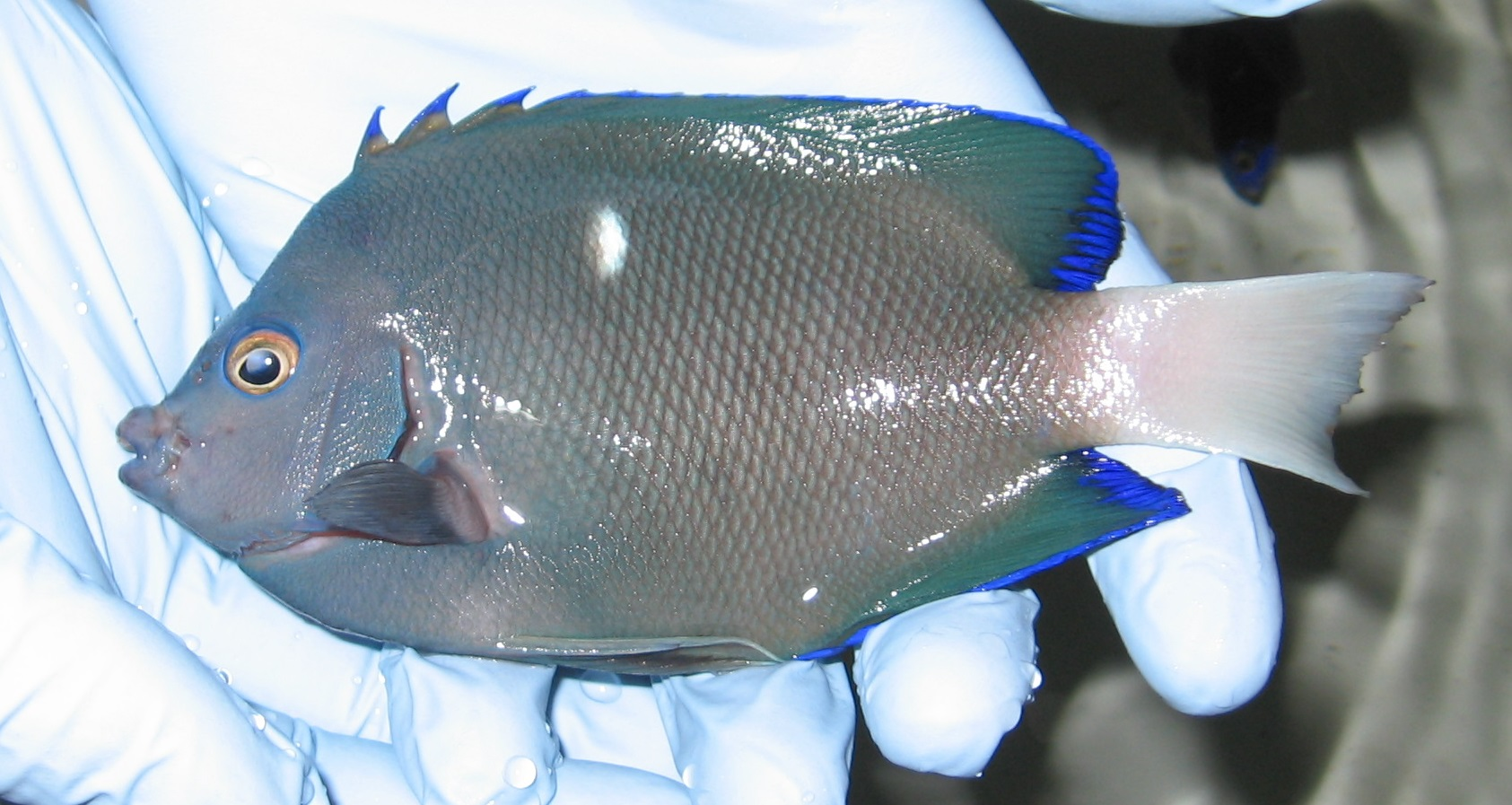
Holacanthus limbaughi

The Clipperton angelfish has a deep, laterally compressed body. It has a small mouth that has bristle-like teeth. The preoperculum has a sizeable spine at its corner and a serrated rear margin while there are 4 spines between the preoperculum and the operculum. The juveniles are a dark bluish-grey on their bodies, which is marked with a number of vertical blue bars, 2 on the head and 5 on the flanks, these fade as they mature into adults. They also have a white spot on the upper side and white caudal and pectoral fins. The adults are similar, lacking the barring, and have vivid blue margins to the dorsal, anal and pelvic fins. The dorsal fin contains 14 spines and 17-18 soft rays while the anal fin has 3 spines and 17-18 soft rays. This species attains a maximum total length of 30 centimetres (12 in).

== Distribution ==
The Clipperton angelfish is endemic to the waters of the French overseas territory of Clipperton Island, which is 2,560 kilometres (1,590 miles) west of Costa Rica, in the Eastern Pacific Ocean.

== Habitat and biology ==
The Clipperton angelfish is found at depths between 6 and 100 metres (20 and 328 ft). Very little is known about its habitat preferences and biology.

== Systematics ==
The Clipperton angelfish was first formally described in 1963 by the American ichthyologist Wayne J. Baldwin. The specific name honours the American scuba diver, zoologist and underwater photographer Conrad Limbaugh (1925–1960) who played a vital role in the collection of the type.

== Utilisation ==
The Clipperton angelfish has such a remote and restricted distribution that it is extremely scarce in the aquarium trade. When it has appeared in that trade it has commanded very high prices. In 2009, a California tropical fish dealer was caught trying to bring 52 illegally collected Clipperton angelfish into the United States, falsely declaring them as king angelfish to federal wildlife authorities. He intended to sell the fish for $10,000 each.
