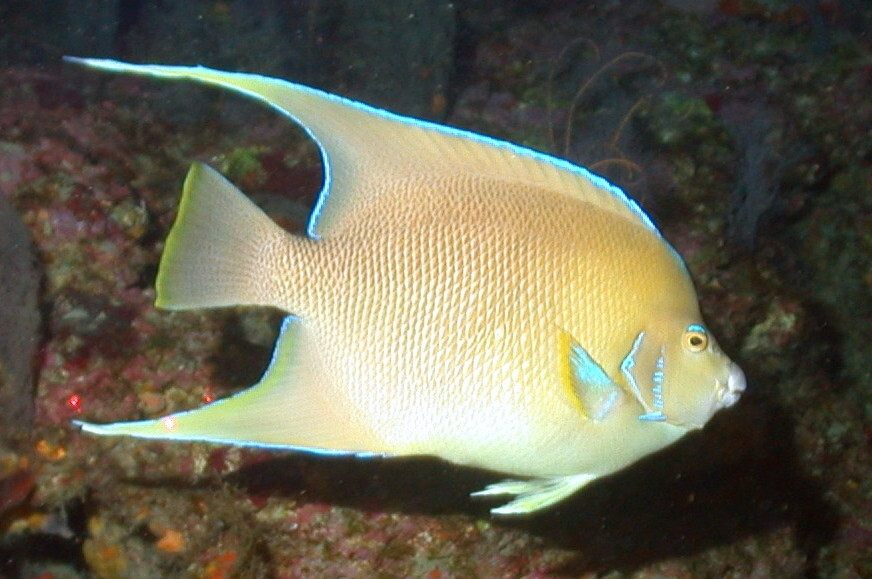

Conservation status
- Least Concern (IUCN 3.1)

Scientific classification
- Kingdom: Animalia
- Phylum: Chordata
- Class: Actinopterygii
- Order: Acanthuriformes
- Family: Pomacanthidae
- Genus: Holacanthus
- Species: H. bermudensis

Binomial name
- Holacanthus bermudensis (Goode, 1876)
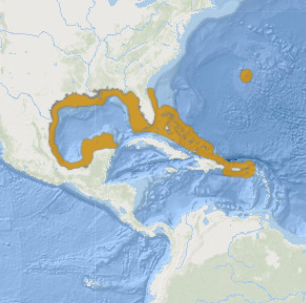

Synonyms
- Holacanthus ciliaris bermudensis Goode, 1876; Angelichthys isabelita Jordan & Rutter, 1898; Holacanthus isabelita (Jordan & Rutter, 1898)

= Holacanthus bermudensis =

Species of fish

Holacanthus bermudensis, also known as the blue angelfish or Bermuda blue angelfish, is a species of ray-finned fish, a marine angelfish belonging to the family Pomacanthidae. It occurs in the western Atlantic Ocean.

== Taxonomy ==
Holacanthus bermudensis was first formally described as Holacanthus ciliaris bermudensis in 1876 by the American ichthyologist George Brown Goode (1851–1896). The original type specimens from Bermuda, the syntypes, were set aside and replaced by a neotype, which was the holotype of Angelichthys isabelita which had been described by David Starr Jordan and Cloudsley Louis Ritter with the type locality given as Key West in Florida. This is set out in the Official List of Specific Names in Zoology (ICZN, Opinion 2003). This species frequently hybridises with the sympatric queen angelfish (Holacanthus ciliaris). H. isabelita was formerly considered to be a separate species but is now regarded as a synonym of H. bermudensis.

== Description ==
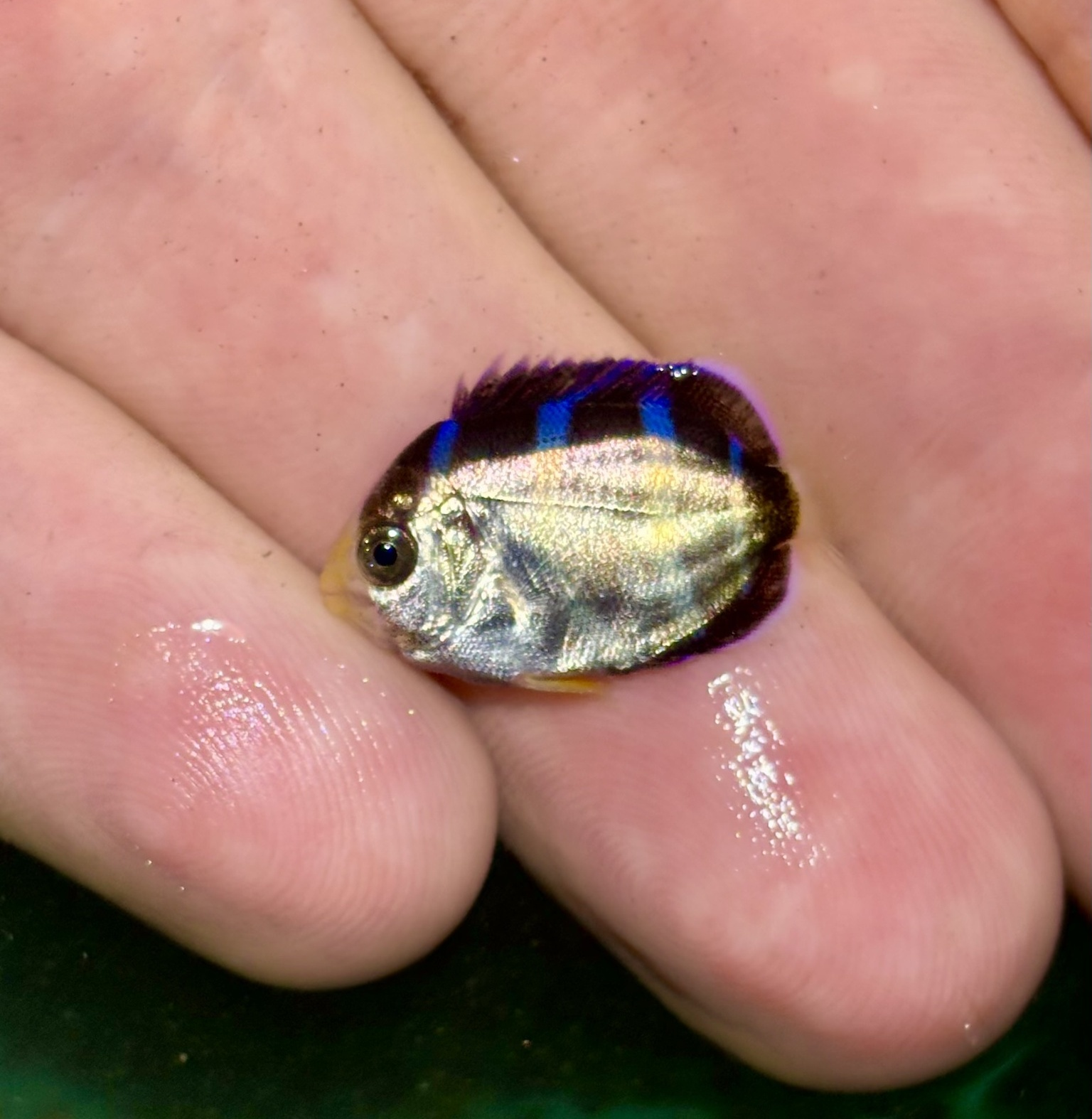
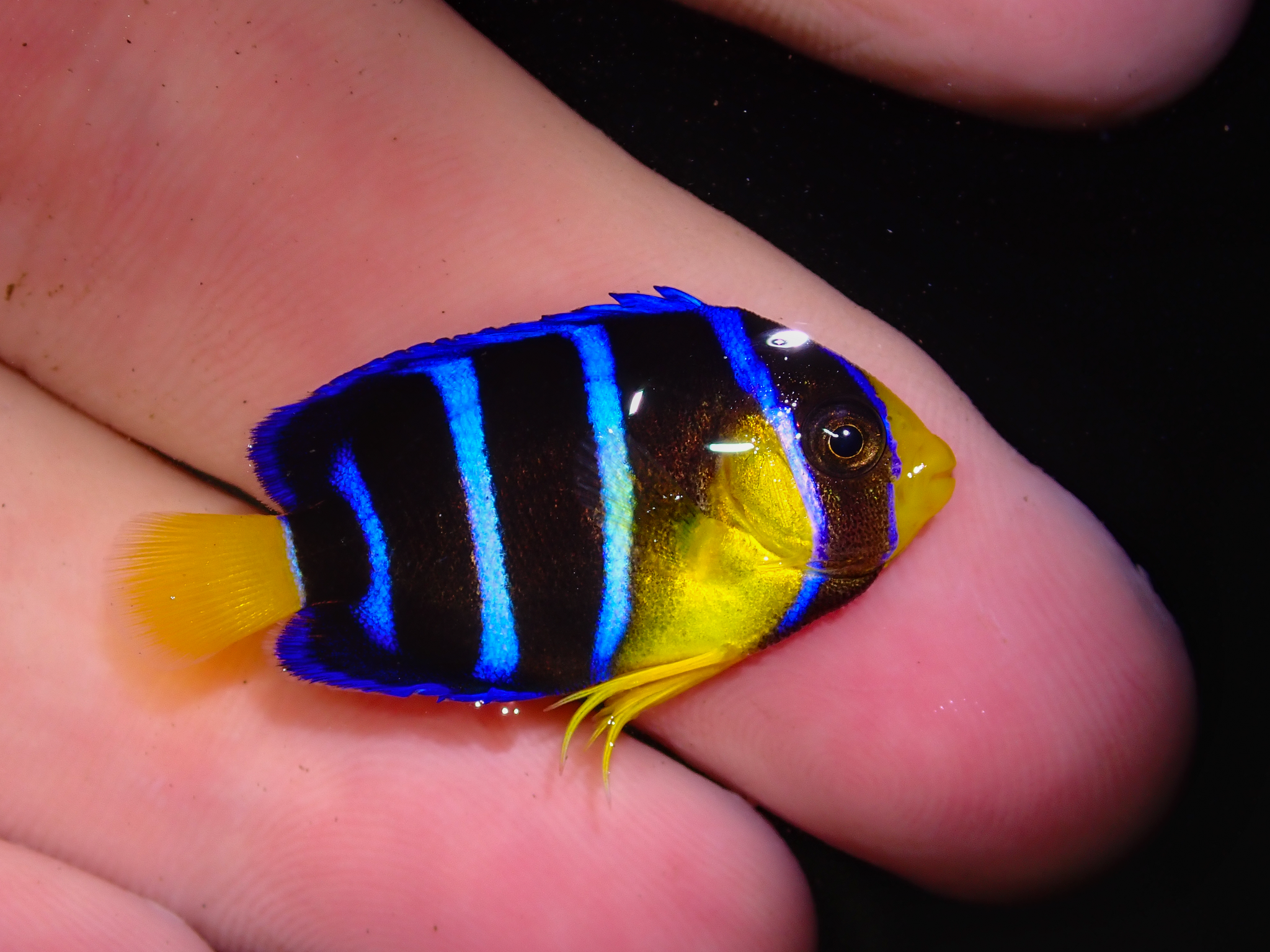
Young juveniles

Holacanthus bermudensis has a deep, oval-shaped body that is strongly lateral compressed. It has a short snout with a small mouth that contains small teeth, like the bristles of a brush.

The juveniles are yellowish on the anterior part of the body changing to brownish-yellow halfway along. They have a vivid yellow caudal, pectoral and pelvic fins. They also have a number of vertical white bars on the body with bright blue margins to the dorsal and anal fins. The adults are bluish yellowish on the body with a vivid yellow face. They have blue highlights on the chest and forehead and blue and yellow pectoral fins while the caudal fin has yellow margins. The dorsal and anal fins also have yellow margins and long yellow streamers. The dorsal fin contains 15 spines and 19–21 soft rays while the anal fin has 3 spines and 20–21 soft rays. This species attains a maximum total length of 45 centimetres (18 in).

== Ecology ==
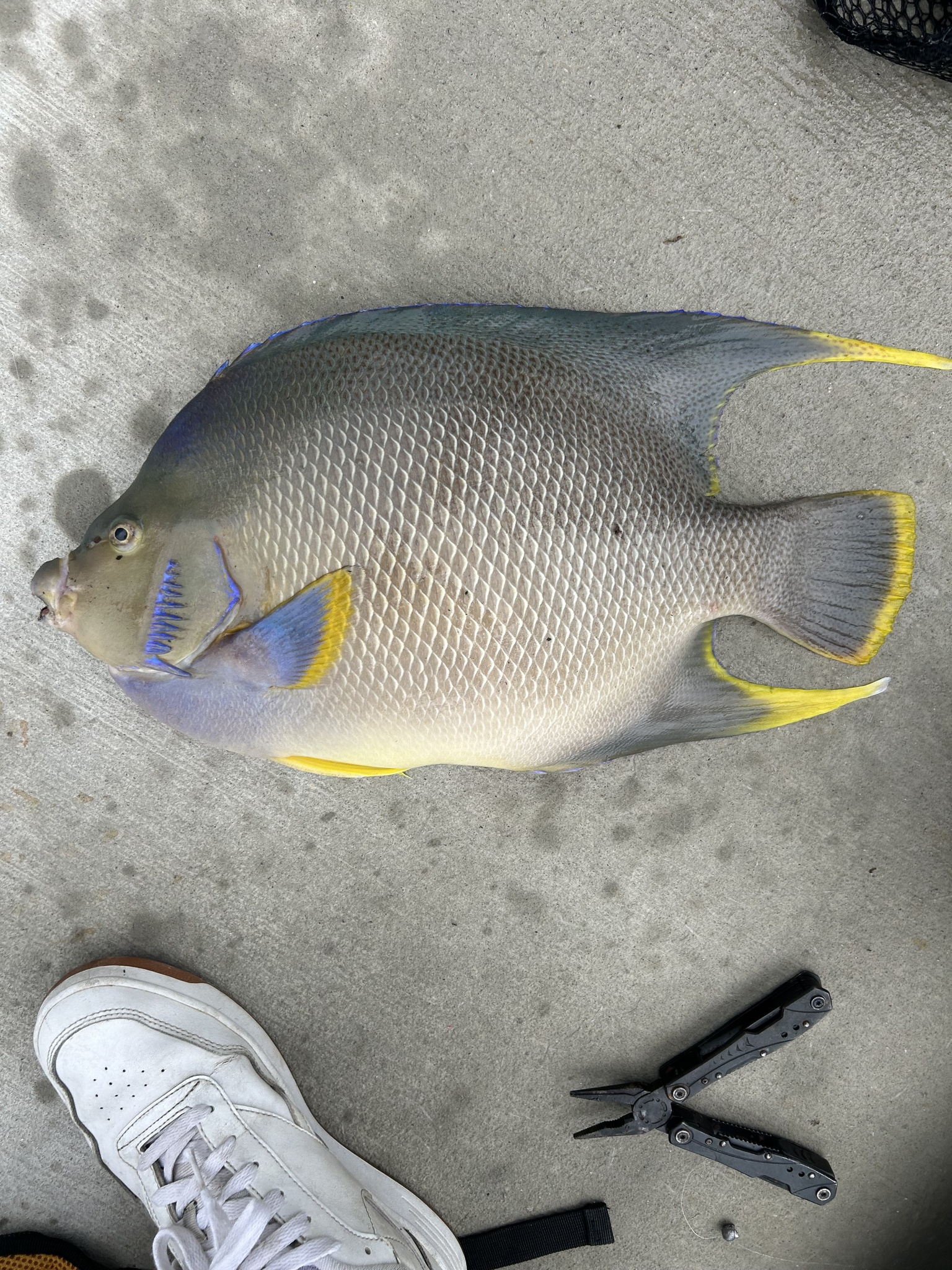
Adult, in Florida

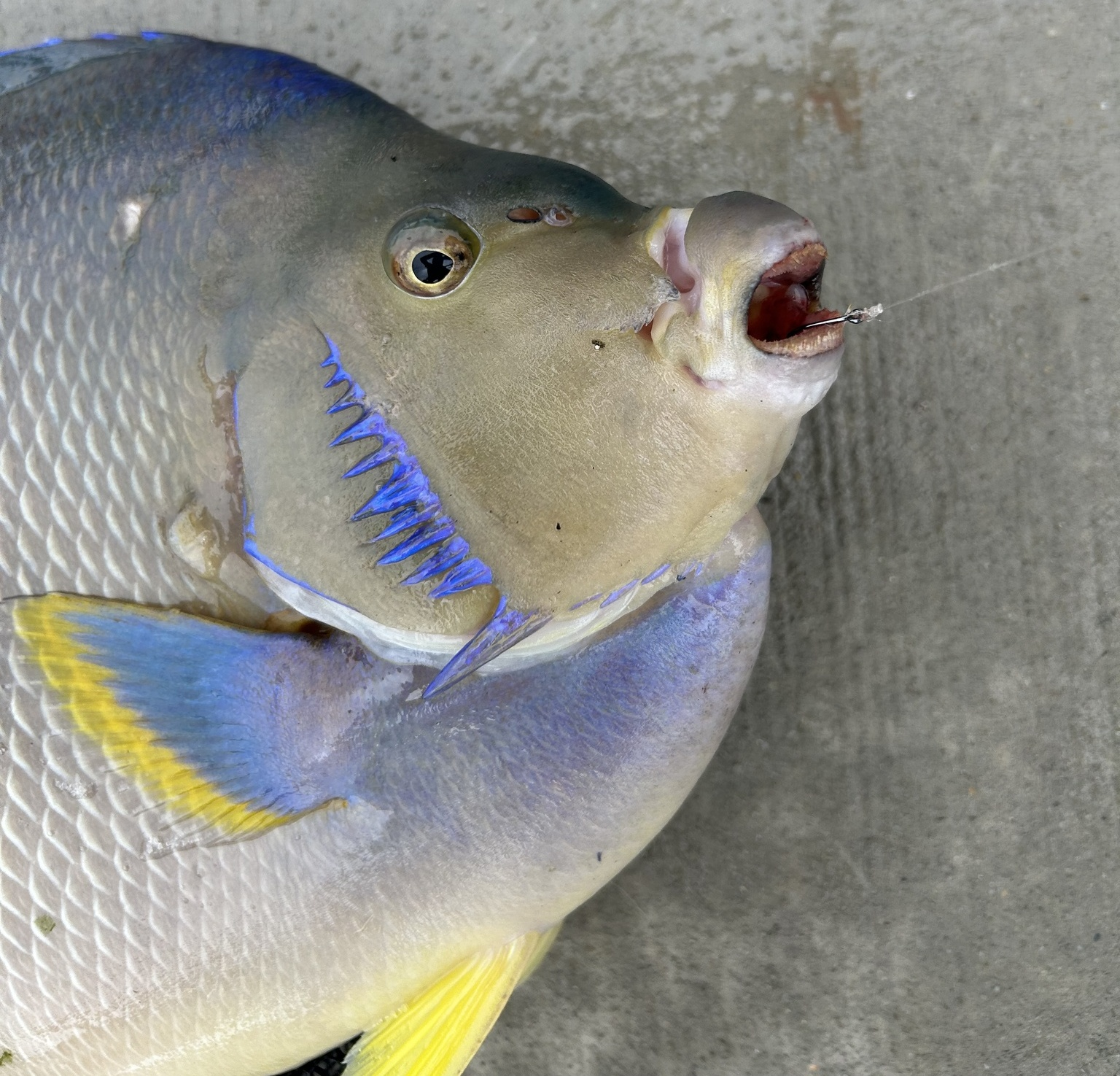
Showing teeth

Holacanthus bermudensis is found in the western Atlantic from North Carolina to Bermuda, into the Bahamas and Florida to the Gulf of Mexico, and also to Yucatan, Mexico in the west and east to Puerto Rico and the Virgin Islands.

Holacanthus bermudensis is a benthic species, living close to the seabed where there are areas of sponges, coral, or rock at depths between 2 and 93 metres (6.6 and 305.1 ft). It is a diurnal species, active in daylight and hiding within the reef at night. Juveniles prefer more sheltered area such as bays, channels, and inshore reefs.

This species has a diet that comprises largely of sponges although they have been occasionally recorded feeding on tunicates, corals, and algae. The juveniles act as cleaner fish, feeding on the ectoparasites picked from the skin of other fishes visiting communal cleaning stations. They have the ability to produce loud thumping sounds which are thought to startle predators and draw the attention of conspecifics.

== Breeding ==
The adults of the blue angelfish are usually encountered in pairs and they remain in these pairs all year. This has been interpreted as meaning that they are monogamous. When breeding they spawn by slowly swimming upwards in the water column, moving their abdomens together, and releasing copious amounts of ova and milt. The female may lay between 25 and 75 thousand eggs at a time and up to 10 million eggs in each spawning season. Each of the transparent, pelagic eggs contains a small quantity of oil as a buoyancy aid.

The eggs take 15 to 20 hours to hatch, the hatchlings being a type of pre-larval stage which is attached to a large yolk sac but which has no functioning fins, eyes or gut. After around 48 hours the yolk is absorbed, while it is absorbed the pro-large changes into a true larvae and commences eating plankton. Subsequent growth is quick and in the 3 to 4 weeks following their hatching they settle on the seabed. Juveniles are highly territorial, they defend territories where they have established a cleaning station. It is thought that the vivid, contrasting colours of the juveniles may indicate the establishment of a cleaning station to potential clients.

== Utilisation ==
Holacanthus bermudensis isn't important commercially, but it is common in the aquarium trade.
