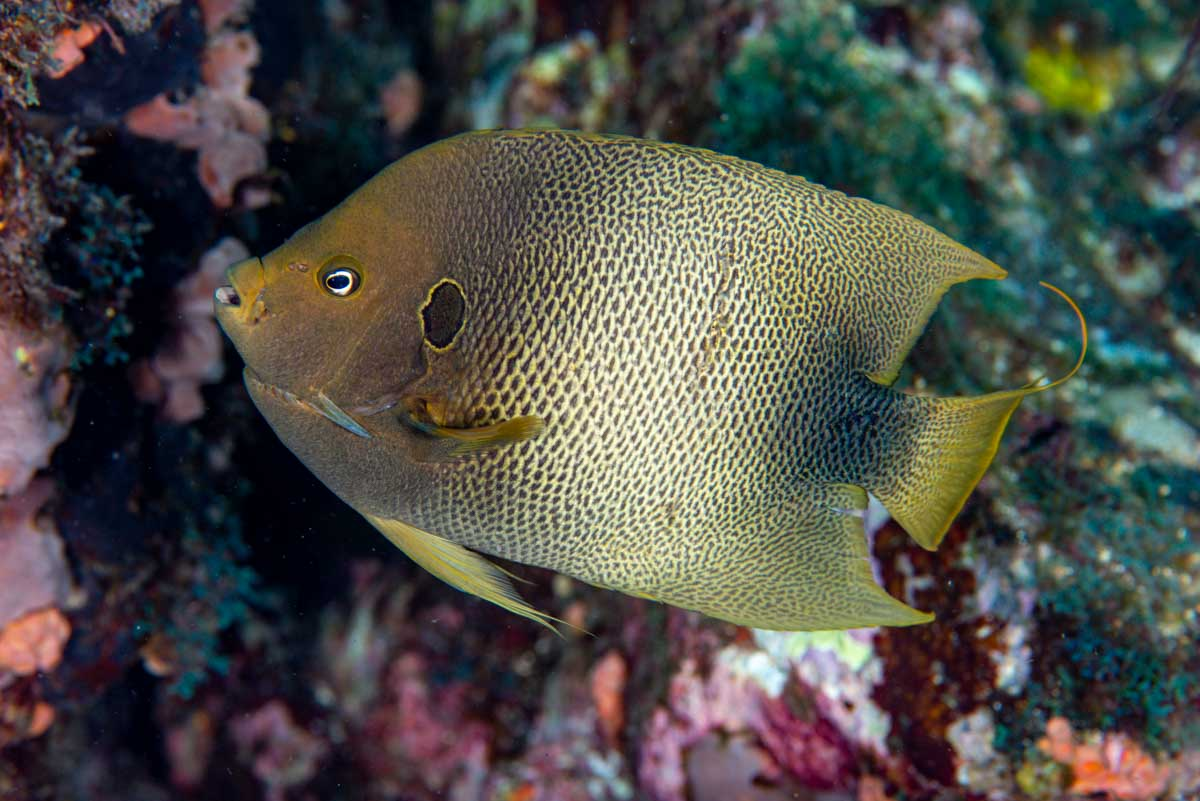

Conservation status
- Least Concern (IUCN 3.1)

Scientific classification
- Kingdom: Animalia
- Phylum: Chordata
- Class: Actinopterygii
- Order: Acanthuriformes
- Family: Pomacanthidae
- Genus: Holacanthus
- Species: H. africanus

Binomial name
- Holacanthus africanus Cadenat, 1951

= Holacanthus africanus =

Species of fish

Holacanthus africanus, the Guinean angelfish or West African angelfish, is species of marine ray-finned fish, a marine angelfish belonging to the family Pomacanthidae. It is found in the warmer sections of the eastern Atlantic Ocean off the coast of West Africa.

== Description ==
Holocanthus africanus is differently coloured in juveniles and adults. The juvenile Guinean angelfish has a dark blue body with thin light blue vertical bars on either side of the eye. They also have a yellow caudal fin and yellow lips with a broad vertical white band in the middle of their flanks. As is they mature, the blue changes to olive green, with the white vertical bar on the flanks widening and becoming more yellowish. They also gain an almost black colour on the caudal peduncle. They may retain yellow areas along the margins of the dorsal and anal fins, and there is a dark ocellus visible behind the operculum. This species attains a maximum total length of 45 centimetres (18 in).

== Distribution ==
Holacanthus africanus is found from Senegal to the Congo River estuary, including the Cape Verde and São Tomé islands. It has been reported for the first time in the Mediterranean Sea in Valletta harbour, Malta in 2017.

== Habitat and biology ==
Holacanthus africanus is found in clear water over rocky reefs at depths between 1 and 40 metres (3 and 131 ft). The Guinean angelfish has a non-specialized diet. It feeds primarily on sponges, but also on tunicates, jellyfish, and soft corals as well as algae and plankton. Around the Cape Verde islands, this species is often found in quite dense mixed species shoals, the Guinean angelfish being dominant.

== Systematics ==
Holacanthus africanus was first formally described in 1951 by the French ichthyologist Jean Cadenat (1908–1992) with the type locality given as Gorée in Senegal.

== Utilisation ==
Holacanthus africanus does appear in the aquarium trade, albeit only a few times annually and it commands high prices. Availability increased in the late 2010s.
