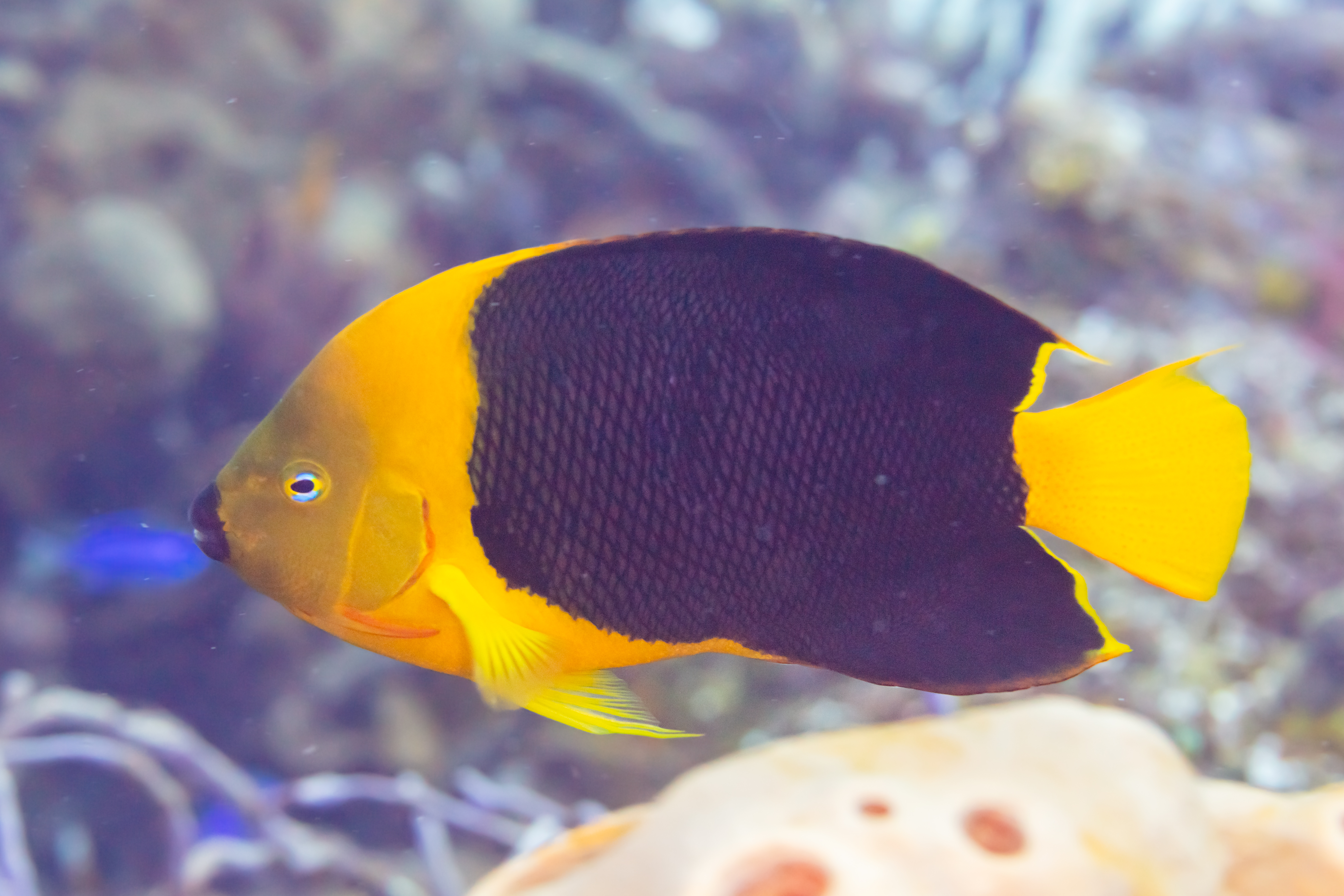

Conservation status
- Least Concern (IUCN 3.1)

Scientific classification
- Kingdom: Animalia
- Phylum: Chordata
- Class: Actinopterygii
- Order: Acanthuriformes
- Family: Pomacanthidae
- Genus: Holacanthus
- Species: H. tricolor

Binomial name
- Holacanthus tricolor (Bloch, 1795)

Synonyms
- Chaetodon tricolor Bloch, 1795; Pomacanthus tricolor (Bloch, 1795)

= Rock beauty =

Species of fish

The rock beauty (Holacanthus tricolor), also known as corn sugar, coshubba, rock beasty, catalineta or yellow nanny, is a species of marine ray-finned fish in the angelfish family Pomacanthidae. It is found in the western Atlantic Ocean.

== Etymology ==
The generic name Holacanthus comes from Ancient Greek ὅλος (hólos), meaning "full", and ἄκανθα (ákantha), meaning "spine"; the allusion was not explained by Lacépède, who erected the genus in 1802. The specific name tricolor means "three-colored" in Latin, and refers to the fact that adult rock beauties are predominantly yellow, black and red (the red coloration is, however, not prominent, as it only appears on some fins and the operculum margin of certain specimens).

== Taxonomy ==
The rock beauty was first formally described in 1795 as Chaetodon tricolor by the German physician and naturalist Marcus Elieser Bloch (1723–1799) with the type locality given as Brazil. When Lacépède erected the genus Holacanthus, he moved Chaetodon tricolor to this new genus; in was then designated as the type species of Holacanthus by Desmarest in 1856. Some authorities split Holacanthus into two subgenera; this classification places the rock beauty alone in the subgenus Holacanthus and all other species in the subgenus Angelichthys (which was once an independent genus).

== Description ==
=== Body shape and size ===
The rock beauty has a deep, oval and strongly compressed body, and attains a maximum total length of 30 cm (12 in). It has a short snout, ending in a small mouth equipped with bristle-like teeth. The preoperculum has a large spine at its angle, and its vertical edge is serrated. The bone lying between the preoperclum and the operculum also has 1–4 large spines.

=== Coloration ===
Juveniles are yellowish on their body and fins, with a blue-margined black spot on the upper posterior part of the body. As they mature, the spot grows, eventually covering most of the body, the lower part of the dorsal fin and the upper part of the anal fin. The head and the anterior quarter of the body remain yellow, as do the pectoral, pelvic and caudal fins. The mouth is purple, and the distal edge of the anal fin and the operculum margin are red (or orange). The upper and lower portions of the iris are both vividly blue.

=== Meristics ===
In the dorsal fin of a rock beauty there are 14 spines and 17–19 soft rays, while the anal fin has 3 spines and 18–20 soft rays.

== Distribution ==
The rock beauty is found in the western Atlantic, where it ranges from Bermuda and the waters off Georgia and Florida through the Caribbean Sea and the coasts of South America to as south as Rio de Janeiro. It is uncommon and localized in the Gulf of Mexico, where it only occurs at the Flower Gardens Banks National Marine Sanctuary off Texas and off Veracruz and on the Campeche Bank in Mexico.

== Habitat and biology ==
=== Habitat ===
The rock beauty is found at depths between 3–92 m (10–300 ft). Adults occur around jetties, rocky reefs and coral reefs, while juveniles are often seen in areas of fire coral.

=== Diet ===
Adult rock beauties feed largely on sponges but will also eat corals, zoantharians, bryozoans, gorgonians, tunicates and algae. It is also thought that they consume the mucus secreted by other fish.

=== Reproduction and growth ===
Adult rock beauties are normally encountered as pairs and appear to form long-term monogamous pairs. These pairs frequently consist of a larger individual and a smaller one, possibly indicating sexual dimorphism, although there is no sexual dichromatism. During mating, the pair ascends in the water column with their abdomens close together as they release eggs and milt into the water. A female can lay between 25,000 and 75,000 eggs in an evening, and up to 10 million in a season. The transparent eggs are pelagic and hatch after 15–20 hours. The initial larvae have a large yolk sac and lack functional eyes, gut or fins. After 48 hours, the yolk is absorbed and the larvae have more of a resemblance to normal fish. These larvae feed on plankton and grow rapidly, and after around 3–4 weeks from hatching, they settle on the substrate.

=== Cleaning behavior ===
Unlike some related species, the rock beauty does not act as a cleaner fish.

== Human interactions ==
The rock beauty is one of the more popular Caribbean marine angelfish species in the aquarium trade. The trade was supplied exclusively by wild-caught specimens until captive breeding of this species appeared in the 2020s.
