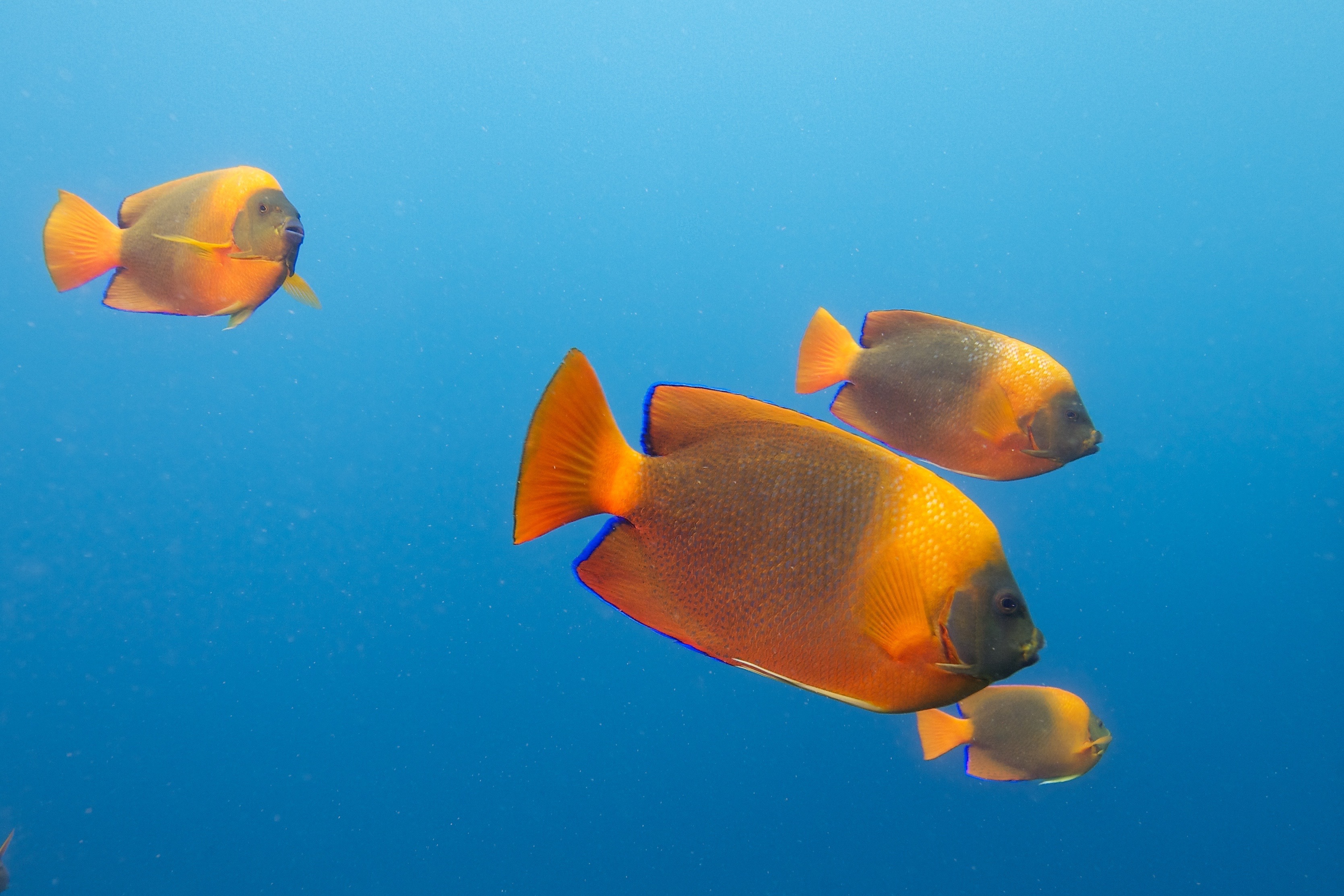
- Holacanthus clarionensis

Conservation status
- Vulnerable (IUCN 3.1)
- CITES Appendix II

Scientific classification
- Kingdom: Animalia
- Phylum: Chordata
- Class: Actinopterygii
- Order: Acanthuriformes
- Family: Pomacanthidae
- Genus: Holacanthus
- Species: H. clarionensis

Binomial name
- Holacanthus clarionensis Gilbert, 1891

= Clarion angelfish =

Species of fish

The Clarion angelfish (Holacanthus clarionensis) is a species of marine ray-finned fish, a marine angelfish belonging to the family Pomacanthidae. It is found in the eastern Pacific Ocean, almost exclusively near islands off the Pacific coast of Mexico.

== Description ==
The Clarion angelfish has a laterally compressed, quadrilateral body. It has a small mouth which is equipped with bristle like teeth. This species attains a maximum total length of 20 centimetres (7.9 in).

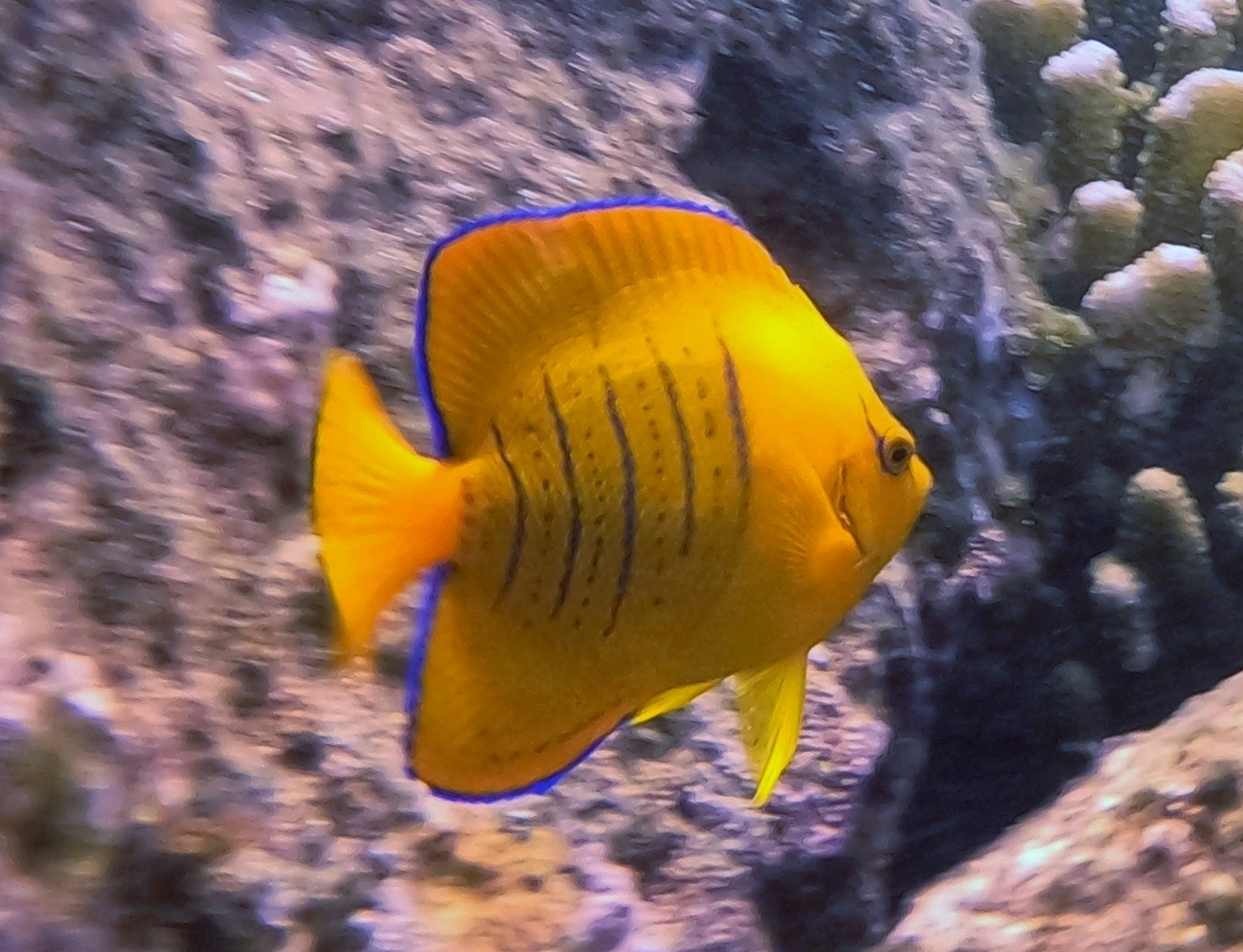
Juvenile

The juveniles have an overall colour of yellowish-orange on the body and fins; the body is marked with a number of blue vertical bars which fade and, eventually, disappear as the fish matures. The juveniles may also have blue lips and blue margins on the dorsal and anal fins. The adults have a brownish face, with the adjacent part of the body behind reddish orange and the posterior body being browner. The dorsal and anal fins are bright orange while the caudal fin is vermilion. The dorsal fin contains 14 spines and 17-19 soft rays while the anal fin has 3 spines and 19-19 soft rays.

== Distribution ==
The Clarion angelfish has a very limited range in the Eastern Pacific Ocean, being largely restricted to the Revillagigedo Islands of Mexico. Vagrants have occasionally been reported from the southern tip of Baja California and the southeastern part of the Gulf of California, as well as Clipperton Island, a French territory.

== Habitat and biology ==
The Clarion angelfish is found in rocky reefs at depths of up to 30 metres (98 ft). They are typically encountered as either solitary individuals or in shoals. It is a little studied species.

== Systematics ==
The Clarion angelfish was first formally described in 1890 by the American ichthyologist Charles Henry Gilbert (1859-1928), with the type locality given as Clarion, Socorro and San Benedicto Islands in the Revillagigedo Islands, western Mexico. The specific name refers to Clarion Island.

== Utilisation ==
The Clarion angelfish was formerly collected for the aquarium trade, but since the Revillagigedo Islands were declared a protected area collection has been illegal. It has, however, been bred in captivity and captive bred specimens have entered the trade.
