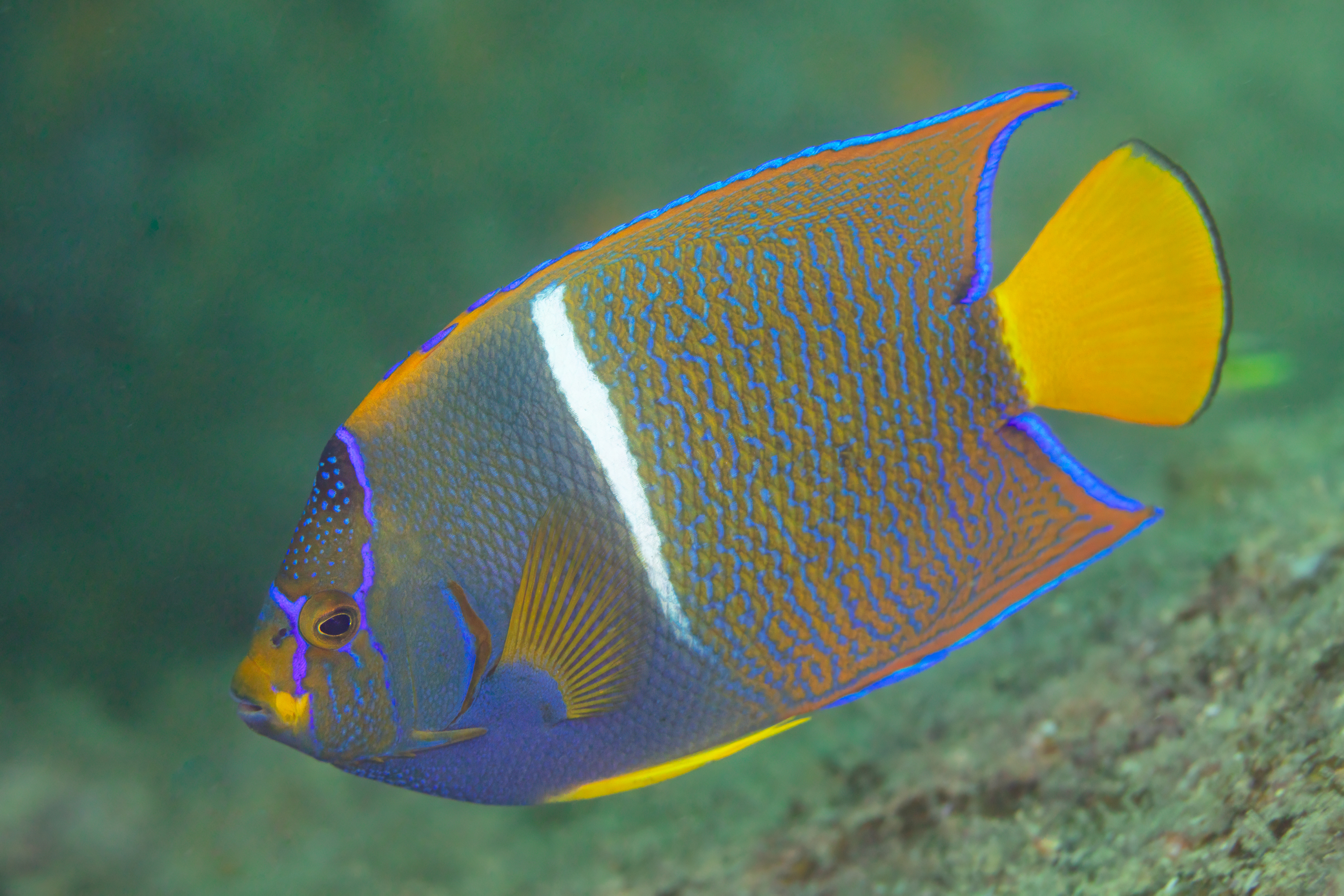
- Sexually mature king angelfish

Conservation status
- Least Concern (IUCN 3.1)

Scientific classification
- Kingdom: Animalia
- Phylum: Chordata
- Class: Actinopterygii
- Division: Teleostei
- Order: Acanthuriformes
- Family: Pomacanthidae
- Genus: Holacanthus
- Species: H. passer

Binomial name
- Holacanthus passer Valenciennes, 1864

= Holacanthus passer =

Species of fish

Holacanthus passer (king angelfish or passer angelfish) is a large reef dwelling marine angelfish of the family Pomacanthidae.

== Distribution ==
The king angelfish is a non-migratory tropical fish that inhabits reefs in the eastern Pacific Ocean from the coast of Peru north to the Gulf of California, including offshore islands as far west as the Galapagos, generally at depth of 4–30 metres (13–98 ft).

== Description ==
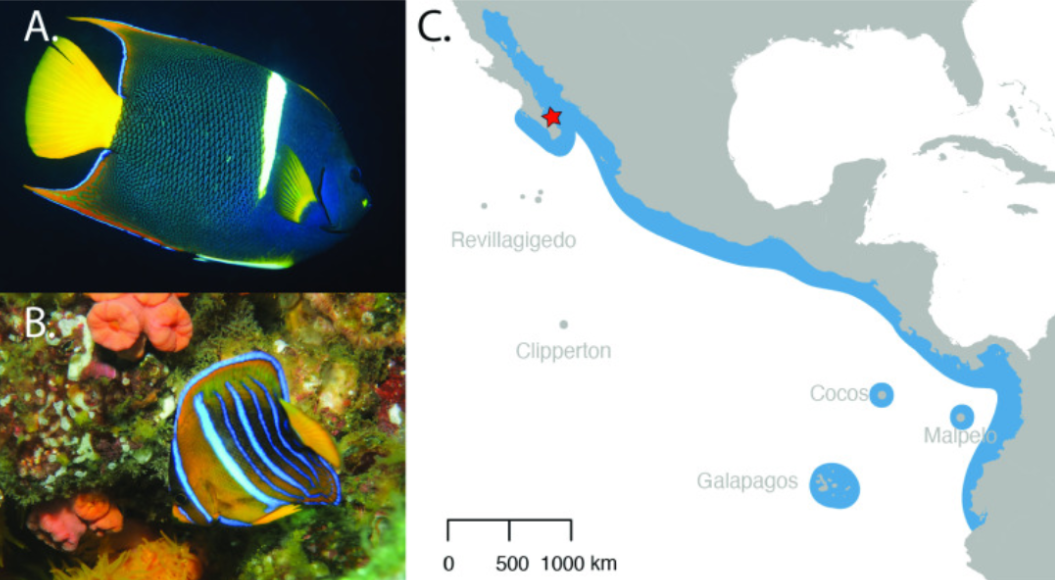
Figure 1: Adult king angelfish (A), juvenile king angelfish (B), range of the king angelfish (C)

Adult king angelfish are generally about 35 cm in length. They have between 18 and 20 rays in their dorsal fin and each of their pectoral fins, and 17 to 19 in their anal fin. H. passer also possess a strong spike under their lower cheek for defense. King angelfish undergo significant changes in coloration as they mature. Juvenile king angelfish are primarily orange-yellow including the pectoral and pelvic fins, rounded dorsal and anal fins rimmed with iridescent blue, blue striping towards the posterior of their bodies, and an orange mask around the eye. Sexually mature king angelfish, on the other hand, have mostly brown or blue bodies (depending on the light), light yellow pectoral and pelvic fins, a yellow patch on the mouth, the same blue rimming around the dorsal and anal fins, and a yellow caudal tail. Adults have pointed anal and caudal rays and lack the juvenile trait of blue striping across the body. Instead, they have a white stripe laterally anterior to the head. Sexual dimorphism exists in this species since females tend to have yellow pelvic fins, whereas males tend to have white pelvic fins. The two sexes can also be distinguished by size since males are up to 50% longer and 300% heavier than females.

== Biogeography ==
King angelfish are a part of the Tropical Eastern Pacific species of Holacanthus that diverged approximately 3–3.5 Mya through peripatric speciation alongside the other two species of angelfish in the clade, H. limbaughi and H. clarionensis. H. limbaughi is from the Clipperton Atoll and H. clarionensis is found mainly in the Revillagigedo Archipelago. H. limbaughi and H. clarionensis differ from H. passer in coloration since they are completely blue and do not possess the yellow caudal fin and white lateral stripe displayed by H. passer.

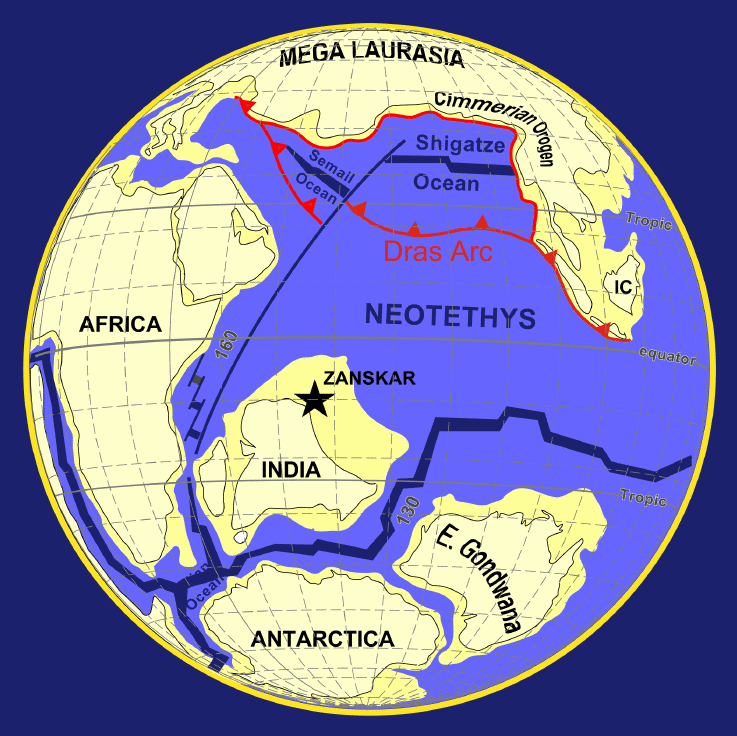
Figure 3: The closure of the Tethys Sea

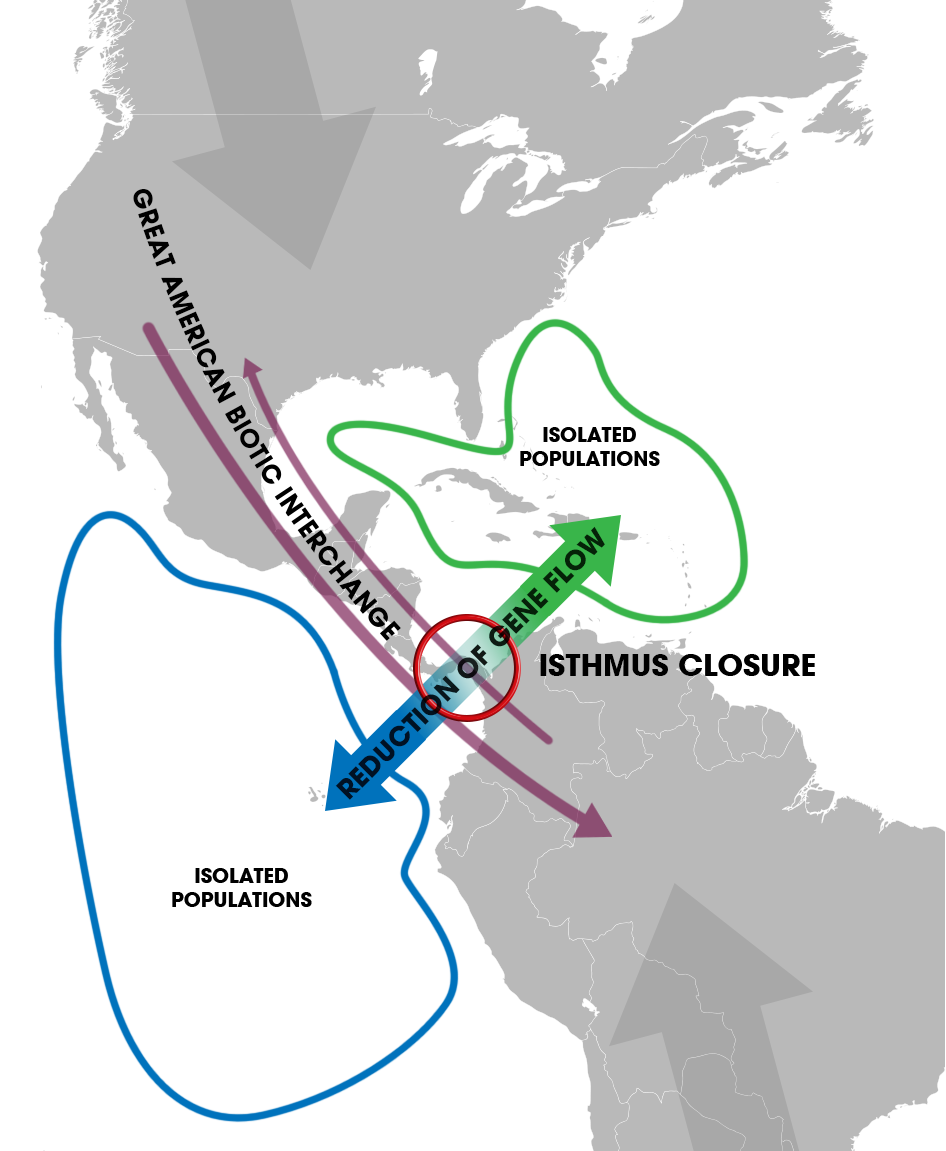
Figure 2: The closure of the Isthmus of Panama that led to the separation of Holacanthus and Pomacanthus.

The closure of the Isthmus of Panama ultimately caused the divergence between the genera Pomacanthus and Holacanthus. The biogeographical models from the study also show that the Tropical Eastern Pacific kingfish occurred before the Isthmus of Panama closed. This suggests that the clade of Tropical Eastern Pacific kingfish may have originated from an Indian Ocean invasion after the closure of the Tethys Sea.

Interestingly, there have been observations of a probable hybrid between H. clarionensis and H. passer in Cabo San Lucas. The features of this unidentified Pomacanthid include a bright orange-red caudal fin, pale yellow pelvic fins, and orange pectoral fins. The margins of the anal and dorsal fin of the fish were bright blue and were pointed similarly to that of H. passer. This interspecific hybridization is hypothesized to occur when conspecific mates are in short supply.

== Conservation Threats ==
The king angelfish conservation status is deemed least concern by the IUCN red list. However, the Conservation Regulation of Mexico granted the status of special protection to the king angelfish in 1996 due to overfishing, thus the harvest of this fish was limited and caused two fisheries in the Gulf of California to close in the early 2000s. After the fishing ban, the species seemed to recover, but unfortunately, there is no population density data on its presence in Latin America.

== Feeding ==
King angelfish are diurnal and feed on sponges, other sessile invertebrates, zooplankton, and certain species of benthic microalgae. H. passer spend the majority of time foraging in the middle of the water column feeding on zooplankton or in benthic communities grazing on algae. Foraging site selection differs with demography because females and small fish graze more frequently in benthic communities whereas males and large fish feed more frequently in the water column. In the Mexican Pacific Ocean, king angelfish are vital spongivores and were observed to consume up to 23 out of 24 different species of sponge surveyed with a specific preference for the order Hadromerida.

King angelfish also frequently engage in the coprophagy of other species' fecal matter. H. passer form positive relationships with other species such as Chromis atrilobata by acting as a cleaner fish. They benefit from these mutualistic cleaning interactions since it allows them to forage on the organic matter of the fish, including its feces.

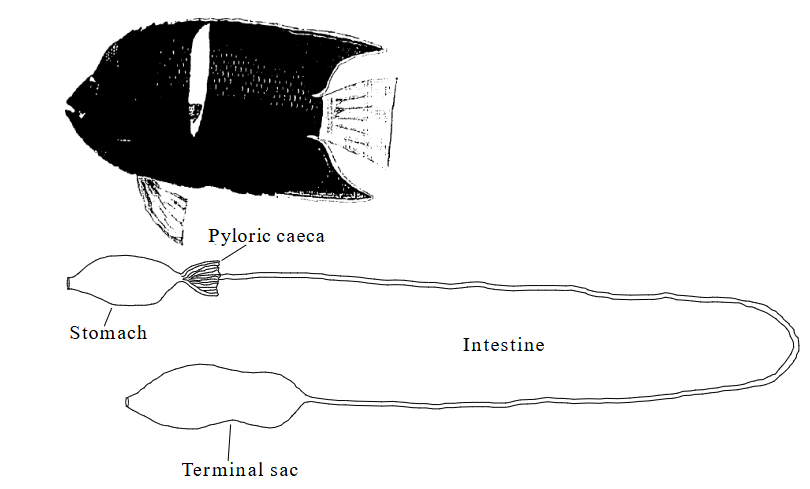
Figure 4: King angelfish digestive system

The digestive tract in angelfishes is fairly simple and is composed of a pyloric caeca attached to the stomach and an intestine connected to the terminal sac. They have an expanded region of the intestine called the hindgut chamber, where a diverse microbiome is used to help them digest algae. The hindgut chamber is highly vascularized, which also can help increase the absorptive efficiency of the organ. The king angelfish also hosts gut protists in its rectum, Protoopalina pomacantha, an opalinid flagellate resides in the large hindgut chamber of the fish.

== Habitat ==
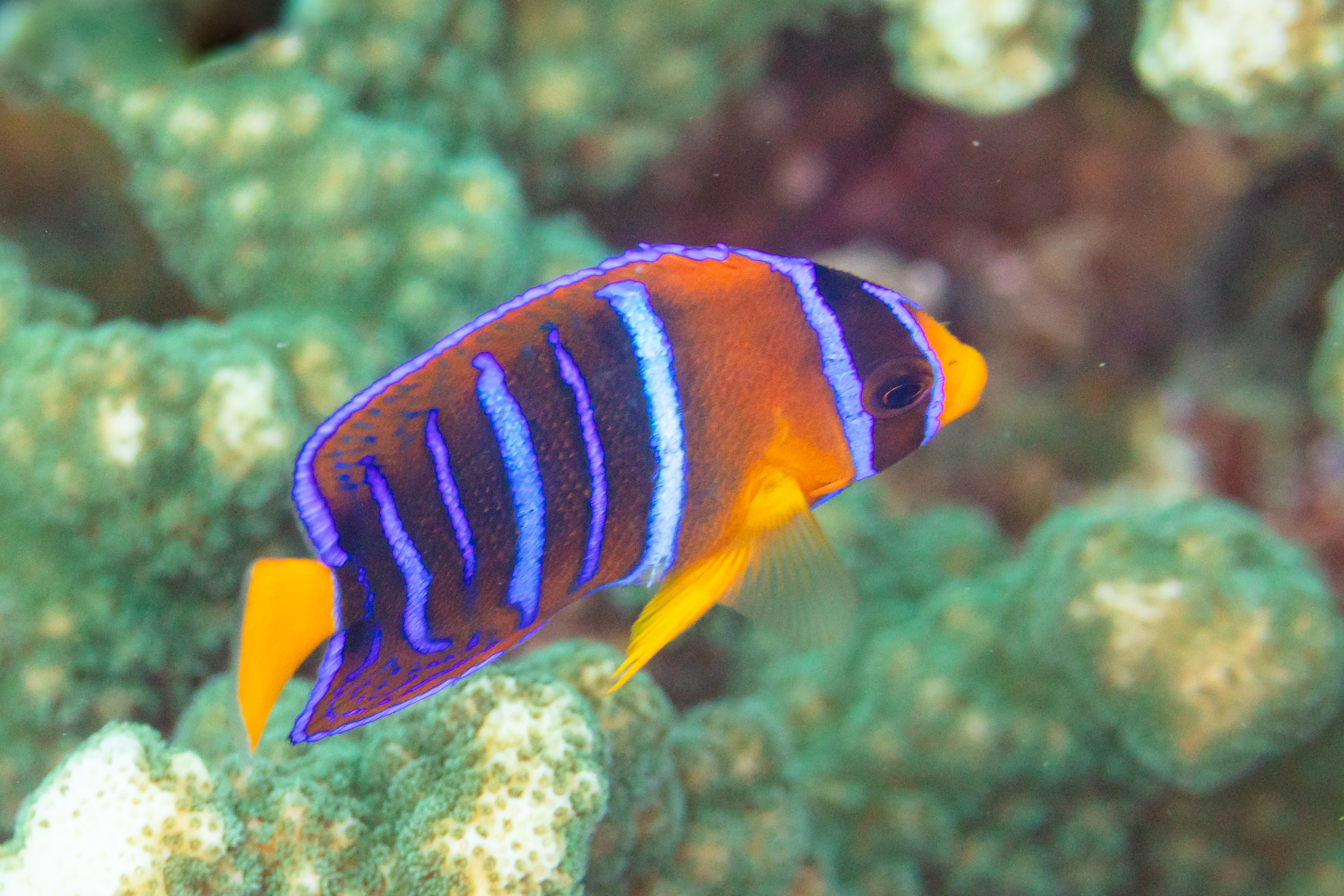
Juvenile in Baja California, Mexico

The king angelfish is considered an ecosystem engineer because it grazes in benthic communities which creates habitat for other species. H. passer primarily inhabits the middle and bottom of the water column of rocky tropical reefs and can be commonly found in crevices of large rocks. Juvenile king angelfish can occasionally be found in tide pools.

H. passer is well-studied in the Gulf of California and is considered a dominant species in the region due to its great relative abundance and occurrence. The Gulf of California is defined by its reefs with large boulders, small boulders, rhodoliths, black corals, and walls that drop down into the sea floor. The king angelfish occupies all of these elements in the gulf but appears to have a preference for habitats with sea walls and small individual boulders. Small boulders are often covered with algae and used as a feeding resource. Additionally, sea walls have strong currents which are particularly useful for feeding on plankton.

== Life History ==
=== Reproduction ===
King angelfish are monogamous within their pairs, and during their spawning cycle, will mate daily around sunset. The fish are broadcast spawners and currently their larval duration is currently unknown. During a spawning cycle a pair can produce upwards of ten million fertilized eggs, averaging about 25,000–75,000 daily. These eggs then drift in the water column for about 20 hours, at which point they hatch. After hatching, the finless fry live off their yolk sack until it is completely absorbed, at which point they begin to eat small zooplankton.

=== Courtship ===
In general, male and female king angelfish differ significantly in both behavior and general home range. The fish are normally found in long-term heterosexual pairs on the northern ranges and in the south, females are normally solitary except for when interacting with males and warding off other females with territorial behaviors. Male-female interactions are normally brief and consist of the fish swimming together in each other's territory. When the males gather at sunset for courtship, they exhibit aggressive territorial behaviors to defend their area. After the aggressive interactions decline, small groups of females arrive at the breeding grounds. Females swim over the prospective mate's territory and the male swims above her, spreading its pelvic fins and fluttering his body with short movements while swimming back and forth. Once the female is prepared to spawn, it ascends in a long, fluttering motion and is joined by the male which moves his head to the abdomen of the female and quivers. They then slowly ascend to the surface while spinning from 1.5 to 3 times before spawning. After spawning, the male and female descend to the sea floor before departing. Larger males tend to have higher reproductive success and normally have multiple females within their territory. These females waiting to spawn can sometimes be "stolen" by the smaller males viewing the territory.

== Aquarium Keeping ==
King angelfish are somewhat popular as aquarium fish; however, their large size, specialized diet, and high cost can make them unfavorable to keep when compared with other fish. They have not bred in captivity and hence can be difficult to find in most hobby shops, however, they are more likely to be sold by online mail-order companies. King angelfish require live sponges and tunicates as a food source and will often not accept prepared foods. They are not particularly sensitive about salinity or pH, so long as these levels are kept stable and the water quality is high, they will be able to survive. King angelfish enjoy swimming and grazing, so they require a tank that is at least 125 gallons. Angelfish in general are aggressive community inhabitants, but if introduced when young, a lucky aquarist may be able to keep two angelfish in one appropriately sized aquarium. However, such experiences are not the norm. King angelfish are quite dominant and can be abusive to smaller or more docile tankmates that are lower on the social hierarchy.
