= Safor (brand) =

UK fashion accessories brand

Sarah Forsyth London (previously Safor) is a United Kingdom based fashion accessories brand created by Sarah Forsyth in 2007. The business designs handbags and leather goods and commissions their manufacture in Italy and the Asia Pacific region. Safor's signature is the use of genuine leather and CITES-certificated exotic skins (including snake and fish) and bright, often metallic, colours.

== Sources ==
- Vogue.com 31 March 2011
- Vogue.com 28 July 2008
