= Chromatophore =

Cells with a primary function of coloration found in a wide range of animals

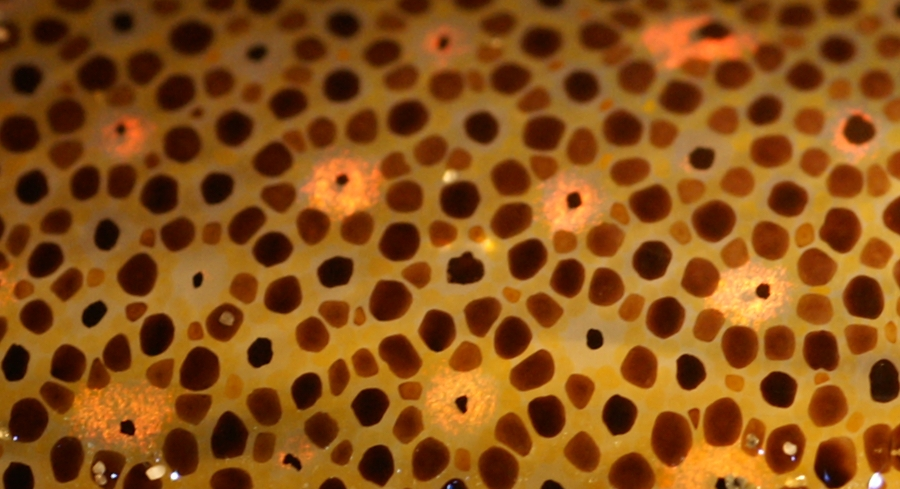
Chromatophores in the skin of a squid

Chromatophores are cells that produce color, of which many types are pigment-containing cells, or groups of cells, found in a wide range of animals including amphibians, fish, reptiles, crustaceans and cephalopods. Mammals and birds, in contrast, have a class of cells called melanocytes for coloration.

Chromatophores are largely responsible for generating skin and eye colour in ectothermic animals and are generated in the neural crest during embryonic development. Mature chromatophores are grouped into subclasses based on their colour under white light: xanthophores (yellow), erythrophores (red), iridophores (reflective / iridescent), leucophores (white), melanophores (black/brown), and cyanophores (blue). While most chromatophores contain pigments that absorb specific wavelengths of light, the color of leucophores and iridophores is produced by their respective scattering and optical interference properties.

7x speed timelapse video of fish melanophores responding to 200μM adrenaline

Some species can rapidly change colour through mechanisms that translocate pigment and reorient reflective plates within chromatophores. This process, often used as a type of camouflage, is called physiological colour change or metachrosis. Cephalopods, such as the octopus, have complex chromatophore organs controlled by muscles to achieve this, whereas vertebrates such as chameleons generate a similar effect by cell signalling. Such signals can be hormones or neurotransmitters and may be initiated by changes in mood, temperature, stress or visible changes in the local environment. Chromatophores are studied by scientists to understand human disease and as a tool in drug discovery.

== Human discovery ==
Aristotle mentioned the ability of the octopus to change colour for both camouflage and signalling in his Historia animalium (ca 4th century BC):

The octopus ... seeks its prey by so changing its colour as to render it like the colour of the stones adjacent to it; it does so also when alarmed.

Giosuè Sangiovanni was the first to describe invertebrate pigment-bearing cells as cromoforo in an Italian science journal in 1819.

Charles Darwin described the colour-changing abilities of the cuttlefish in The Voyage of the Beagle (1860):

These animals also escape detection by a very extraordinary, chameleon-like power of changing their colour. They appear to vary their tints according to the nature of the ground over which they pass: when in deep water, their general shade was brownish purple, but when placed on the land, or in shallow water, this dark tint changed into one of a yellowish green. The colour, examined more carefully, was a French grey, with numerous minute spots of bright yellow: the former of these varied in intensity; the latter entirely disappeared and appeared again by turns. These changes were effected in such a manner that clouds, varying in tint between a hyacinth red and a chestnut-brown, were continually passing over the body. Any part, being subjected to a slight shock of galvanism, became almost black: a similar effect, but in a less degree, was produced by scratching the skin with a needle. These clouds, or blushes as they may be called, are said to be produced by the alternate expansion and contraction of minute vesicles containing variously coloured fluids.

== Classification of chromatophore ==
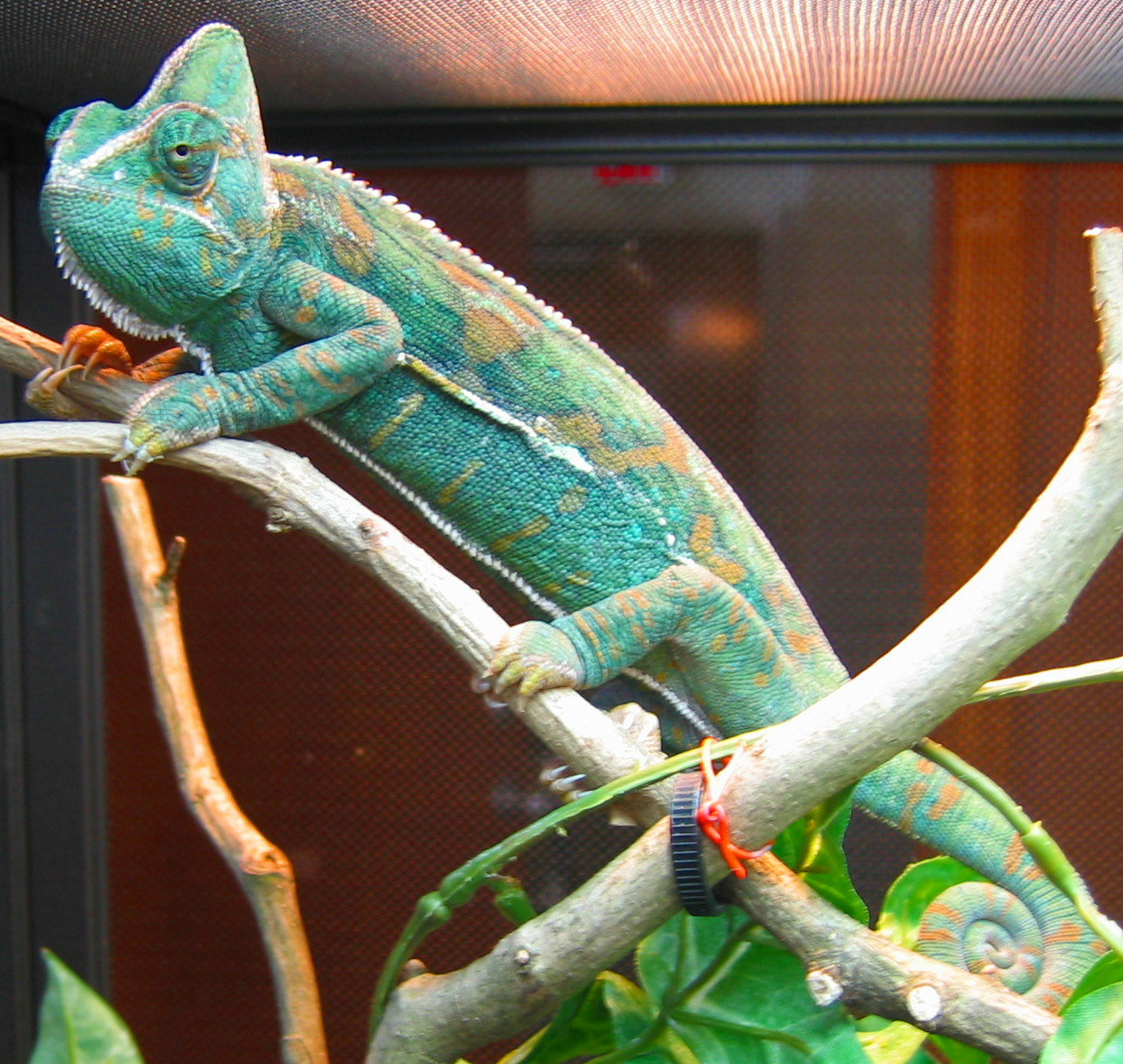
A veiled chameleon, Chamaeleo calyptratus. Structural green and blue colours are generated by overlaying chromatophore types to reflect filtered light.

The term chromatophore was adopted (following Sangiovanni's chromoforo) as the name for pigment-bearing cells derived from the neural crest of cold-blooded vertebrates and cephalopods. The word itself comes from the Greek words chrōma (χρῶμα) meaning "colour," and phoros (φόρος) meaning "bearing". In contrast, the word chromatocyte (kytos (κύτος) meaning "cell") was adopted for the cells responsible for colour found in birds and mammals. Only one such cell type, the melanocyte, has been identified in these animals.

It was only in the 1960s that chromatophores were well enough understood to enable them to be classified based on their appearance. This classification system persists to this day, even though the biochemistry of the pigments may be more useful to a scientific understanding of how the cells function.

Colour-producing molecules fall into two distinct classes: biochromes and structural colours or "schemochromes". The biochromes include true pigments, such as carotenoids and pteridines. These pigments selectively absorb parts of the visible light spectrum that makes up white light while permitting other wavelengths to reach the eye of the observer. Structural colours are produced by various combinations of diffraction, reflection or scattering of light from structures with a scale around a quarter of the wavelength of light. Many such structures interfere with some wavelengths (colours) of light and transmit others, simply because of their scale, so they often produce iridescence by creating different colours when seen from different directions.

Whereas all chromatophores contain pigments or reflecting structures (except when there has been a mutation, as in albinism), not all pigment-containing cells are chromatophores. Haem, for example, is a biochrome responsible for the red appearance of blood. It is found primarily in red blood cells (erythrocytes), which are generated in bone marrow throughout the life of an organism, rather than being formed during embryological development. Therefore, erythrocytes are not classified as chromatophores.

=== Xanthophores and erythrophores ===
Chromatophores that contain large amounts of yellow pteridine pigments are named xanthophores; those with mainly red/orange carotenoids are termed erythrophores. However, vesicles containing pteridine and carotenoids are sometimes found in the same cell, in which case the overall colour depends on the ratio of red and yellow pigments. Therefore, the distinction between these chromatophore types is not always clear.

Most chromatophores can generate pteridines from guanosine triphosphate, but xanthophores appear to have supplemental biochemical pathways enabling them to accumulate yellow pigment. In contrast, carotenoids are metabolised and transported to erythrophores. This was first demonstrated by rearing normally green frogs on a diet of carotene-restricted crickets. The absence of carotene in the frogs' diet meant that the red/orange carotenoid colour 'filter' was not present in their erythrophores. This made the frogs appear blue instead of green.

=== Iridophores and leucophores ===
Leucophore layer composition

Iridophores, sometimes also called guanophores, are chromatophores that reflect light using plates of crystalline chemochromes made from guanine. When illuminated they generate iridescent colours because of the constructive interference of light. Fish iridophores are typically stacked guanine plates separated by layers of cytoplasm to form microscopic, one-dimensional, Bragg mirrors. Both the orientation and the optical thickness of the chemochrome determines the nature of the colour observed and can be highly regulated by different concentrations of the hormone, Acetylcholine (ACh). By using biochromes as coloured filters, iridophores create an optical effect known as Tyndall or Rayleigh scattering, producing bright-blue or -green colours.

A related type of chromatophore, the leucophore, is found in some fish, in particular in the tapetum lucidum. Like iridophores, they utilize crystalline purines (often guanine) to reflect light. Unlike iridophores, leucophores have more organized crystals that reduce diffraction. Given a source of white light, they produce a white shine. As with xanthophores and erythrophores, in fish the distinction between iridophores and leucophores is not always obvious, but, in general, iridophores are considered to generate iridescent or metallic colours, whereas leucophores produce reflective white hues.

=== Melanophores ===
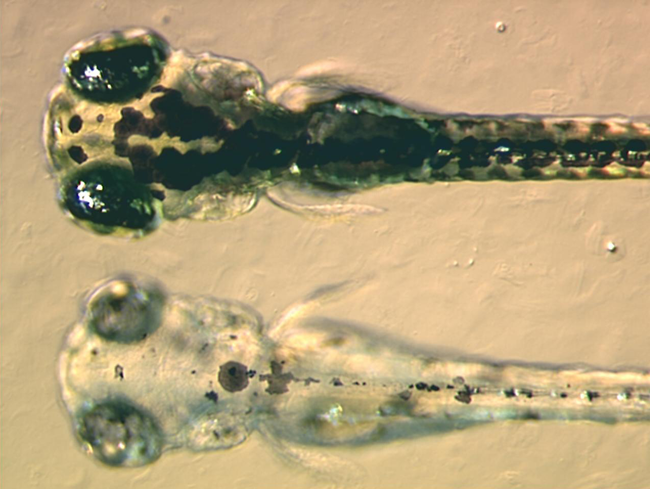
At the bottom a mutant zebrafish larva that fails to synthesise melanin in its melanophores, at the top a non-mutant, wildtype larva

Melanophores contain eumelanin, a type of melanin, that appears black or dark-brown because of its light absorbing qualities. It is packaged in vesicles called melanosomes and distributed throughout the cell. Eumelanin is generated from tyrosine in a series of catalysed chemical reactions. It is a complex chemical containing units of dihydroxyindole and dihydroxyindole-2-carboxylic acid with some pyrrole rings. The key enzyme in melanin synthesis is tyrosinase. When this protein is defective, no melanin can be generated resulting in certain types of albinism. In some amphibian species there are other pigments packaged alongside eumelanin. For example, a novel deep (wine) red-colour pigment was identified in the melanophores of phyllomedusine frogs. Some species of anole lizards, such as the Anolis grahami, use melanocytes in response to certain signals and hormonal changes, and is capable of becoming colors ranging from bright blue, brown, and black. This was subsequently identified as pterorhodin, a pteridine dimer that accumulates around eumelanin core, and it is also present in a variety of tree frog species from Australia and Papua New Guinea. While it is likely that other lesser-studied species have complex melanophore pigments, it is nevertheless true that the majority of melanophores studied to date do contain eumelanin exclusively.

Humans have only one class of pigment cell, the mammalian equivalent of melanophores, to generate skin, hair, and eye colour. For this reason, and because the large number and contrasting colour of the cells usually make them very easy to visualise, melanophores are by far the most widely studied chromatophore. However, there are differences between the biology of melanophores and that of melanocytes. In addition to eumelanin, melanocytes can generate a yellow/red pigment called phaeomelanin.

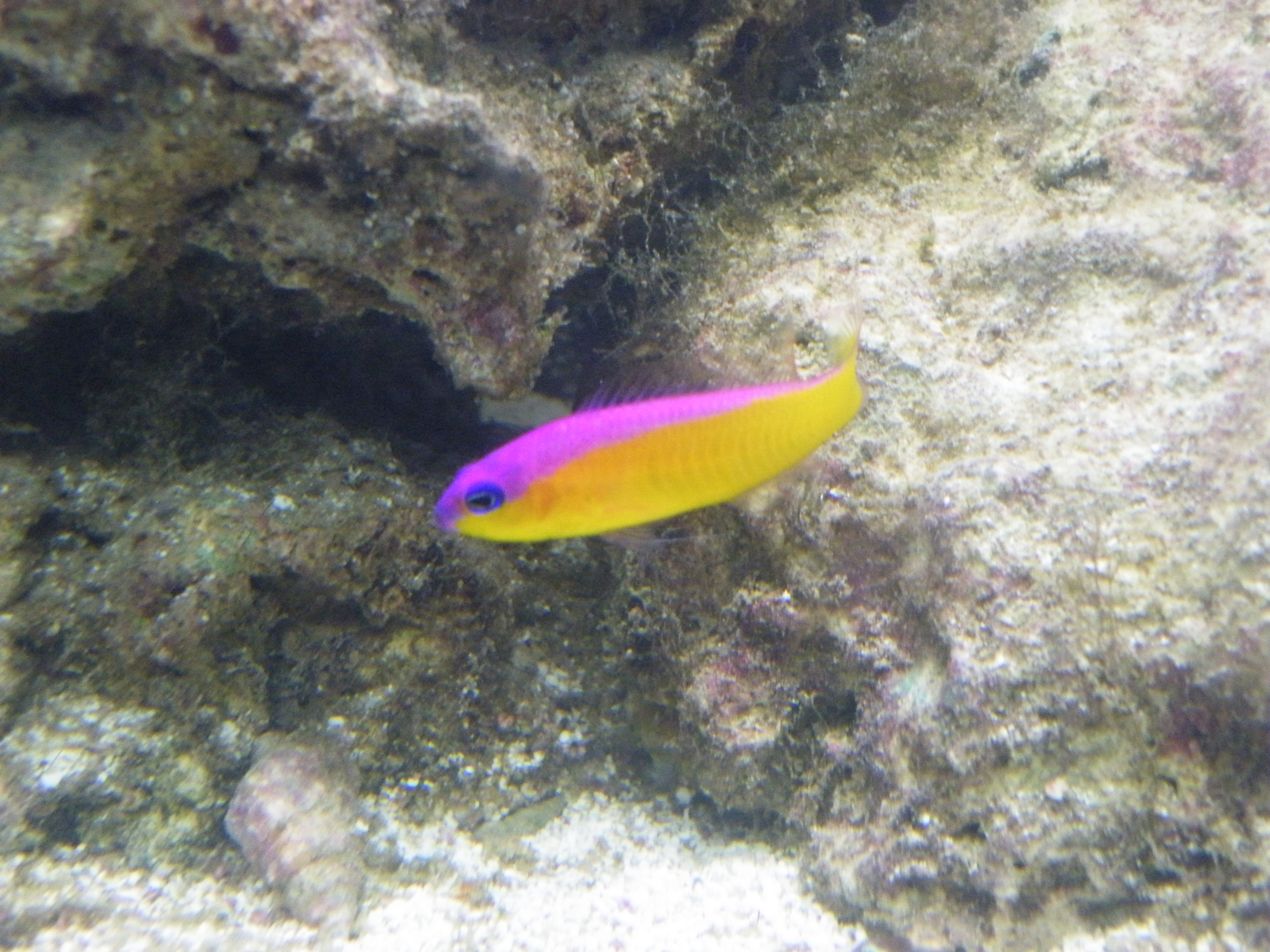
The purple-striped dottyback, Pseudochromis diadema, generates its violet stripe with an unusual type of chromatophore.

=== Cyanophores ===
Nearly all the vibrant blues in animals and plants are created by structural coloration rather than by pigments. However, some types of Synchiropus splendidus do possess vesicles of a cyan biochrome of unknown chemical structure in cells named cyanophores. Although they appear unusual in their limited taxonomic range, there may be cyanophores (as well as further unusual chromatophore types) in other fish and amphibians. For example, brightly coloured chromatophores with undefined pigments are found in both poison dart frogs and glass frogs, and atypical dichromatic chromatophores, named erythro-iridophores have been described in Pseudochromis diadema.

== Pigment translocation ==
Fish and frog melanophores are cells that can change colour by dispersing or aggregating pigment-containing bodies.

Many species are able to translocate the pigment inside their chromatophores, resulting in an apparent change in body colour. This process, known as physiological colour change, is most widely studied in melanophores, since melanin is the darkest and most visible pigment. In most species with a relatively thin dermis, the dermal melanophores tend to be flat and cover a large surface area. However, in animals with thick dermal layers, such as adult reptiles, dermal melanophores often form three-dimensional units with other chromatophores. These dermal chromatophore units (DCU) consist of an uppermost xanthophore or erythrophore layer, then an iridophore layer, and finally a basket-like melanophore layer with processes covering the iridophores.

Both types of melanophore are important in physiological colour change. Flat dermal melanophores often overlay other chromatophores, so when the pigment is dispersed throughout the cell the skin appears dark. When the pigment is aggregated toward the centre of the cell, the pigments in other chromatophores are exposed to light and the skin takes on their hue. Likewise, after melanin aggregation in DCUs, the skin appears green through xanthophore (yellow) filtering of scattered light from the iridophore layer. On the dispersion of melanin, the light is no longer scattered and the skin appears dark. As the other biochromatic chromatophores are also capable of pigment translocation, animals with multiple chromatophore types can generate a spectacular array of skin colours by making good use of the divisional effect.

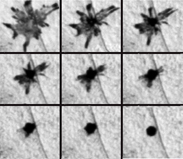
A single zebrafish melanophore imaged by time-lapse photography during pigment aggregation

The control and mechanics of rapid pigment translocation has been well studied in a number of different species, in particular amphibians and teleost fish. It has been demonstrated that the process can be under hormonal or neuronal control or both and for many species of bony fishes it is known that chromatophores can respond directly to environmental stimuli like visible light, UV-radiation, temperature, pH, chemicals, etc. Neurochemicals that are known to translocate pigment include noradrenaline, through its receptor on the surface on melanophores. The primary hormones involved in regulating translocation appear to be the melanocortins, melatonin, and melanin-concentrating hormone (MCH), that are produced mainly in the pituitary, pineal gland, and hypothalamus, respectively. These hormones may also be generated in a paracrine fashion by cells in the skin. At the surface of the melanophore, the hormones have been shown to activate specific G-protein-coupled receptors that, in turn, transduce the signal into the cell. Melanocortins result in the dispersion of pigment, while melatonin and MCH results in aggregation.

Numerous melanocortin, MCH and melatonin receptors have been identified in fish and frogs, including a homologue of MC1R, a melanocortin receptor known to regulate skin and hair colour in humans. It has been demonstrated that MC1R is required in zebrafish for dispersion of melanin. Inside the cell, cyclic adenosine monophosphate (cAMP) has been shown to be an important second messenger of pigment translocation. Through a mechanism not yet fully understood, cAMP influences other proteins such as protein kinase A to drive molecular motors carrying pigment containing vesicles along both microtubules and microfilaments.

== Background adaptation ==
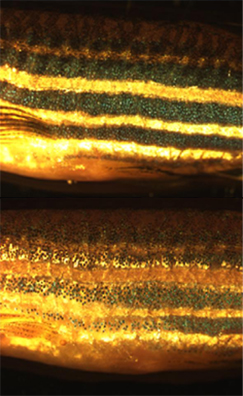
Zebrafish chromatophores mediate background adaptation on exposure to dark (top) and light environments (bottom).

Most fish, reptiles and amphibians undergo a limited physiological colour change in response to a change in environment. This type of camouflage, known as background adaptation, most commonly appears as a slight darkening or lightening of skin tone to approximately mimic the hue of the immediate environment. It has been demonstrated that the background adaptation process is vision-dependent (it appears the animal needs to be able to see the environment to adapt to it), and that melanin translocation in melanophores is the major factor in colour change. Some animals, such as chameleons and anoles, have a highly developed background adaptation response capable of generating a number of different colours very rapidly. They have adapted the capability to change colour in response to temperature, mood, stress levels, and social cues, rather than to simply mimic their environment.

== Development ==
Cross-section of a developing vertebrate trunk showing the dorsolateral (red) and ventromedial (blue) routes of chromatoblast migration

During vertebrate embryonic development, chromatophores are one of a number of cell types generated in the neural crest, a paired strip of cells arising at the margins of the neural tube. These cells have the ability to migrate long distances, allowing chromatophores to populate many organs of the body, including the skin, eye, ear, and brain. Fish melanophores and iridophores have been found to contain the smooth muscle regulatory proteins [calponin] and caldesmon. Leaving the neural crest in waves, chromatophores take either a dorsolateral route through the dermis, entering the ectoderm through small holes in the basal lamina, or a ventromedial route between the somites and the neural tube. The exception to this is the melanophores of the retinal pigmented epithelium of the eye. These are not derived from the neural crest. Instead, an outpouching of the neural tube generates the optic cup, which, in turn, forms the retina.

When and how multipotent chromatophore precursor cells (called chromatoblasts) develop into their daughter subtypes is an area of ongoing research. It is known in zebrafish embryos, for example, that by 3 days after fertilization each of the cell classes found in the adult fish—melanophores, xanthophores and iridophores—are already present. Studies using mutant fish have demonstrated that transcription factors such as kit, sox10, and mitf are important in controlling chromatophore differentiation. If these proteins are defective, chromatophores may be regionally or entirely absent, resulting in a leucistic disorder.

== Practical applications ==
Chromatophores are sometimes used in applied research. For example, zebrafish larvae are used to study how chromatophores organise and communicate to accurately generate the regular horizontal striped pattern as seen in adult fish. This is seen as a useful model system for understanding patterning in the evolutionary developmental biology field. Chromatophore biology has also been used to model human condition or disease, including melanoma and albinism. Recently, the gene responsible for the melanophore-specific golden zebrafish strain, Slc24a5, was shown to have a human equivalent that strongly correlates with skin colour.

Chromatophores are also used as a biomarker of blindness in cold-blooded species, as animals with certain visual defects fail to background adapt to light environments. Human homologues of receptors that mediate pigment translocation in melanophores are thought to be involved in processes such as appetite suppression and tanning, making them attractive targets for drugs. Therefore, pharmaceutical companies have developed a biological assay for rapidly identifying potential bioactive compounds using melanophores from the African clawed frog. Other scientists have developed techniques for using melanophores as biosensors, and for rapid disease detection (based on the discovery that pertussis toxin blocks pigment aggregation in fish melanophores). Potential military applications of chromatophore-mediated colour changes have been proposed, mainly as a type of active camouflage, which could as in cuttlefish make objects nearly invisible.

== Cephalopod chromatophores ==
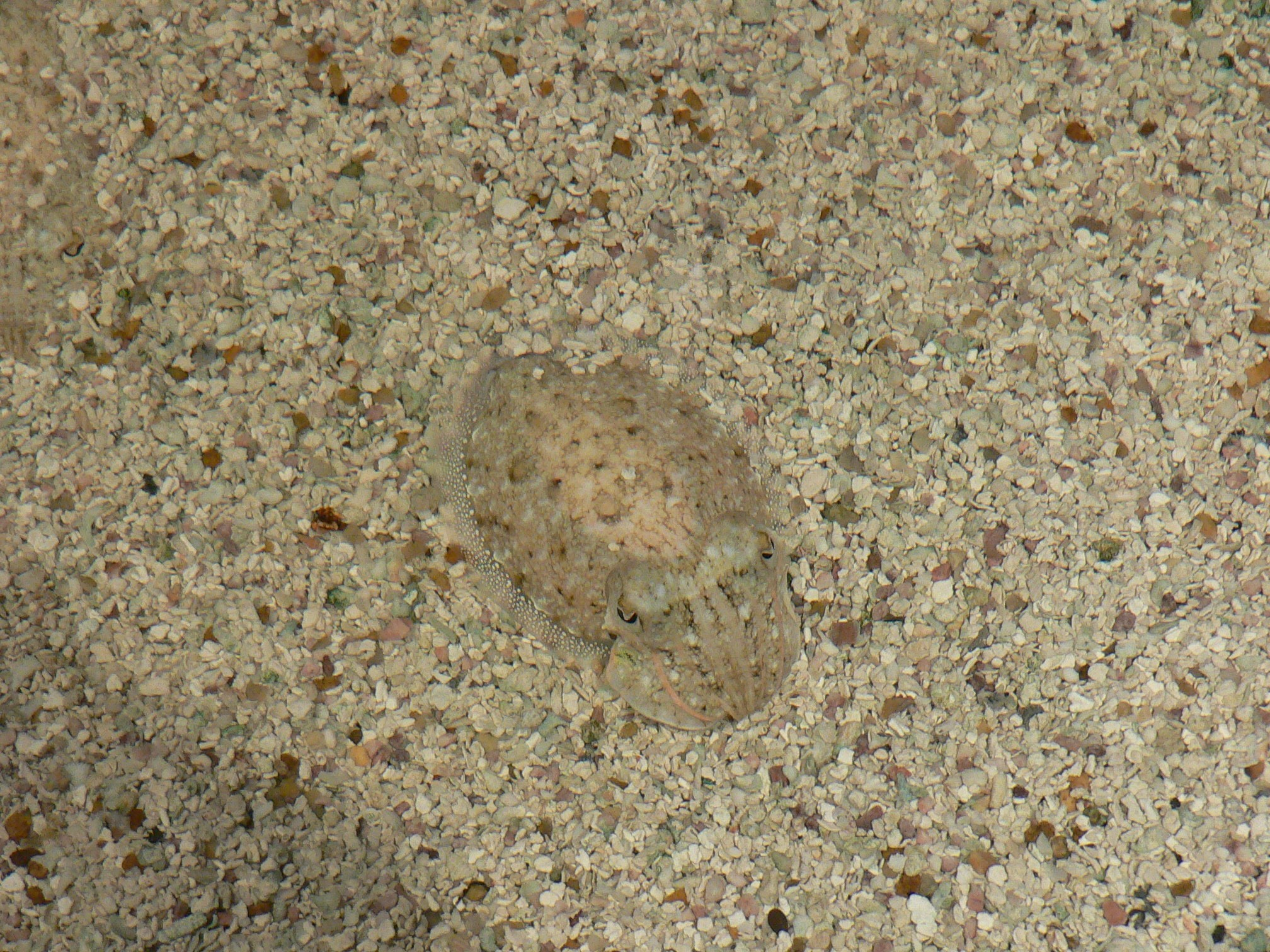
An infant cuttlefish, using background adaptation to mimic the local environment

Coleoid cephalopods (including octopuses, squids and cuttlefish) have complex multicellular organs that they use to change colour rapidly, producing a wide variety of bright colours and patterns. Each chromatophore unit is composed of a single chromatophore cell and numerous muscle, nerve, glial, and sheath cells. Inside the chromatophore cell, pigment granules are enclosed in an elastic sac, called the cytoelastic sacculus. To change colour the animal distorts the sacculus form or size by muscular contraction, changing its translucency, reflectivity, or opacity. This differs from the mechanism used in fish, amphibians, and reptiles in that the shape of the sacculus is changed, rather than translocating pigment vesicles within the cell. However, a similar effect is achieved. The energy cost of the complete activation of the chromatophore system is very high, being nearly as much as all the energy used by an octopus at rest.

Octopuses and most cuttlefish can operate chromatophores in complex, undulating chromatic displays, resulting in a variety of rapidly changing colour schemata. The nerves that operate the chromatophores are thought to be positioned in the brain in a pattern isomorphic to that of the chromatophores they each control. This means the pattern of colour change functionally matches the pattern of neuronal activation. This may explain why, as the neurons are activated in iterative signal cascade, one may observe waves of colour changing. Like chameleons, cephalopods use physiological colour change for social interaction. They are also among the most skilled at camouflage, having the ability to match both the colour distribution and the texture of their local environment with remarkable accuracy.

== See also ==
- Animal coloration
- Chromophore
- Thylakoid
