= Kankara sanshin =

Ryukyu Islands musical instrument

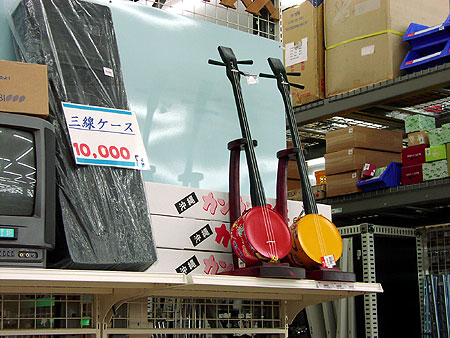
Kankara sanshin

The kankara (かんから) or kankara sanshin (literally "sanshin from a can") is a Ryukyu islands three-stringed ethic plucked instrument, initially an improvised derivative of the Okinawan sanshin that was developed in the Ryukyu Islands during the Shōwa period.

Like the wooden-bodied gottan, the kankara is an inexpensive alternative to other, professional Ryukyuan and Japanese lutes – namely the sanshin and the similar, albeit larger shamisen. Unlike the gottan, however, the kankara was invented much later and served a much different purpose historically.

== History ==
The kankara sanshin originates in the period following the World War II Battle of Okinawa. Okinawans, including men detained by the American military, made use of metal cans discarded by the Americans, and used them as the body for improvised sanshin.

A similar type of can-based sanshin was made by Japanese-Americans in internment camps in the United States during the war.

Since World War II, kankara have become popular as inexpensive alternatives to the sanshin or shamisen, and professional sanshin or shamisen makers have begun to craft them and include them in their stores, online and in catalogues. The kankara itself has also evolved to some degree, with certain makers creating more ornate instruments with hand-painted frontal designs and the decorative wrappings tiigaa (手掛) that are a feature of the sanshin proper. DIY "build-your-own" kankara sanshin kits are also readily available.

== Construction and components ==
The following is a list of basic components that normally make up a kankara sanshin, with Okinawan and Japanese phrases that refer to the English terms in sanshin and shamisen parlance:

- Body (胴; Okinawan: chiiga, Japanese: dou) – An empty metal can or cylinder is used to create the body of the instrument, in lieu of the snakeskin-covered bodies typical of sanshin.
- Headstock (天, ten) – The headstock of the instrument is made in an unspecified way, usually resembling that of a sanshin or shamisen. It is normally an extension of the neck.
- Neck (棹; Okinawan: sō) – The long neck of the instrument is constructed from any one of an assortment of different types of wood. (Note: Originally, the neck was usually crafted from the leg post of a bed and was whittled down by using old, typically worn swords or bayonets left over from the war.)
- Strings (絃; Okinawan: chiru/jiru, Japanese: gen) – The kankara, normally being a less costly instrument than a sanshin proper, may have its strings made from any of a variety of materials. There is no normative material used for stringing. Nylon, sinew, metal wire and other materials may be used, depending upon the maker. (Note: Originally, parachute cords were utilized for this purpose.)
- Tuning pegs (範; Okinawan: karakui) – The tuning pegs/knobs/keys used for the kankara are made in an unspecified way, sometimes resembling the long pegs characteristic of the sanshin and shamisen, and at other times more akin to those found on modern and classical guitars.

== See also ==
- Ryukyuan music
- Sanshin
- Gottan
- Sanxian
- Shamisen
