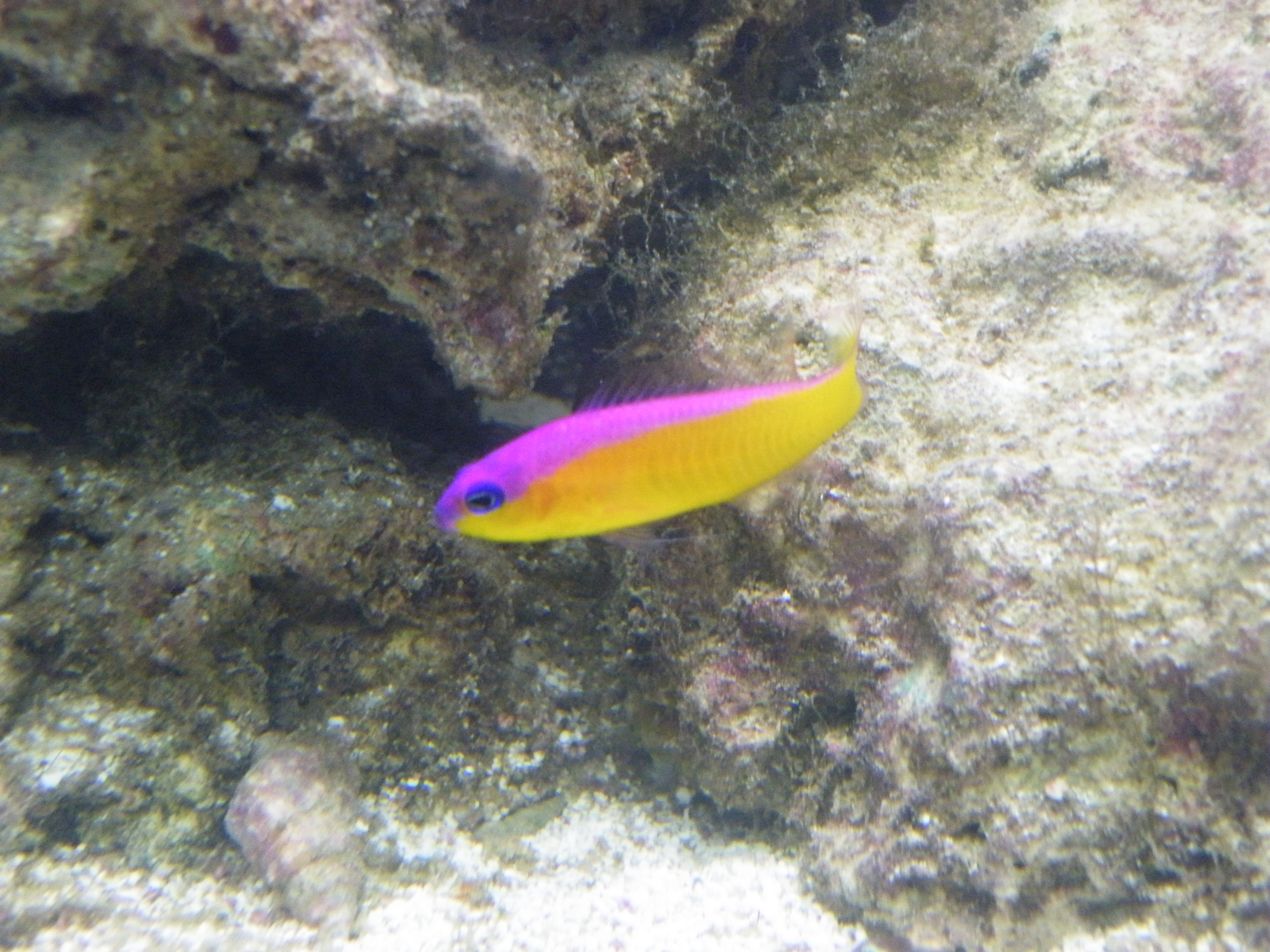

Scientific classification
- Kingdom: Animalia
- Phylum: Chordata
- Class: Actinopterygii
- Division: Teleostei
- Order: Blenniiformes
- Family: Pseudochromidae
- Genus: Pictichromis
- Species: P. diadema

Binomial name
- Pictichromis diadema (Lubbock & Randall, 1978)

Synonyms
- Pseudochromis diadema Lubbock & Randall, 1978

= Pictichromis diadema =

Species of fish

Pictichromis diadema, the diadem dottyback, is a member of the family Pseudochromidae. These fish are primarily yellow with a purple stripe that runs along the length of their body and back into the dorsal fin.

== Description ==
The diadem dottyback has an elongated, nearly cylindrical body and can range anywhere from 5-10cm3. This species is characterized by its bright yellow body contrasted by a broad pink to reddish-violet band that extends from the mouth along the upper back, ending near the caudal peduncle. The purple stripe on this species of fish extends all the way to the chin in most male fish, however it stops near the lips in female fish. The eyes are large and dark, with distinct white spots on the iris. The vibrant colors of these dottybacks are produced by erythro-iridophores, specialized pigment cells that contain both reddish carotenoid pigments and reflective platelets that are similar to those in iridophores. These pigment cells cause the fish’s iridescence, as they have metallic hues that reflect light. These chromatophores are responsible for the species’ reddish-violet hues and may allow subtle shifts in color depending on lighting and background conditions. These color changing capabilities can be helpful in camouflage and social signaling for diadem dottyback fish. Dottyback fish can vary in appearance and color during their juvenile versus adult stage and generally go through two color changes through their development. In their juvenile stages, dottybacks start out as a somewhat translucent larve and develop a light grey color while settling into their coral reef habitat. As they reach their adult stages, dottyback fish mimic yellow fish in the reefs. This change occurs because of a gene that allows them to express various pigments throughout their life stages.

There is potential for the diadem dottyback fish to be confused with the royal dottyback, who has a similar purple and yellow appearance. The distinguishing characteristic is the purple stripe along the back of the diadem dottyback, whereas the royal dottyback is divided in half with one side being purple and the other side yellow. Morphologically, members of the genus Pictichromis were assigned to the family Pseudochromidae, based on diagnostic skeletal and pigmentary traits typical of dottybacks. These include the presence of well-developed jaws, continuous dorsal fins, and vivid sexual coloration patterns that distinguish them from closely related pseudochromid species.

== Taxonomy and systematics ==
Distribution of Pictichromis diadema

The diadem dottyback, Pictichromis diadema, is a small, coral reef fish belonging to the order Perciformes, within the family Pseudochromidae. These fish are commonly known as dottybacks. The family Pseudochromidae contains several subfamilies, with Pictichromis diadema classified under the subfamily Pseudochrominae. This subfamily is composed of small, vibrantly colored reef fishes that are distributed primarily throughout the Indo-Pacific region. The genus Pictichromis includes several closely related species, such as P. paccagnellae (the royal dottyback), P. porphyrea (the magenta dottyback), and P. dinar (the dinar dottyback). Members of this genus are distinguished by their bright bicolored patterns, elongated bodies, and territorial behavior, all of which are traits of the pseudochromid lineage. While early classifications suggested that the family Pseudochromidae might be paraphyletic, later analyses found that they became monophyletic with the inclusion of the Congrogadidae, a related family of eel-like reef fishes. Recent studies have continued to support the idea that Pictichromis diadema is a distinct species within this monophyletic group, with shared anatomical features such as a continuous dorsal fin, strong jaws, and sexual dimorphism.

This species is found in rich coral reefs in the western central Pacific Ocean, eastern Malay Peninsula, and western Philippine waters, also extending eastward toward Papua New Guinea. They are found as close as 5 metres (16 ft) to the surface and as far down as 30 m (98 ft). There are repeated biogeographical patterns among several pseudochromid groups, suggesting that Australia may represent a basal area within a broader Indo-Pacific distribution, from which related fish may have originated. In the present day, dottybacks are a popular fish in the aquarium trade, due to their small size and attractive colors. Generally in the Pseudochromidae family, male fish are more vibrant in color than female fish; this means that often times, male fish are overly exploited and selectively removed from their natural habitats for aquarium trade. To combat this issue, a switch to a captive breeding approach has helped rebound this fish population. Given that most dottyback fish are born and raised in captivity, they would be in the classification of “level three captivity”.

== Life history ==
Diadem dottybacks are a particularly aggressive breed of fish that usually target related species. Due to their aggressive behavior, dottyback fish occasionally live in small, territorial groups in marine environments, but are generally solitary fish in aquariums. Dottybacks are a diverse group of mesopredatory reef fishes that feed on cryptic macroinvertebrates, which are small, camouflaged invertebrates, and newly settled juvenile fishes. Members of the family Pseudochromidae lay demersal, adhesive eggs that attach to substrates or to one another using fine filaments that are hook-like projections. The egg is roughly 2cm long and can contain anywhere from 300-500 embryos, which is guarded by the male dottyback until hatching time. Warmer water temperatures can potentially have an impact on the abundance of juvenile fish, as studies have observed larger numbers in their habitats during the warmer months. In more primitive species, the filaments attach to the egg surface using oblong structures, while in more advanced groups like pseudoplesiopines and anisochromines, the filaments form tight clusters near the micropyle. These differences show evolutionary changes within the family, although similar egg structures in unrelated reef fishes, such as apogonids and pomacentrids, suggest these traits likely evolved independently. While there are few studies that track the fully life cycle of diadem dottyback fish, similar species such as the sunrise dottyback have an average lifespan of 5-7 years in the wild. Dottyback fish are aged by looking at the otolith ear bones, which have rings representing years of life.

Experimental studies have shown that several species of dottybacks are capable of bi-directional sex change, which means that individuals can change from male to female and back again. This represents the first confirmed evidence of functional sex change in both directions within the family Pseudochromidae. This flexibility in reproductive roles likely provides dottybacks with adaptive advantages in maintaining breeding pairs and stable social structures within reef environments. Functional sex change can be beneficial for fish because it helps maximize productivity and can even help in population recovery in certain groups.

== Conservation status ==
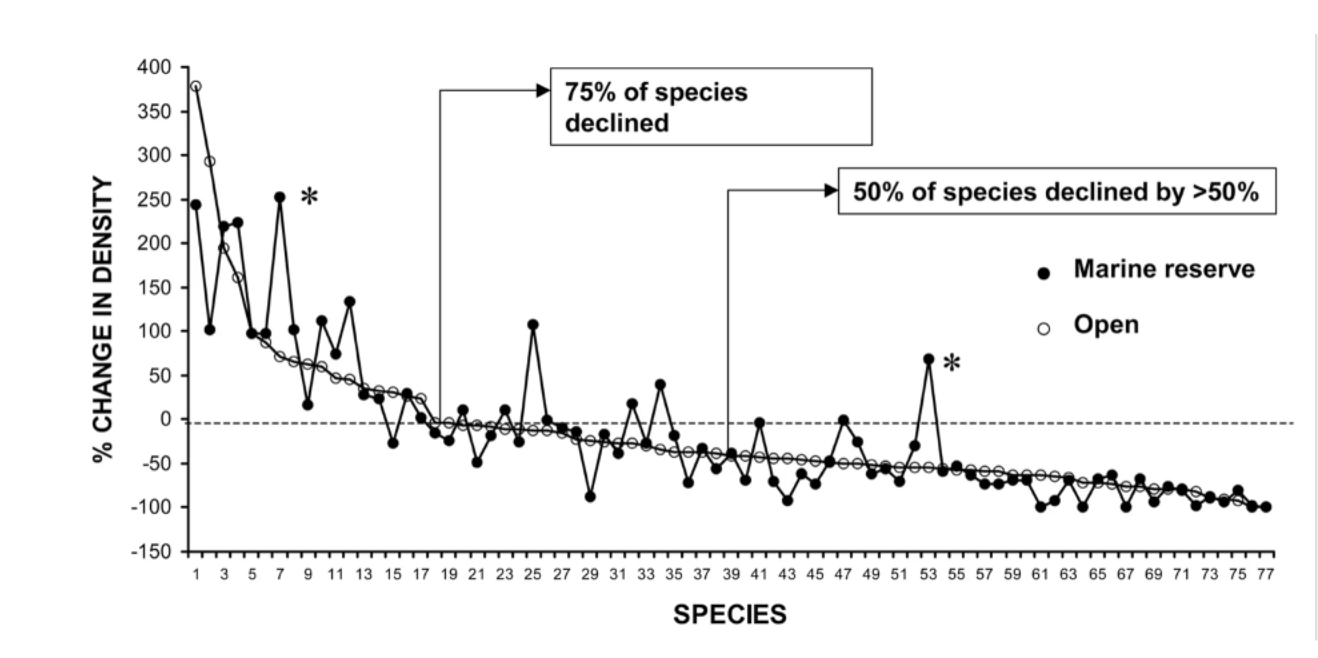
Population decline of coral reef fish between 1997-2003 due to the effects of habitat loss and degradation caused by climate change and increased ocean temperatures

While dottyback fish are not considered endangered, some species of fish can be vulnerable due to human interreference. As previously mentioned, male dottyback fish are often selectively captured from their natural habitats for use of aquarium trade. There is a potential for dottyback fish to be affected by climate change and increasing ocean temperatures in the future. Dottyback fish rely heavily on olfactory senses for prey detection, which certain studies have found to be negatively affected by increased CO2 concentrations, temperatures and ocean acidification. While there have been limited studies on the effects of climate change on dottyback fish as predators, there is certainly a chance that these fish will be affected as their habitats begin to change. Rising oceanic temperatures can similarly affect the habitat in which dottyback fish are found. Coral bleaching is a phenomenon that occurs when ocean temperatures become too high for coral to survive, which in turn slowly causes them to lose color and die. Coral death could have a serious impact the diadem dottyback fish if this pattern of coral death and habitat degradation continues. The threat of decline in species diversity in coral reef fish because of climate change is also rather abundant and has been declining since 1990. While the research on climate change and its effects on the diadem dottyback is not vast, the risk to coral reef fish is certainly abundant and could impact this species without immediate change.
