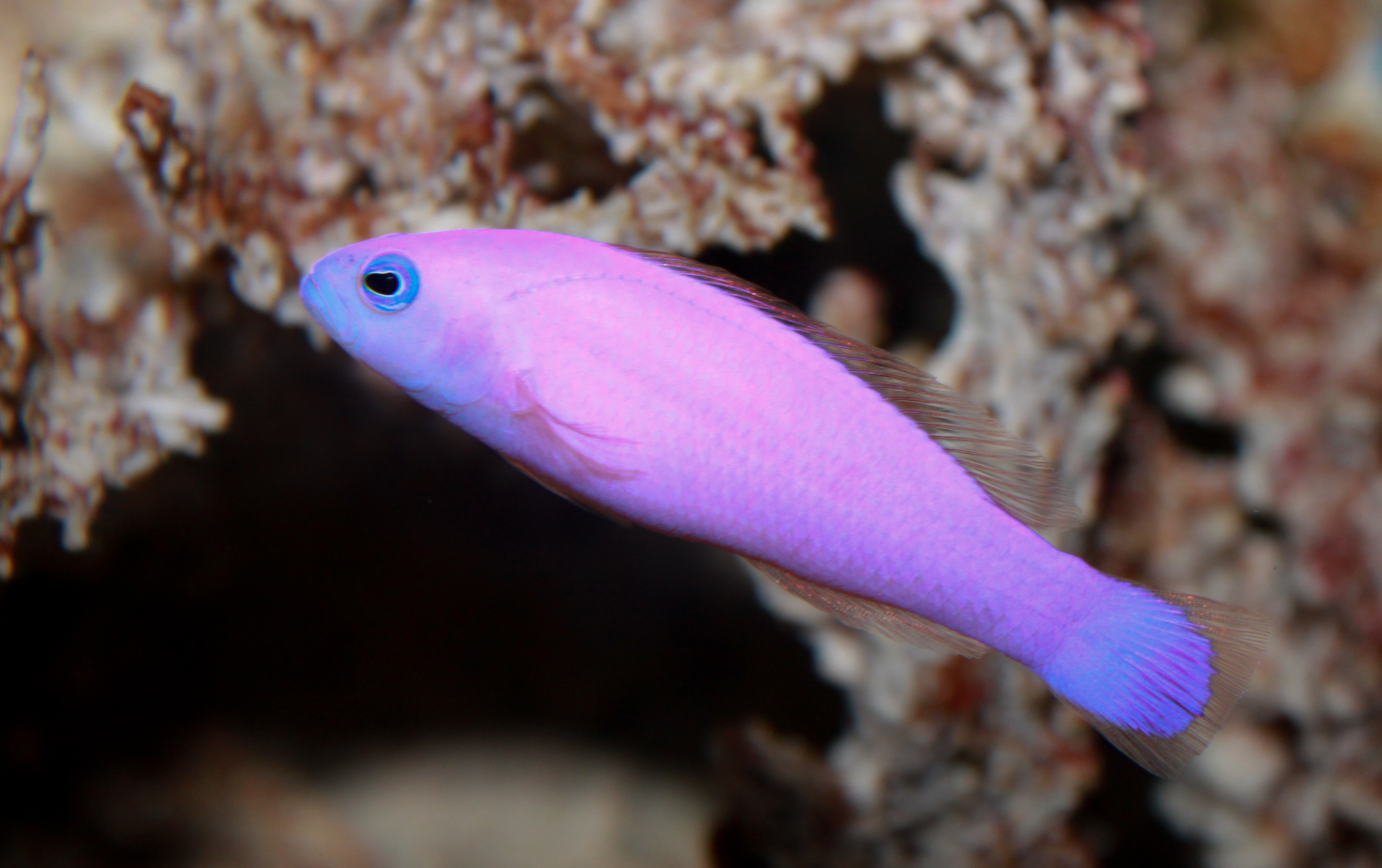
- Magenta dottyback Pictichromis porphyrea

Scientific classification
- Kingdom: Animalia
- Phylum: Chordata
- Class: Actinopterygii
- Order: Blenniiformes
- Family: Pseudochromidae
- Subfamily: Pseudochrominae
- Genus: Pictichromis; A. C. Gill, 2004

Type species
- Pseudochromis porphyreus Lubbock & Goldman, 1974

= Pictichromis =

Genus of fishes

Pictichromis is a genus of ray-finned fishes from the subfamily Pseudochrominae, which is one of four subfamilies in the dottyback family Pseudochromidae. They occur in the western and central Pacific Ocean.

== Species ==
There are eight species in the genus:

- Pictichromis aurifrons (Lubbock, 1980) (Gold-browed dottyback)
- Pictichromis caitlinae Allen, A. C. Gill & Erdmann, 2008 (Cenderawasih dottyback)
- Pictichromis coralensis A. C. Gill, 2004 (Bicoloured dottyback)
- Pictichromis diadema (Lubbock & Randall, 1978) (Diadem dottyback)
- Pictichromis dinar Randall & Schultz, 2009 (Dottyback)
- Pictichromis ephippiata (A. C. Gill, Pyle & Earle, 1996) (Saddled dottyback)
- Pictichromis paccagnellae (Axelrod, 1973) (Royal dottyback)
- Pictichromis porphyrea (Lubbock & Goldman, 1974) (Magenta dottyback)
