= Sanshin =

Ryukyuan musical instrument

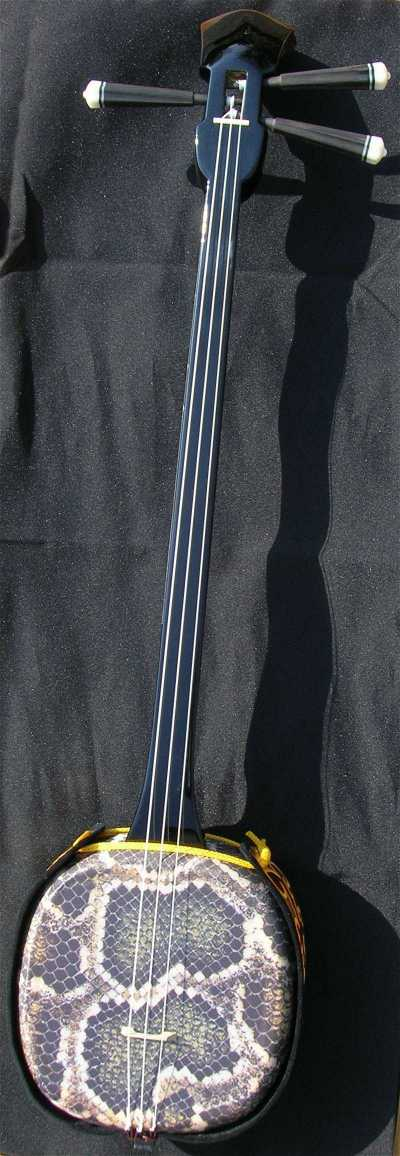
A sanshin

The sanshin (三線; lit. 'three strings', Okinawan: sanshin) is a Ryukyuan musical instrument and precursor of Japanese shamisen (三味線). Often likened to a banjo, it consists of a snakeskin-covered body, neck and three strings.

== Origins ==
The sanshin is believed to have originated from the Chinese instrument known as the sanxian, which was introduced to Okinawa through trade in the 15th century. Over time, the sanshin underwent unique modifications and developments in Okinawa and the Amami Islands, evolving into a distinct instrument. In the 16th century, the sanshin reached Japan, specifically the trading port of Sakai in Osaka. The sanshin was transformed into the shamisen in Japan, which spread throughout the country. As it reached various regions, the shamisen continued to be altered, resulting in variations such as the Tsugaru shamisen and Yanagawa shamisen. Among these, the gottan from Kyushu, retained many characteristics of the sanshin, distinguishing it from other derivatives such as the shamisen.

Played by youth as young as 2, to older people aged 100 or more, there is a sanshin in most Okinawan homes. It is the center of small informal family gatherings, weddings, birthdays, other celebrations, community parties, festivals.

The sanshin is held in great respect among the Ryukyuan culture, and is often viewed as an instrument that carries the voice of the deities, and is regarded as a deity itself. This is reflected in the traditional construction of the sanshin. Sanshin are generally designed to last more than a lifetime, as they are often passed down through the generations of a family.

A traditional Okinawan story, the tale of the 'Husband and Wife Sanshin', tells of a pair of sanshin made from the same core of Okinawan Ebony tree. They were owned by a husband and wife prior to World War II. At the onset of the war, the husband was forced into military service by the Japanese, and therefore had to leave his wife and home. Due to the destruction to main island during the war, the pair of sanshin were in danger, and the war wiped out almost half of the native population.

In an attempt to preserve his and his wife's sanshin, the husband wrapped them up, put them into a wooden box, and buried them deep in the Okinawan forest. Later, they were dug up, and brought back to their rightful home, having made it safely through the violent war. They are currently preserved by the son of the couple.

== Construction ==
Traditionally, the sanshin was covered with the skin of the Burmese python, but today, due to CITES regulations, the skin of the reticulated python is also used. Python skin is used for the skin of the body of the instrument, in contrast to the cat or dogskin used traditionally on the shamisen. Though Okinawa is famous for the venomous habu viper, the habu is in fact too small for its skin to be used to make sanshin, and it is believed that the snakeskin for the sanshin has always been imported from Southeast Asia.

Though the pythons used to make sanshin skins today are not an endangered species, the difficulty of distinguishing faux snakeskin from real snakeskin makes transporting real-snakeskin (hongawa) sanshin internationally somewhat risky. Due to international wildlife protection treaties, it is not legal to export snakeskin-covered sanshin to some countries, such as the United Kingdom and the United States. There is some room for interpretation of this, in that the treaties specify that the restriction is for endangered snake species.

Naturally-skinned instruments - while considered unparalleled in sound quality, producing a warm, deep yet pronounced tone - are infamous for cracking and tearing, especially when the sanshin is taken out of its natural habitat, the humid tropicality of the Ryukyu Islands. Up until recent times, skin breakage was never considered much of a problem, as the sanshin's construction allows for it to be fully disassembled, re-skinned, and reassembled, usually with little time, cost, and inconvenience, as a number of sanshin craftsmen were heavily dotted throughout the Prefecture.

When sanshin began to be exported across the world, skin breakages became a more prevalent issue, as no sanshin craftsmen existed outside of Okinawa, with Western luthiers unfamiliar with the construction of the instrument, or its use of natural skins. Sanshin exported to cold and/or dry countries have an increased vulnerability to skin cracks, tears and breaks, leading to the development of artificial sanshin skins made from a variety of materials, such as nylon and polyester. The quality, appearance, and price of these skins varies greatly, ranging from hard, thin-skinned, high-pitched and 'tinny'-sounding polyester skins, to the more 'snake-skin-sounding' nylon skins, which replicate the layered composition of natural snake skin. Artificially skinned sanshin are popular due to their generally low cost and their invulnerability to different temperatures and atmospheres. The highest-quality synthetic-skin sanshin, which are available for as low as US$300, are the go-to choice for professional Okinawan Folk Musicians who travel and play overseas.

These days, with the sanshin's popularity rapidly expanding all over the world, and the desire of players to have the most traditional sanshin possible, a hybrid skin known as the kyoka-bari style has been developed: a natural python skin is fitted to the sanshin and stretched with a strong, synthetic reinforcement fabric underneath. This proves a great compromise for those in dryer/colder/hotter climates. Like with its un-reinforced predecessor, it is still good practice to maintain regular oiling of the reinforced kyoka-bari skin to prevent over-drying and cracking. There are also tailor-made products available to avoid skin-breakage, such as naturally oily leather circular pads that are placed on either side of the sanshin body during case storage. This prevents over-drying which leads to breaking.

The wooden parts of the sanshin – the neck (sao), head/body (dou), and head (ten) – can be made with any of a large variety of hardwoods. Traditionally, the neck is crafted with the solid black core of the Okinawan Ebony tree, a species native to Okinawa, and the only ebony in the whole of Japan. This black ebony core is highly sought after for its strength and its traditional sound quality. Typically, Ebony trees no younger than 100 years old are used in sanshin construction - the time necessary for the tree to grow a big enough black core to produce one or more instrument necks.

Instruments made with Okinawan Ebony are among the most expensive sanshin made and sold today. Even Ebony instruments that forego authentic snakeskin for the cheaper and more durable nylon and polyester skins can be several times more expensive than an instrument made with other hardwoods.

The other, more common hardwoods (used mainly for convenience, availability, and cost-effectiveness) include Oak, Apitong, and Rosewoods (any number of species).

There are 3 strings, called Gen. They can be made of Nylon or Silk. They are first attached to the base of the Dou (head), at the point where the end of the neck pole sticks out. A silk thread-piece, known as an Itokake or Genkake is fitted onto the wood piece, then the strings are individually attached to the 3 loops of the Itokake, using a simple draw-thru knot. The other end of the string are brought up the body and neck, and are the individually wound onto their respective pegs, called Karakui. Itokake, once only available in Gold color, are now being made in a variety of colors, to match a variety of Doumaki.

Karakui, the tuning pegs, are generally made with whatever wood the neck is made from, but Ebony is most common, and desired for its strength. Acting much like the tuning pegs of the violin, cello, and other traditional western wood string instruments- Karakui will require the use of Rosin (made of Pine resin, oils, ash, etc.), after an initial period. The Rosin is applied as a thin and tacky layer, adding grip between the two wood pieces. Karakui are infamous for breaking with the slightest impetus, and are therefore readily available individually or in sets of 3. Karakui also act as another face of expression for the Sanshin- they can be carved in a variety of different styles and designs, and finished in a range of colors, textures, and some can even be 'tipped' with Jade, Coral, or other stones, shells, and natural decorations. Another part of Sanshin's body is susceptible to damage- and that is the head, or 'Ten'. It can be scratched, dented, or even completely broken off, if mishandled. A textile, simply called a Ten cover, is a small, elastic-reinforced slip-cover that is generally padded and quilted, to provide a bit of protection against surface damage. These Ten covers can be used at all times, or can be removed during play. Use during play will not effect sound quality. Ten covers come in as big of a variety as Doumaki, many made to match.

The finishing touch, and arguably 'the Soul' of every Sanshin, is the Doumaki- the decorative textile that surrounds the head of the Sanshin. Dou, meaning 'drum' and Maki, meaning 'Wrap'. Most often, Doumaki are made from modern fibers and methods, and display the Royal Crest of the Ryukyu Kingdom (Hidari Gomon), in rich black and gold. These days, a wide variety of both modern-made and traditional hand-woven Doumaki can be found both in Japan and by world citizens via the internet. They can range from US$10 (for traditional design and cheaper materials), all the way to US$175, for the magnificent hand-woven Doumaki, made with hand-spun silk or the famous Basho-fu, 'silk' made from the trunks of Okinawan Banana trees. These high-end Doumaki may also incorporate leather, python skin, Bingata fabric (Okinawan 'stencil & paste' dyeing), Minsaa weavings (traditional Ryukyu '4 & 5' Square patterns_ and other natural/modern materials.

In addition to synthetic skins, another modern cost-cutting adaptation is the 'New Wood' Sanshin- an instrument that abandons any type of 'skinning' of the body, and instead utilizes a thin panel of wood composite. This wood face is then finished and decorated in any number of fashions. This 'New Wood' design has pioneered the seemingly popular 'Sanshin Kit'. This 'DIY' kit generally includes pre-fabricated parts- the Sao/Neck, the Dou/drum head base, and the Karakui/tuning pegs- all of which come 'unfinished', awaiting the new owner's creative hands. Wood parts can be further sanded, stained/painted, oiled, lacquered, etc... whatever the heart desires. Kits come with a traditional Doumaki, but the die-hard artisan may choose to create their own unique, personally-designed textile. It seems that in recent times, with the US Dollar and the Japanese Yen not exactly being of equal value, the cost of shipping to countries outside of Asia, is higher than the cost of the Kits themselves.

A unique 'evolutionary-tangent' of the Sanshin came about just after the Battle of Okinawa- the deadliest action in the Pacific War. Civilians were corralled into US camps following the Battle, during the US take-over. The Okinawans, allowed to bring nothing with them, insisted upon carrying on musical and dancing arts so important to their culture. With the assistance of their US captors, and their rations, a new type of Sanshin was made- using a tin can, and most likely a broom pole. This changed everything for the downtrodden prisoners, bring a bit of peace and joy to their otherwise bleek situation. This war-born Sanshin is now called Kankara Sanshin, or 'Can-Sanshin, Can-shin, etc.'. It is also the subject of the 'DIY-Kit' approach to Sanshin

== Tuning ==
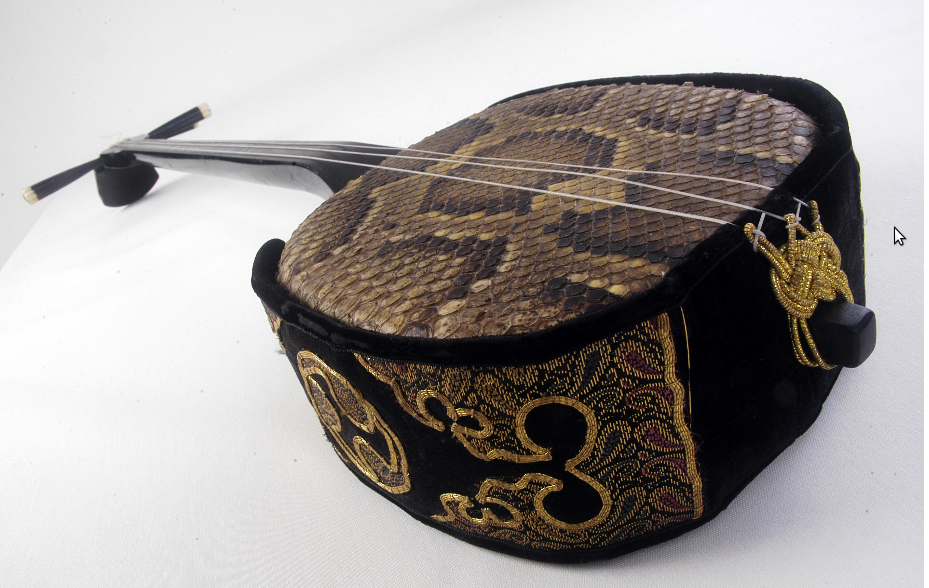
Museo Azzarini collection

Traditionally, players wear a plectrum (bachi), made of a material such as the water buffalo horn, on the index finger. Today, some use a guitar pick or the nail of the index finger. In Amami, long, narrow bamboo plectra are also used, which allow a higher-pitched tone than that of the Okinawa sanshin.

A bamboo bridge raises the strings off the skin, which are white, except in Amami, where they are yellower and thinner. The traditional names for the strings are (from thick to thin) uujiru (男絃, "male string"), nakajiru (中絃, "middle string"), and miijiru (女絃, "female string"). The sanshin has five tunings called chindami (ちんだみ):

- Hon chōshi (本調子) – "standard tuning" (i.e. C_{3}, F_{3}, C_{4} expressed in terms of international pitch notation)
- Ichi-agi chōshi (一揚調子) – "first-string raised tuning" (i.e. E♭_{3}, F_{3}, C_{4})
- Ni-agi chōshi (二揚調子) – "second-string raised tuning" (i.e. C_{3}, G_{3}, C_{4})
- Ichi, ni-agi chōshi (一、二揚調子) – "first- and second-strings raised tuning" (i.e. D_{3}, G_{3}, C_{4})
- San-sage chōshi (三下げ調子) – "third-string lowered tuning" (i.e. C_{3}, F_{3}, B♭_{3})

== Musical notation ==
Sheet music for the sanshin is written in a unique transcription system called kunkunshi (Okinawan: 工工四, pronounced [kuŋkunshiː]). It is named for the first three notes of Chinese melody that was widely known during its development. Its creator is believed to be Mongaku Terukina or his student Choki Yakabi (屋嘉比 朝寄, Yakabi Chōki) in the early to mid-1700s. A set of kanji are used to represent specific finger positions. Unlike European musical notation, kunkunshi can only be interpreted specifically through the sanshin .

== See also ==
- Gottan
- Kankara
- Ryukyuan music
- Shamisen
- Sanxian
- List of Traditional Crafts of Japan
