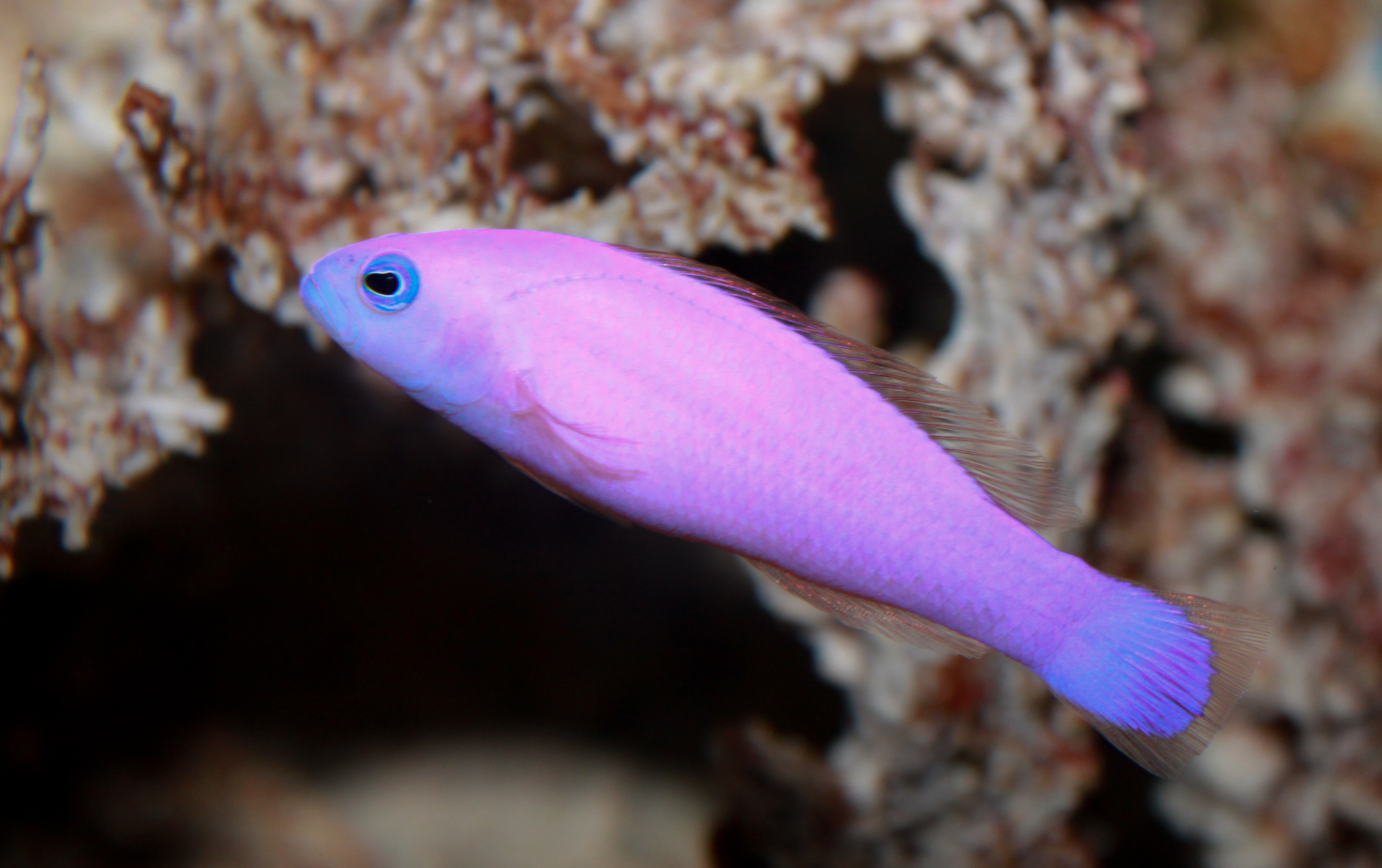

Conservation status
- Least Concern (IUCN 3.1)

Scientific classification
- Kingdom: Animalia
- Phylum: Chordata
- Class: Actinopterygii
- Order: Blenniiformes
- Family: Pseudochromidae
- Genus: Pictichromis
- Species: P. porphyrea

Binomial name
- Pictichromis porphyrea (Lubbock & Goldman, 1974)

Synonyms
- Pseudochromis porphyreus Lubbock & Goldman, 1974

= Pictichromis porphyrea =

Species of fish

Pictichromis porphyrea, the magenta dottyback, is a fish in the dottyback family from the western Pacific. It can be found from the Philippines to Samoa, extending north to the Ryukyu Islands and south to the Moluccas and Admiralty Islands. It occasionally makes its way into the aquarium trade. It grows to a size of 6 cm (2.4 in) in length.
