= Gottan =

Japanese musical instrument

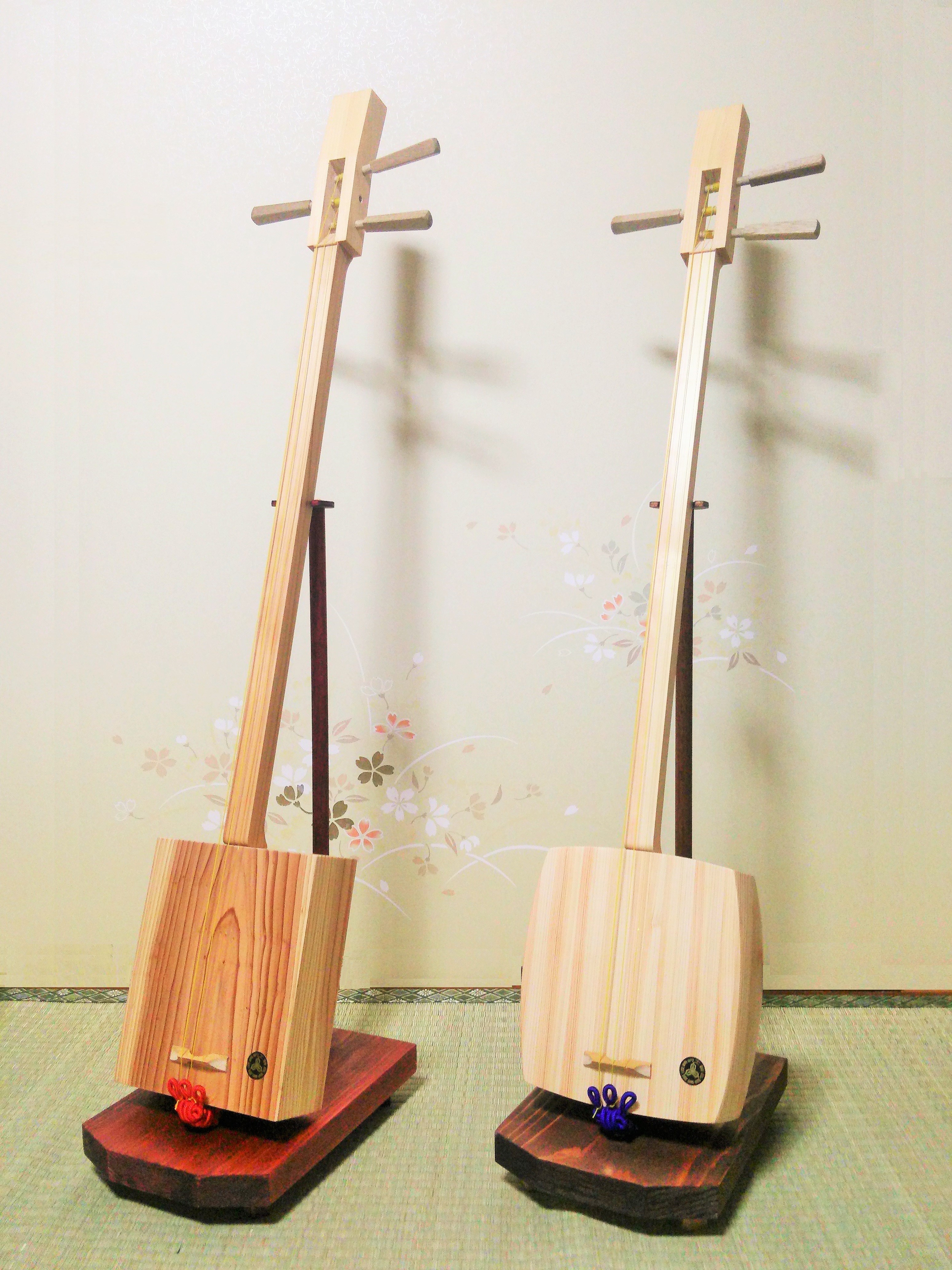
Two gottan

The gottan (Hiragana: ごったん), also known as the hako shamisen ("box shamisen") or ita shamisen ("board shamisen"), is a traditional Japanese three-stringed plucked instrument, often regarded as either a relative or derivative of the sanshin, itself a relative of the shamisen.

The gottan is primarily performed publicly in the Kyushu region, especially in prefectures of Kagoshima and Miyazaki.

== Overview ==
The gottan has been preserved as a form of entertainment since around the 1500s, primarily serving as an accompaniment instrument for traditional folk songs (min'yō). It spread widely across various regions of Kyushu as a musical instrument of the common people.

In addition to its use among the general public, it was also played by Buddhist monks and in kagura rituals at Shinto shrines, making it an integral part of daily life in medieval Kyushu. It is considered one of the representative instruments of the region.

Through cultural exchange with the Ryukyu Kingdom (present-day Okinawa), the gottan has incorporated elements of Ryukyuan music, particularly due to its compatibility with the sanshin. As such, it is regarded as an instrument influenced by Okinawan musical traditions.

Although the number of players and makers has declined in recent years, gottan classes still exist in various parts of Kyushu, such as Kagoshima, Miyazaki, and Fukuoka, in efforts to preserve local identity. Thanks to these efforts, many young performers have taken up the instrument, which continues to be played by people of all ages.

== Differences ==
The major difference between a sanshin and a gottan is that the body of a sanshin tends to be made of a hollowed wooden cavity covered with a type of membrane, whereas the whole of a gottan – body, neck, and all – is made up of solid wood, usually of a single type, often Japanese cedar.

The gottan's musical repertoire is often light and cheerful, including many folk songs. Like the shamisen, it was used for door-to-door musical busking, known as kadozuke.

Often the gottan is compared to the kankara sanshin, an Okinawan instrument related to the sanshin, due to its relative inexpensiveness (made from a used metal can) and ease of construction. The equivalent all-wood Okinawan instrument is the ita sanshin.
