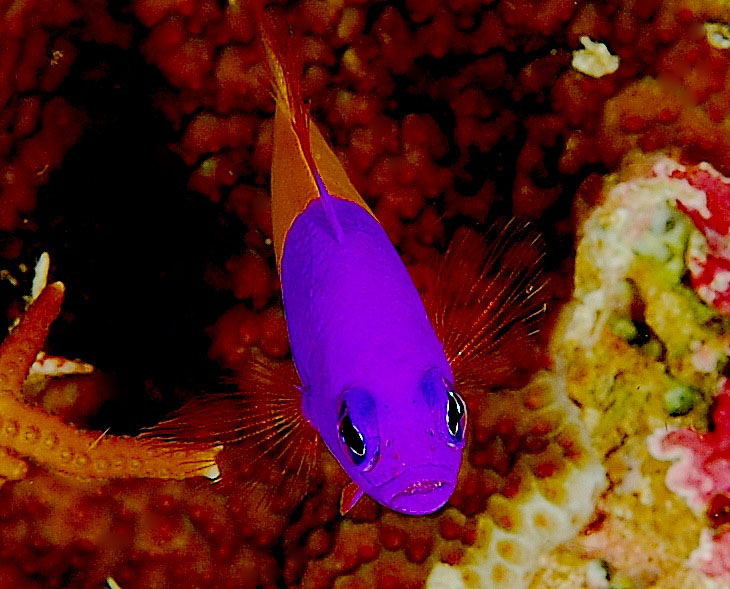

Conservation status
- Least Concern (IUCN 3.1)

Scientific classification
- Kingdom: Animalia
- Phylum: Chordata
- Class: Actinopterygii
- Order: Blenniiformes
- Family: Pseudochromidae
- Genus: Pictichromis
- Species: P. paccagnellae

Binomial name
- Pictichromis paccagnellae (Axelrod, 1973)

Synonyms
- Pseudochromis paccagnellae Axelrod, 1973

= Pictichromis paccagnellorum =

Species of fish

The royal dottyback (Pictichromis paccagnellorum), also called the bicolor dottyback, gramma dotty or false gramma is a fish commonly kept in marine aquariums. The front of the fish is bright purple and the posterior is yellow. In an aquarium, it will grow up to three inches long. The dottyback will defend its territory against fish several times its size, but gets along with many other common aquarium fish. It is sometimes mistaken for a royal gramma (Gramma loreto).

The specific name honours the Paccagnella family of Bologna who were wholesalers of aquarium fish and who gave the type to the author, Herbert R. Axelrod.

It can grow up to 6 cm in length.
