= Pterorhodin =

Pteridine pigment

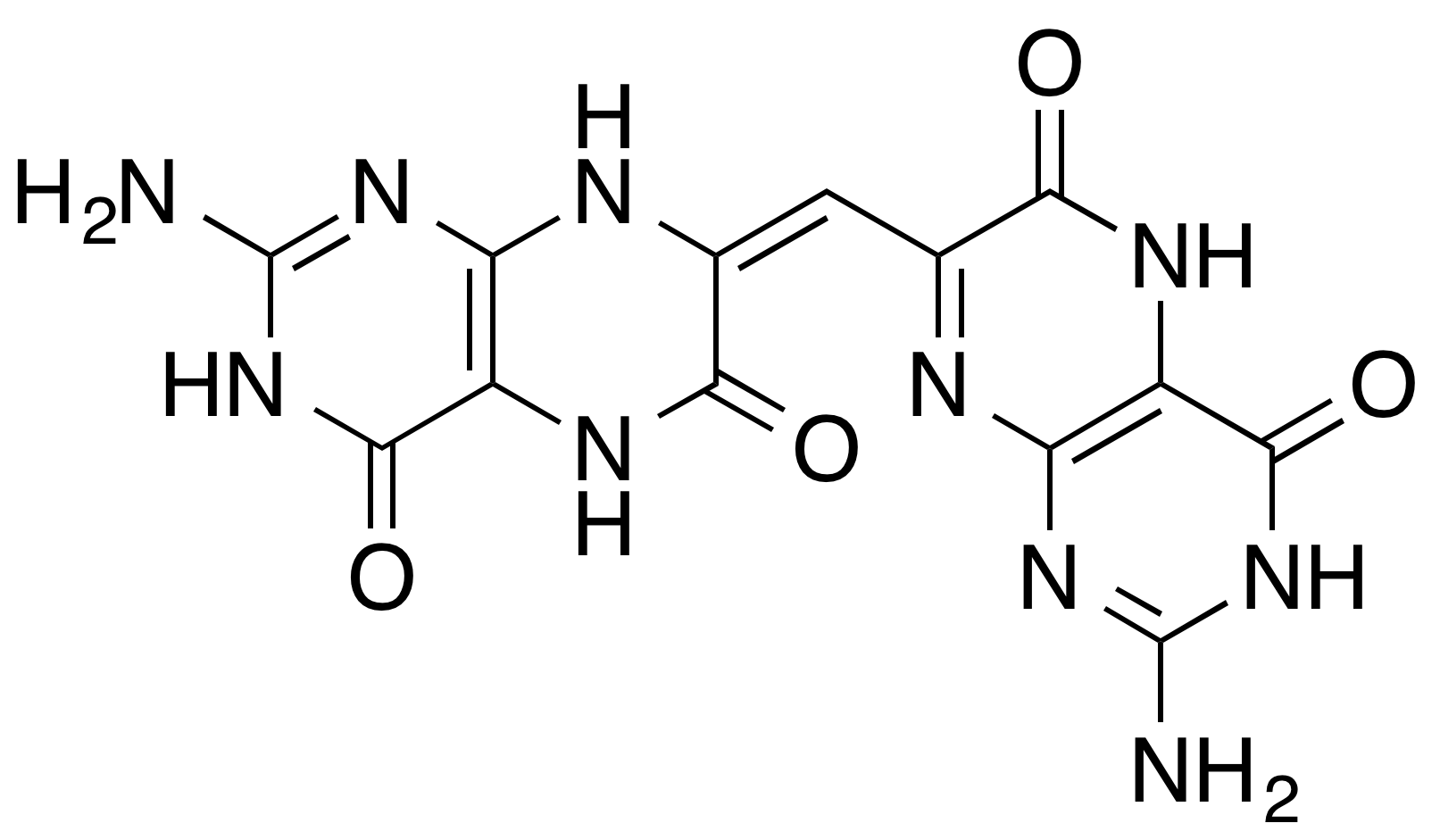

Names
- IUPAC name 2-Amino-7-[(E)-(2-amino-4,6-dioxo-5,8-dihydro-3H-pteridin-7-ylidene)methyl]-3,5-dihydropteridine-4,6-dione

Identifiers
CAS Number	6538-79-0
3D model (JSmol)	Interactive image
ChemSpider	107563089
MeSH	pterorhodin
PubChem CID	136864975
- InChI: InChI=1S/C13H10N10O4/c14-12-20-6-4(10(26)22-12)18-8(24)2(16-6)1-3-9(25)19-5-7(17-3)21-13(15)23-11(5)27/h1H,(H,18,24)(H,19,25)(H3,14,16,20,22,26)(H4,15,17,21,23,27)/b3-1+ Key: STEFGLSLWLJVLH-HNQUOIGGSA-N
- SMILES: C(=C/1\C(=O)NC2=C(N1)N=C(NC2=O)N)\C3=NC4=C(C(=O)NC(=N4)N)NC3=O

Properties
Chemical formula	C_{13}H_{10}N_{10}O_{4}
Molar mass	370.289 g·mol^{−1}
- Except where otherwise noted, data are given for materials in their standard state (at 25 °C [77 °F], 100 kPa). verify (what is ?) Infobox references

Pterorhodin is a pteridine pigment found in animals and plants. It has been extracted in melanosomes of tree frogs, butterflies, and plants as a wine red pigment. In lemur tree frogs, pterorhodin allows skin to reflect the sun's heat. Pterorhodin gives pigment color to bristle worms and is found in the iris of multiple bird species including the red-eyed vireo and the common loon.
