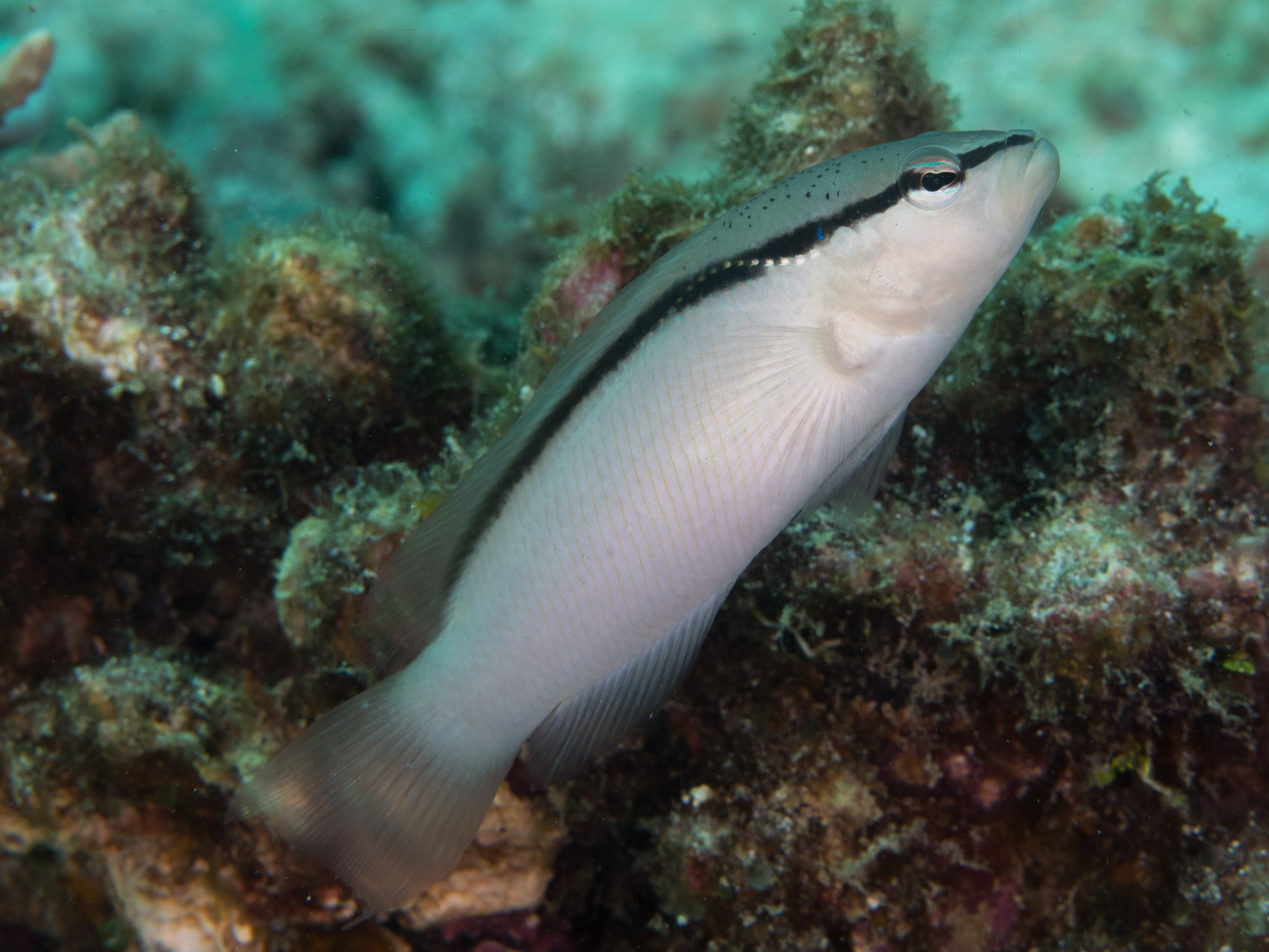

Conservation status
- Least Concern (IUCN 3.1)

Scientific classification
- Kingdom: Animalia
- Phylum: Chordata
- Class: Actinopterygii
- Order: Blenniiformes
- Family: Pseudochromidae
- Genus: Pseudochromis
- Species: P. perspicillatus

Binomial name
- Pseudochromis perspicillatus Günther, 1862

= Pseudochromis perspicillatus =

Species of fish

Pseudochromis perspicillatus, the Southeast Asian blackstripe dottyback, or bandit dottyback, is a species of ray-finned fish in the family Pseudochromidae. It is found in the western Pacific Ocean.

== Description ==
This species reaches a standard length of 12.0 cm (4.7 in).
