= Pseudochromis rutilus =

Scientific classification
- Kingdom: Animalia
- Phylum: Chordata
- Class: Actinopterygii
- Order: Blenniiformes
- Family: Pseudochromidae
- Genus: Pseudochromis
- Species: P. rutilus

Binomial name
- Pseudochromis rutilus A. C. Gill, G. R. Allen & Erdmann, 2012

Species of fish

Pseudochromis rutilus the red-gold dottyback, is a species of ray-finned fish in the family Pseudochromidae. It is found in the Indian Ocean around Indonesia.

== Description ==
Pseudochromis rutilus reaches a standard length of 5.5 cm (2.2 in).
