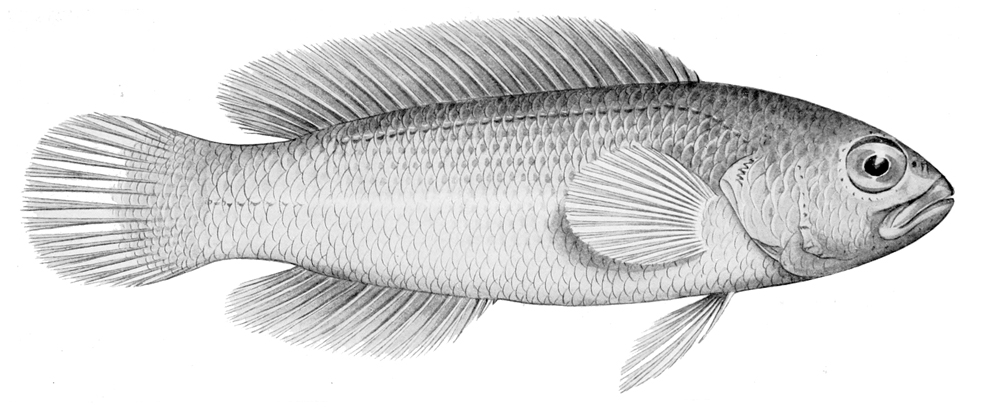

Scientific classification
- Kingdom: Animalia
- Phylum: Chordata
- Class: Actinopterygii
- Order: Blenniiformes
- Family: Pseudochromidae
- Genus: Pseudochromis
- Species: P. quinquedentatus

Binomial name
- Pseudochromis quinquedentatus McCulloch, 1926

= Pseudochromis quinquedentatus =

Species of fish

Pseudochromis quinquedentatus, also known as the spiny dottyback, is a species of ray-finned fish in the family Pseudochromidae. It is found in the Indo-Pacific Ocean.

== Description ==
This species reaches a length of 9.5 cm (3.7 in).
