= Pseudochromis cometes =

Scientific classification
- Kingdom: Animalia
- Phylum: Chordata
- Class: Actinopterygii
- Order: Blenniiformes
- Family: Pseudochromidae
- Genus: Pseudochromis
- Species: P. cometes

Binomial name
- Pseudochromis cometes A. C. Gill, J. E. Randall, 1998

Species of fish

Pseudochromis cometes the Commet dottyback, is a species of ray-finned fish in the family Pseudochromidae. It is found in the western-central Pacific Ocean.

== Description ==
Pseudochromis cometes reaches a standard length of 2.2 cm (0.87 in).
