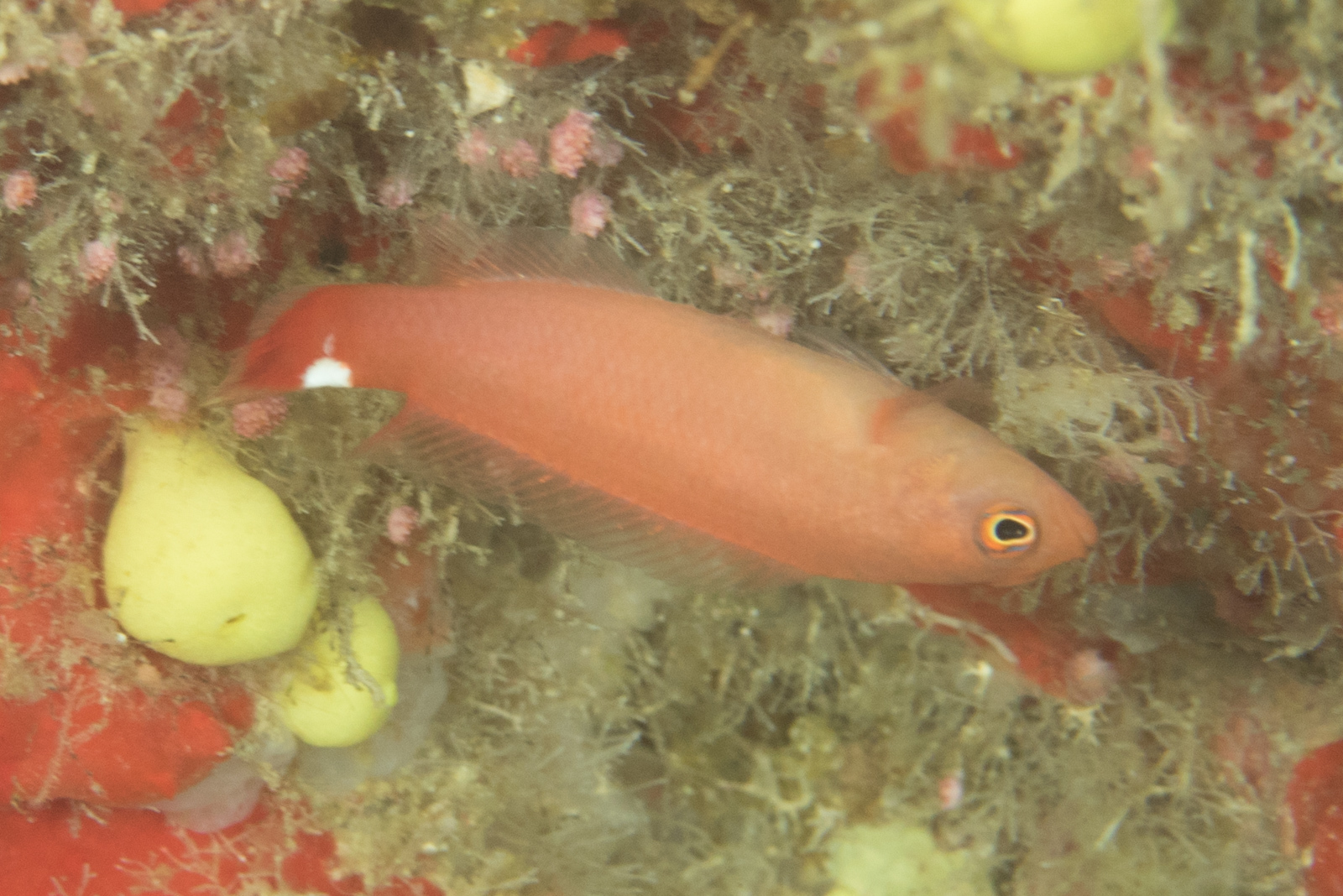
- Swimming upside-down near underwater cave roof.

Conservation status
- Least Concern (IUCN 3.1)

Scientific classification
- Kingdom: Animalia
- Phylum: Chordata
- Class: Actinopterygii
- Order: Blenniiformes
- Family: Pseudochromidae
- Genus: Pseudochromis
- Species: P. jamesi

Binomial name
- Pseudochromis jamesi L. P. Schultz, 1943

= Pseudochromis jamesi =

Species of fish

Pseudochromis jamesi, also known as the spot-tailed dottyback, is a species of ray-finned fish in the family Pseudochromidae. It is found in the Pacific Ocean.

== Description ==
This species reaches a standard length of 5.5 cm (2.2 in).
