= Pseudochromis pictus =

Scientific classification
- Kingdom: Animalia
- Phylum: Chordata
- Class: Actinopterygii
- Order: Blenniiformes
- Family: Pseudochromidae
- Genus: Pseudochromis
- Species: P. pictus

Binomial name
- Pseudochromis pictus A. C. Gill, J. E. Randall, 1998

Species of fish

Pseudochromis pictus, the painted dottyback, is a species of ray-finned fish in the family Pseudochromidae. It is found in the western-central Pacific Ocean.

== Description ==
Pseudochromis pictus reaches a standard length of 8.3 cm (3.3 in).
