= Pseudochromis jace =

Scientific classification
- Kingdom: Animalia
- Phylum: Chordata
- Class: Actinopterygii
- Order: Blenniiformes
- Family: Pseudochromidae
- Genus: Pseudochromis
- Species: P. jace

Binomial name
- Pseudochromis jace G. R. Allen, A. C. Gill & Erdmann, 2008

Species of fish

Pseudochromis jace, the zippered dottyback, is a species of ray-finned fish in the family Pseudochromidae. It is found in the western Pacific Ocean around New Guinea.

== Description ==
Pseudochromis jace reaches a standard length of 6.3 cm (2.5 in).

== Etymology ==
The fish is named for the four children of Lisa and Michael Anderson, using the first letter of each of their names to create the species name.
