= Pseudochromis colei =

Conservation status
- Data Deficient (IUCN 3.1)

Scientific classification
- Kingdom: Animalia
- Phylum: Chordata
- Class: Actinopterygii
- Order: Blenniiformes
- Family: Pseudochromidae
- Genus: Pseudochromis
- Species: P. colei

Binomial name
- Pseudochromis colei Herre, 1933

Species of fish

Pseudochromis colei, the false bandit dottyback, is a species of ray-finned fish in the family Pseudochromidae. It is found in the Philippines.

== Description ==
This species reaches a standard length of 4.1 cm (1.6 in).
