= Pseudochromis leucorhynchus =

Conservation status
- Least Concern (IUCN 3.1)

Scientific classification
- Kingdom: Animalia
- Phylum: Chordata
- Class: Actinopterygii
- Order: Blenniiformes
- Family: Pseudochromidae
- Genus: Pseudochromis
- Species: P. leucorhynchus

Binomial name
- Pseudochromis leucorhynchus Lubbock, 1977

Species of fish

Pseudochromis leucorhynchus, or the white-nosed dottyback, is a species of ray-finned fish from the Western Indian Ocean: from Oman to Kenya, and the Socotra Archipelago. It is a member of the family Pseudochromidae. This species reaches a length of 9 cm (3.5 in).
