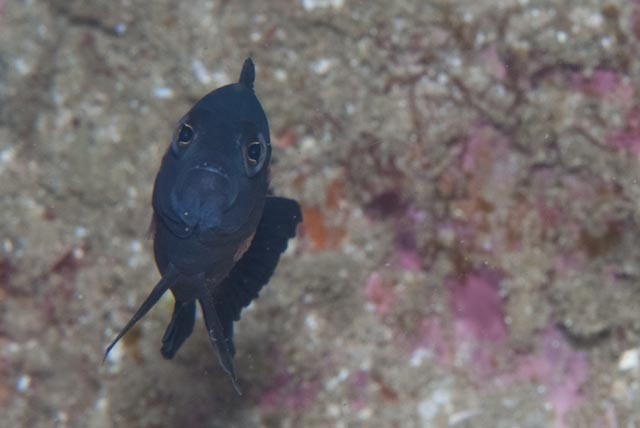

Conservation status
- Least Concern (IUCN 3.1)

Scientific classification
- Kingdom: Animalia
- Phylum: Chordata
- Class: Actinopterygii
- Order: Blenniiformes
- Family: Pseudochromidae
- Genus: Pseudochromis
- Species: P. melas

Binomial name
- Pseudochromis melas Lubbock, 1977

= Pseudochromis melas =

Species of fish

Pseudochromis melas, the dark dottyback, is a species of ray-finned fish from the Western Indian Ocean: From Kenya south to the Natal, South Africa, which is a member of the family Pseudochromidae. This species reaches a length of 8 cm (3.1 in).
