= Pseudochromis mooii =

Scientific classification
- Kingdom: Animalia
- Phylum: Chordata
- Class: Actinopterygii
- Division: Teleostei
- Order: Blenniiformes
- Family: Pseudochromidae
- Genus: Pseudochromis
- Species: P. mooii

Binomial name
- Pseudochromis mooii A.C. Gill, 2004

Species of fish

Pseudochromis mooii, the Mooi's dottyback, is a species of ray-finned fish from Indonesia, which is a member of the family Pseudochromidae. This species reaches a length of 4.9 cm (1.9 in).

== Etymology ==
The fish is named in honor of Randall D. Mooi, the Curator of Zoology at the Manitoba Museum in Winnipeg, Manitoba, Canada.
