= Pseudochromis fowleri =

Scientific classification
- Kingdom: Animalia
- Phylum: Chordata
- Class: Actinopterygii
- Order: Blenniiformes
- Family: Pseudochromidae
- Genus: Pseudochromis
- Species: P. fowleri

Binomial name
- Pseudochromis fowleri Herre, 1934

Species of fish

Pseudochromis fowleri, the Philippines dottyback, is a species of ray-finned fish in the family Pseudochromidae. It is found in the central-western Pacific Ocean.

== Description ==
This species reaches a standard length of 5.3 cm (2.1 in).
