= Pseudochromis omanensis =

Conservation status
- Data Deficient (IUCN 3.1)

Scientific classification
- Kingdom: Animalia
- Phylum: Chordata
- Class: Actinopterygii
- Order: Blenniiformes
- Family: Pseudochromidae
- Genus: Pseudochromis
- Species: P. omanensis

Binomial name
- Pseudochromis omanensis A. C. Gill & Mee, 1993

Species of fish

Pseudochromis omanensis, is a species of ray-finned fish in the family Pseudochromidae. It is found in the western Indian Ocean off central and southern Oman and the Socotra Archipelago.

== Description ==
Pseudochromis omanensis reaches a standard length of 12 cm (4.7 in).
