= Pseudochromis elongatus =

Scientific classification
- Kingdom: Animalia
- Phylum: Chordata
- Class: Actinopterygii
- Order: Blenniiformes
- Family: Pseudochromidae
- Genus: Pseudochromis
- Species: P. elongatus

Binomial name
- Pseudochromis elongatus Lubbock, 1980

Species of fish

Pseudochromis elongatus, the elongate dottyback', is a species of ray-finned fish from the Western Pacific which is a member of the family Pseudochromidae. It occasionally makes its way into the aquarium trade. It grows to a size of 6.5 cm in length.
