= Pseudochromis chrysospilus =

Conservation status
- Least Concern (IUCN 3.1)

Scientific classification
- Kingdom: Animalia
- Phylum: Chordata
- Class: Actinopterygii
- Order: Blenniiformes
- Family: Pseudochromidae
- Genus: Pseudochromis
- Species: P. chrysospilus

Binomial name
- Pseudochromis chrysospilus A. C. Gill & Zajonz, 2011

Species of fish

Pseudochromis chrysospilus, the gold-spotted dottyback, is a species of ray-finned fish in the family Pseudochromidae. It is found in the Indian Ocean around the Socotra Archipelago.

== Description ==
Pseudochromis chrysospilus reaches a standard length of 5.6 cm (2.2 in).
