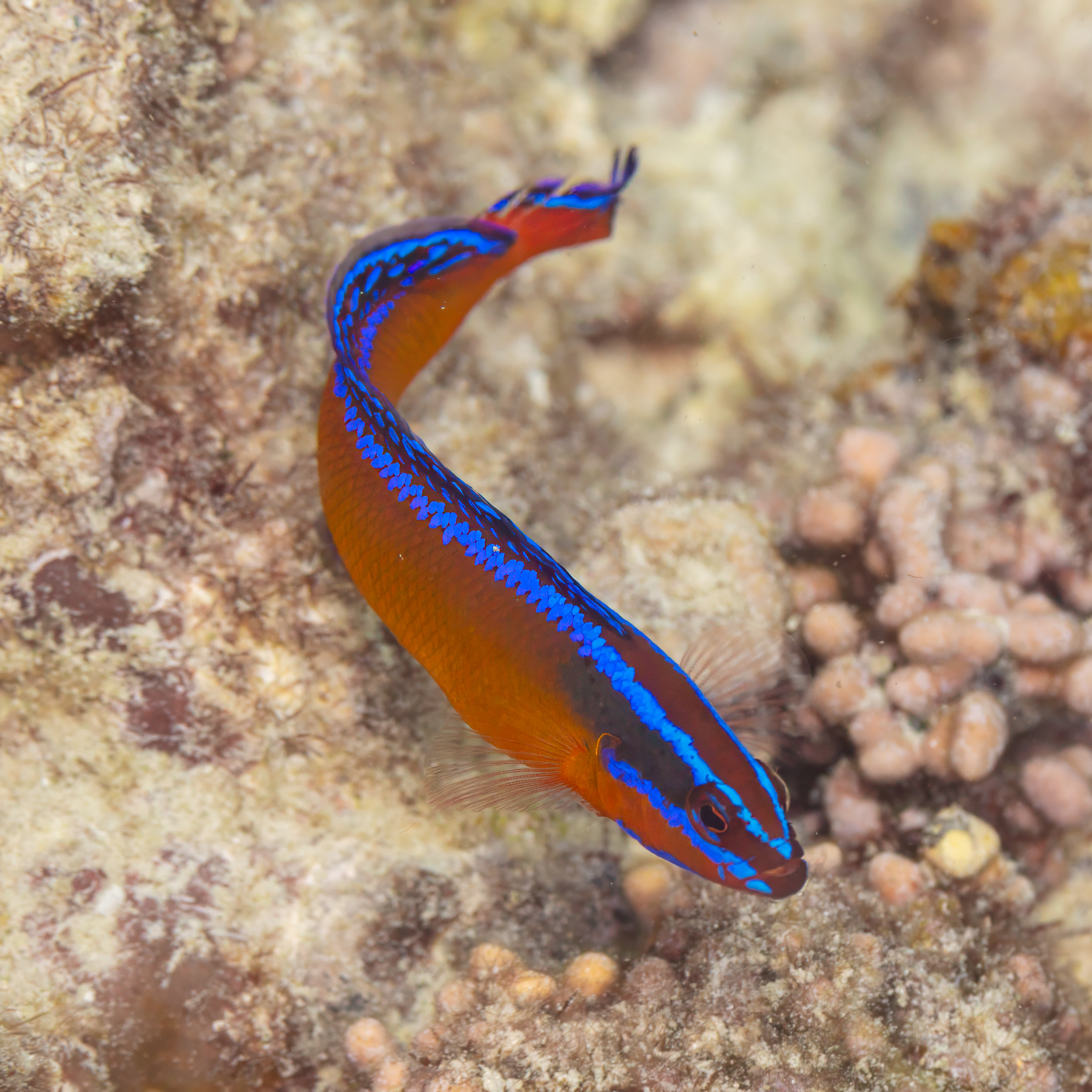

Conservation status
- Least Concern (IUCN 3.1)

Scientific classification
- Kingdom: Animalia
- Phylum: Chordata
- Class: Actinopterygii
- Division: Teleostei
- Order: Blenniiformes
- Family: Pseudochromidae
- Genus: Pseudochromis
- Species: P. aldabraensis

Binomial name
- Pseudochromis aldabraensis Bauchot-Boutin, 1958

= Pseudochromis aldabraensis =

Species of fish

Pseudochromis aldabraensis, the orange dottyback, neon dottyback, Arabian dottyback, or Arabian bluelined dottyback, is a species of ray-finned fish from the family Pseudochromidae, the dottybacks. It is commonly kept in marine aquariums.

== Distribution and habitat ==
Its natural range is in the western Indian Ocean around Aldabra, in the Gulf of Oman, the Persian Gulf as far east as India and Sri Lanka. It occurs on offshore coral and rocky reefs as deep as 25 metres (82 ft) where it is a secretive species which quickly hides if disturbed.

== Aquaculture ==
It is the hardier of the non-tank raised pseudochromises. They prefer to stay at the bottom of the tank. They get along extremely well with blue damsels and other kinds of damselfish. Otherwise, they can be fairly aggressive.
