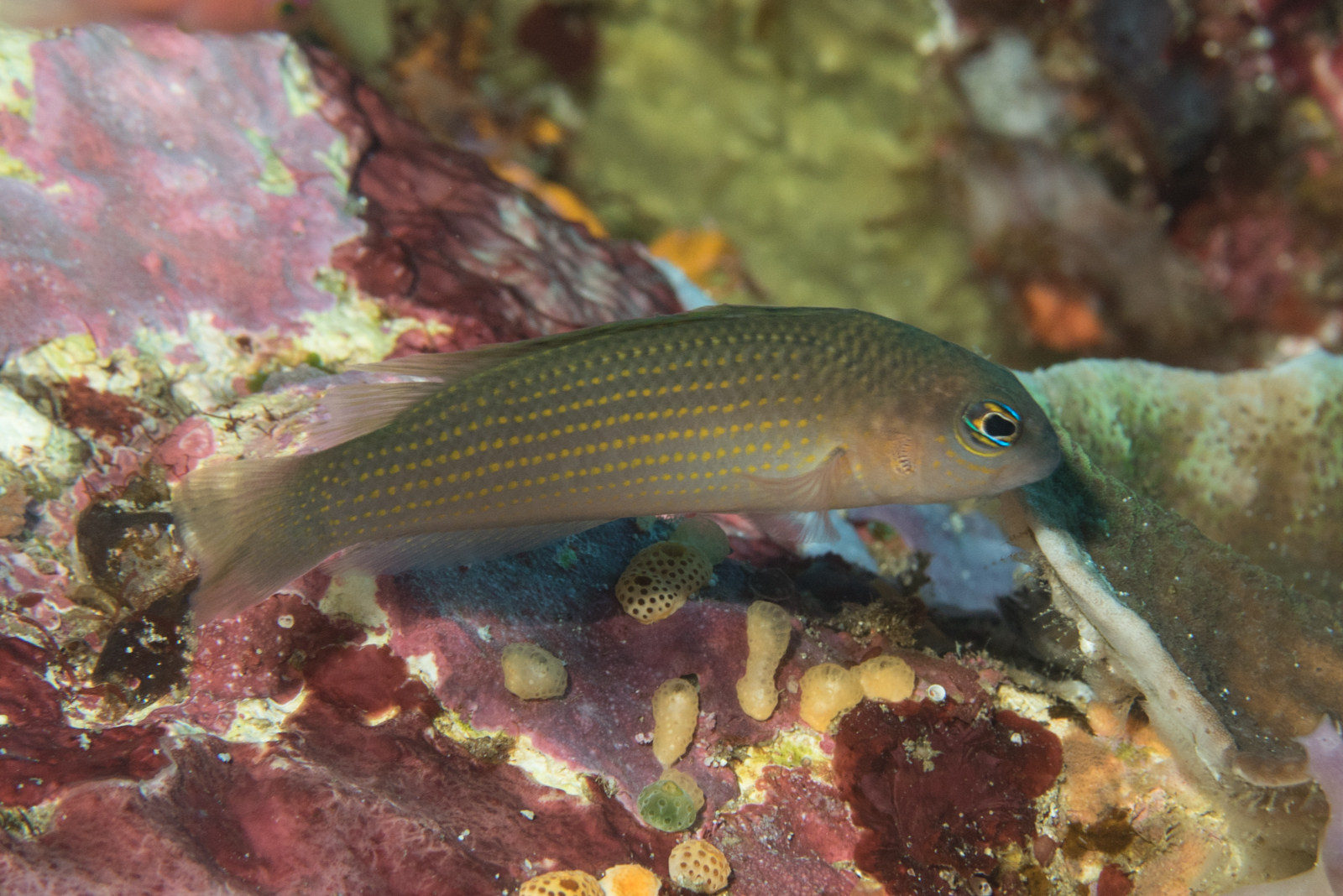
- Yellow-spotted Dottyback

Scientific classification
- Kingdom: Animalia
- Phylum: Chordata
- Class: Actinopterygii
- Order: Blenniiformes
- Family: Pseudochromidae
- Genus: Pseudochromis
- Species: P. flavopunctatus

Binomial name
- Pseudochromis flavopunctatus A. C. Gill & J. E. Randall, 1998

= Pseudochromis flavopunctatus =

Species of fish

Pseudochromis flavopunctatus the yellow-spotted dottyback, is a species of ray-finned fish in the family Pseudochromidae. It is found in the western-central Pacific Ocean.

== Description ==
Pseudochromis flavopunctatus reaches a total length of 6.8 cm (2.7 in).
