= Pseudochromis tonozukai =

Conservation status
- Least Concern (IUCN 3.1)

Scientific classification
- Kingdom: Animalia
- Phylum: Chordata
- Class: Actinopterygii
- Order: Blenniiformes
- Family: Pseudochromidae
- Genus: Pseudochromis
- Species: P. tonozukai

Binomial name
- Pseudochromis tonozukai A. C. Gill & G. R. Allen, 2004

Species of fish

Pseudochromis tonozukai, the spot-stripe dottyback, is a species of ray-finned fish in the family Pseudochromidae. It is found in the eastern Indian Ocean around Indonesia.

== Description ==
Pseudochromis tonozukai reaches a standard length of 6.3 cm (2.5 in).
