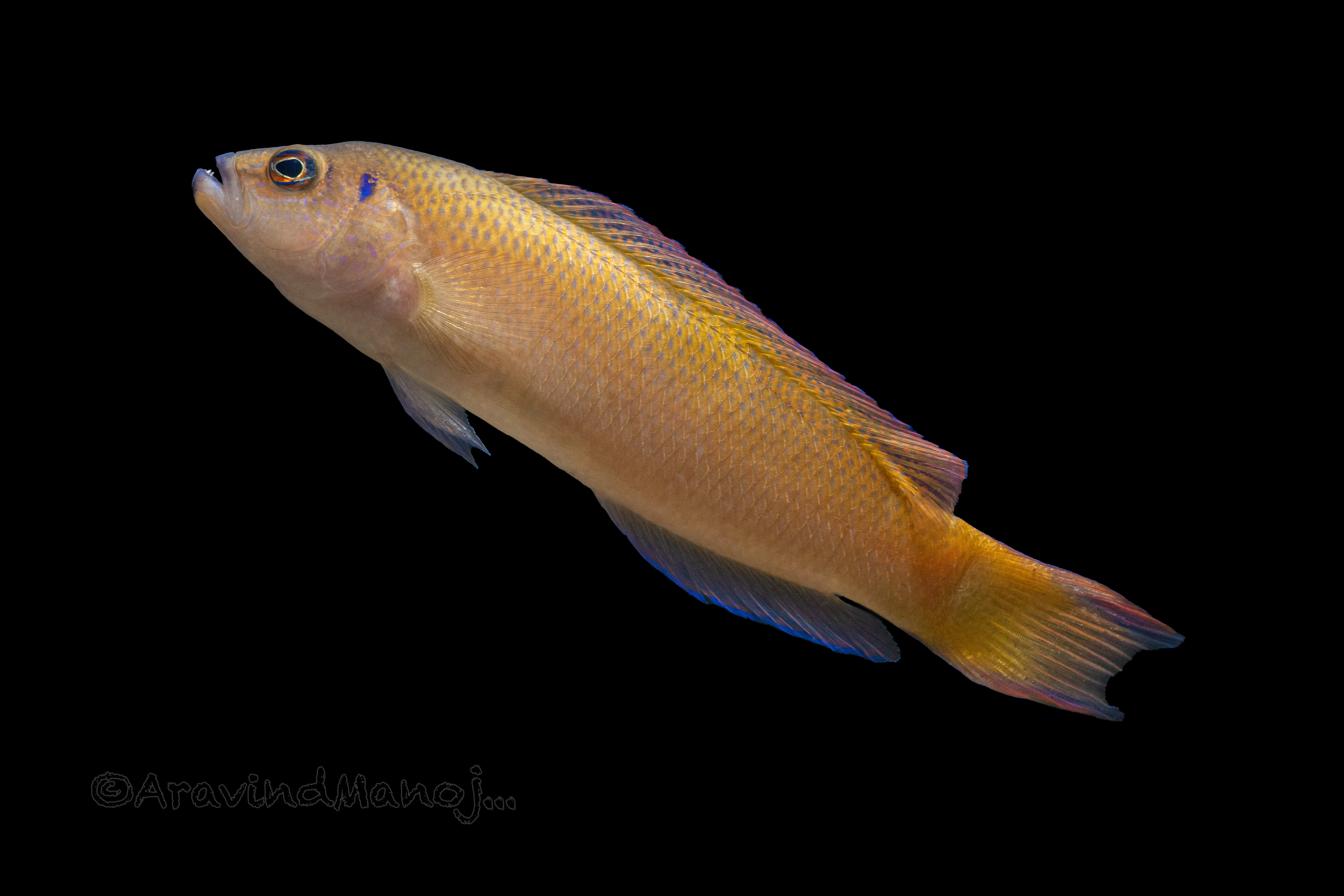

Conservation status
- Least Concern (IUCN 3.1)

Scientific classification
- Kingdom: Animalia
- Phylum: Chordata
- Class: Actinopterygii
- Order: Blenniiformes
- Family: Pseudochromidae
- Genus: Pseudochromis
- Species: P. caudalis

Binomial name
- Pseudochromis caudalis Boulenger, 1898

= Pseudochromis caudalis =

Species of fish

Pseudochromis caudalis, the stripe-tailed dottyback, is a species of ray-finned fish in the family Pseudochromidae. It is found in the Indian Ocean from Sri Lanka and southern India to the Gulf of Oman and the Strait of Hormuz.

== Description ==
Pseudochromis caudalis reaches a standard length of 11.0 cm (4.3 in).
