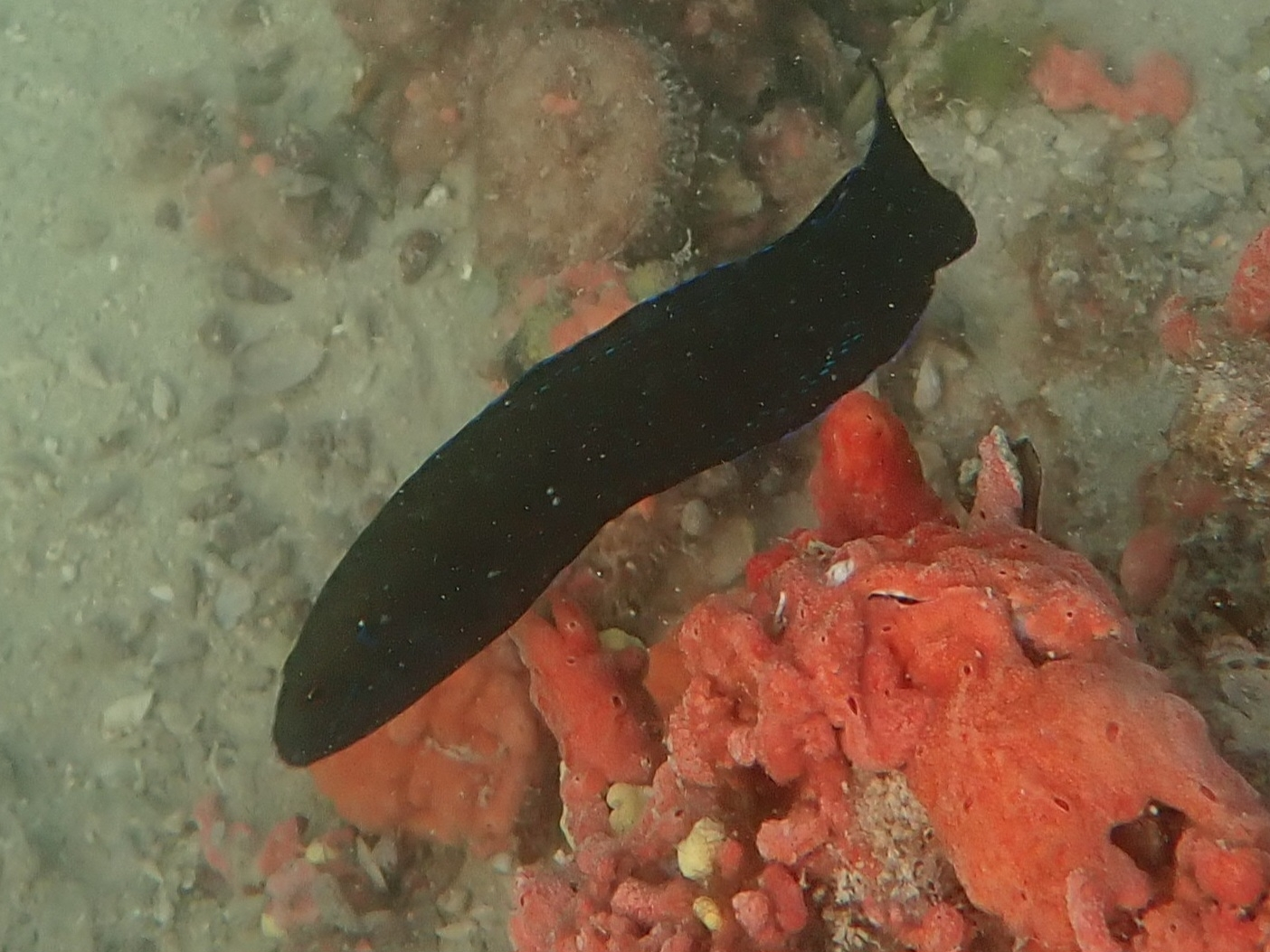

Conservation status
- Least Concern (IUCN 3.1)

Scientific classification
- Kingdom: Animalia
- Phylum: Chordata
- Class: Actinopterygii
- Order: Blenniiformes
- Family: Pseudochromidae
- Genus: Pseudochromis
- Species: P. persicus

Binomial name
- Pseudochromis persicus J. A. Murray, 1887

= Pseudochromis persicus =

Species of fish

Pseudochromis persicus, the bluespotted dottyback, is a species of ray-finned fish in the family Pseudochromidae. It is found in the western Indian Ocean.

== Description ==
This species reaches a standard length of 15.4 cm (6.1 in).
