= Pseudochromis pylei =

Conservation status
- Data Deficient (IUCN 3.1)

Scientific classification
- Kingdom: Animalia
- Phylum: Chordata
- Class: Actinopterygii
- Order: Blenniiformes
- Family: Pseudochromidae
- Genus: Pseudochromis
- Species: P. pylei

Binomial name
- Pseudochromis pylei J. E. Randall & J. E. McCosker, 1989

Species of fish

Pseudochromis pylei, commonly known as Pyle's dottyback, is a species of ray-finned fish in the family Pseudochromidae. It is found in the western-central Pacific Ocean.

== Description ==
This species reaches a length of 8.0 cm (3.1 in).

== Etymology ==
The fish is named for Robert M. Pyle, a travel agent, for helping collect and photograph fishes, including an underwater photograph of this species.
