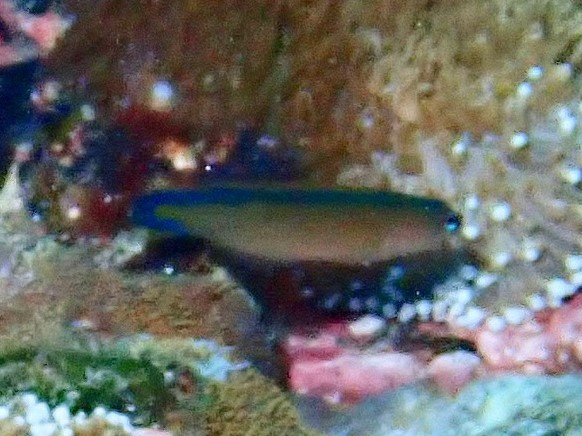
- Male

Conservation status
- Least Concern (IUCN 3.1)

Scientific classification
- Kingdom: Animalia
- Phylum: Chordata
- Class: Actinopterygii
- Order: Blenniiformes
- Family: Pseudochromidae
- Genus: Pseudochromis
- Species: P. tapeinosoma

Binomial name
- Pseudochromis tapeinosoma Bleeker, 1853

= Pseudochromis tapeinosoma =

Species of fish

Pseudochromis tapeinosoma, the blackmargin dottyback or horseshoe-tailed dottyback, is a species of ray-finned fish in the family Pseudochromidae. It is found in the north-western Indo-Pacific Ocean around Australia.

== Description ==
This species reaches a standard length of 7.4 cm (2.9 in).
