= Pseudochromis striatus =

Scientific classification
- Kingdom: Animalia
- Phylum: Chordata
- Class: Actinopterygii
- Order: Blenniiformes
- Family: Pseudochromidae
- Genus: Pseudochromis
- Species: P. striatus

Binomial name
- Pseudochromis striatus A. C. Gill, K. T. Shao & J. P. Chen, 1995

Species of fish

Pseudochromis striatus, the striated dottyback, is a species of ray-finned fish in the family Pseudochromidae. It is found in the western Pacific Ocean, including the Philippines, Taiwan and the Ryukyu Islands.

== Description ==
This species reaches a standard length of 3.2 cm (1.3 in).
