= P. aureus =

P. aureus may refer to:

- Paradoxurus aureus, the golden wet-zone palm civet, a carnivore endemic to Sri Lanka.
- Pipanacoctomys aureus, the golden Vizcacha rat, a rodent species only known from Catamarca Province of northwestern Argentina
- Plectrurus aureus, the Kerala shieldtail, a snake species found in the Western Ghats
- Poecilmitis aureus, a butterfly species endemic to South Africa
- Pseudochromis aureus, the brown dottyback or yellow pseudochromis, a wide-ranging saltwater fish from the Indo-Pacific

== Synonyms ==
- Paraphydippus aureus, a synonym for Paraphidippus aurantius, a jumping spider species
- Phaseolus aureus, the former name of Vigna radiata, the mung bean, a plant species

== See also ==
- Aureus (disambiguation)
