= Pseudochromis alticaudex =

Scientific classification
- Kingdom: Animalia
- Phylum: Chordata
- Class: Actinopterygii
- Order: Blenniiformes
- Family: Pseudochromidae
- Genus: Pseudochromis
- Species: P. alticaudex

Binomial name
- Pseudochromis alticaudex A. C. Gill, 2004

Species of fish

Pseudochromis alticaudex, the spot-breast dottyback, is a species of ray-finned fish from the Western Pacific: the east part of Indonesia, Papua New Guinea and the Solomon Islands, and is a member of the family Pseudochromidae. This species reaches a length of 4.6 cm (1.8 in).
