= Pseudochromis lugubris =

Scientific classification
- Kingdom: Animalia
- Phylum: Chordata
- Class: Actinopterygii
- Order: Blenniiformes
- Family: Pseudochromidae
- Genus: Pseudochromis
- Species: P. lugubris

Binomial name
- Pseudochromis lugubris A. C. Gill & G. R. Allen, 2004

Species of fish

Pseudochromis lugubris, also known as the mournful dottyback, is a species of ray-finned fish in the family Pseudochromidae. It is found in the western Pacific Ocean around New Guinea.

== Description ==
Pseudochromis lugubris reaches a standard length of 8.2 cm (3.2 in).
