= Pseudochromis socotraensis =

Conservation status
- Least Concern (IUCN 3.1)

Scientific classification
- Kingdom: Animalia
- Phylum: Chordata
- Class: Actinopterygii
- Order: Blenniiformes
- Family: Pseudochromidae
- Genus: Pseudochromis
- Species: P. socotraensis

Binomial name
- Pseudochromis socotraensis A. C. Gill & Zajonz, 2011

Species of fish

Pseudochromis socotraensis, the Socotra dottyback, is a species of ray-finned fish in the family Pseudochromidae. It is found in the Indian Ocean around the Socotra Archipelago.

== Description ==
Pseudochromis socotraensis reaches a standard length of 3.5 cm (1.4 in).
