= Pseudochromis melanurus =

Scientific classification
- Kingdom: Animalia
- Phylum: Chordata
- Class: Actinopterygii
- Division: Teleostei
- Order: Blenniiformes
- Family: Pseudochromidae
- Genus: Pseudochromis
- Species: P. melanurus

Binomial name
- Pseudochromis melanurus A.C. Gill, 2004

Species of fish

Pseudochromis melanurus, the black-tail dottyback, is a species of ray-finned fish from Tonga and Fiji in the Pacific Ocean, which is a member of the family Pseudochromidae. This species reaches a length of 4.0 cm (1.6 in).
