= Pseudochromis aureolineatus =

Scientific classification
- Kingdom: Animalia
- Phylum: Chordata
- Class: Actinopterygii
- Order: Blenniiformes
- Family: Pseudochromidae
- Genus: Pseudochromis
- Species: P. aureolineatus

Binomial name
- Pseudochromis aureolineatus A. C. Gill, 2004

Species of fish

Pseudochromis aureolineatus, the gold-lined dottyback, is a species of ray-finned fish from the Comores and Indonesia in the Indian Ocean, which is a member of the family Pseudochromidae. This species reaches a length of 7.1 cm (2.8 in).
