= Pseudochromis punctatus =

Conservation status
- Least Concern (IUCN 3.1)

Scientific classification
- Domain: Eukaryota
- Kingdom: Animalia
- Phylum: Chordata
- Class: Actinopterygii
- Order: Blenniiformes
- Family: Pseudochromidae
- Genus: Pseudochromis
- Species: P. punctatus

Binomial name
- Pseudochromis punctatus Kotthaus, 1970

Synonyms
- Pseudochromis melanotus Lubbock, 1975

Species of fish

Pseudochromis punctatus, also known as the blackback dottyback, is a species of ray-finned fish in the family Pseudochromidae. It is native to the western Indian Ocean.

== Description ==
This species reaches a length of 10.4 cm (4.1 in).
