= Pseudochromis eichleri =

Conservation status
- Data Deficient (IUCN 3.1)

Scientific classification
- Kingdom: Animalia
- Phylum: Chordata
- Class: Actinopterygii
- Order: Blenniiformes
- Family: Pseudochromidae
- Genus: Pseudochromis
- Species: P. eichleri

Binomial name
- Pseudochromis eichleri A. C. Gill, G. R. Allen & Erdmann, 2012

Species of fish

Pseudochromis eichleri, also known as Eichler's dottyback, is a species of ray-finned fish in the family Pseudochromidae. It is found in the Pacific Ocean around Indonesia.

== Description ==
Pseudochromis eichleri reaches a standard length of 6.8 cm (2.7 in).

== Etymology ==
The fish is named for Dieter Eichler, who was the first to photograph the species.
