= Pseudochromis yamasakii =

Scientific classification
- Kingdom: Animalia
- Phylum: Chordata
- Class: Actinopterygii
- Order: Blenniiformes
- Family: Pseudochromidae
- Genus: Pseudochromis
- Species: P. yamasakii

Binomial name
- Pseudochromis yamasakii A. C. Gill & Senou, 2016

Species of fish

Pseudochromis yamasakii, the dottybelly dottyback, is a species of ray-finned fish in the family Pseudochromidae. It is found in the north-western Pacific Ocean around Japan.

== Description ==
Pseudochromis yamasakii reaches a standard length of 5.1 cm (2.0 in).

== Entymology ==
The fish is named for Kimihiro Yamasaki, who collected the holotype specimen and provided photographs of the new species.
