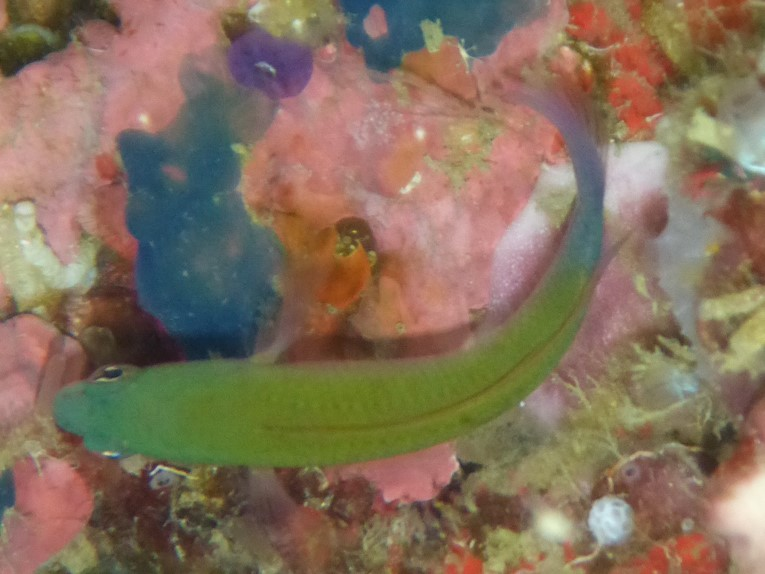

Scientific classification
- Kingdom: Animalia
- Phylum: Chordata
- Class: Actinopterygii
- Order: Blenniiformes
- Family: Pseudochromidae
- Genus: Pseudochromis
- Species: P. litus

Binomial name
- Pseudochromis litus A. C. Gill, J. E. Randall, 1998

= Pseudochromis litus =

Species of fish

Pseudochromis litus, the plain dottyback, is a species of ray-finned fish in the family Pseudochromidae. It is found in the western-central Pacific Ocean.

== Description ==
Pseudochromis litus reaches a standard length of 6.3 cm (2.5 in).
