= Pseudochromis olivaceus =

Conservation status
- Least Concern (IUCN 3.1)

Scientific classification
- Kingdom: Animalia
- Phylum: Chordata
- Class: Actinopterygii
- Division: Teleostei
- Order: Blenniiformes
- Family: Pseudochromidae
- Genus: Pseudochromis
- Species: P. olivaceus

Binomial name
- Pseudochromis olivaceus Rüppell, 1835

Species of fish

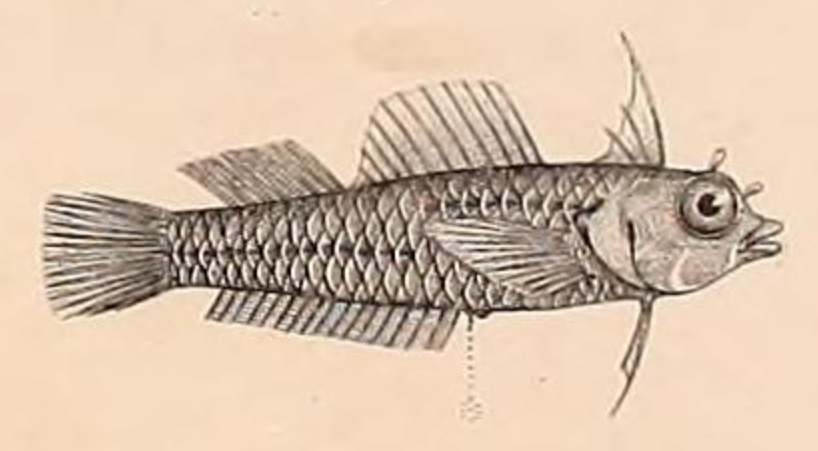
Historical illustration of Pseudocromis olivaceus

Pseudochromis olivaceus, the olive dottyback, is a species of ray-finned fish in the family Pseudochromidae. It is found in the western Indian Ocean.

== Description ==
This species reaches a standard length of 9.0 cm (3.5 in).
