= Pseudochromis nigrovittatus =

Conservation status
- Least Concern (IUCN 3.1)

Scientific classification
- Kingdom: Animalia
- Phylum: Chordata
- Class: Actinopterygii
- Order: Blenniiformes
- Family: Pseudochromidae
- Genus: Pseudochromis
- Species: P. nigrovittatus

Binomial name
- Pseudochromis nigrovittatus Boulenger, 1897

Species of fish

Pseudochromis nigrovittatus, the blackstripe dottyback, is a species of ray-finned fish in the family Pseudochromidae. It is found in the western Indian Ocean.

== Description ==
This species reaches a length of 9.0 cm (3.5 in)
