= Pseudochromis viridis =

Conservation status
- Least Concern (IUCN 3.1)

Scientific classification
- Kingdom: Animalia
- Phylum: Chordata
- Class: Actinopterygii
- Order: Blenniiformes
- Family: Pseudochromidae
- Genus: Pseudochromis
- Species: P. viridis

Binomial name
- Pseudochromis viridis A. C. Gill & G. R. Allen, 1996

Species of fish

Pseudochromis viridis, also known as the green dottyback, is a species of ray-finned fish in the family Pseudochromidae. It is found in the eastern Indian Ocean around Christmas Island.

== Description ==
Pseudochromis viridis reaches a standard length of 4.3 cm (1.7 in).
