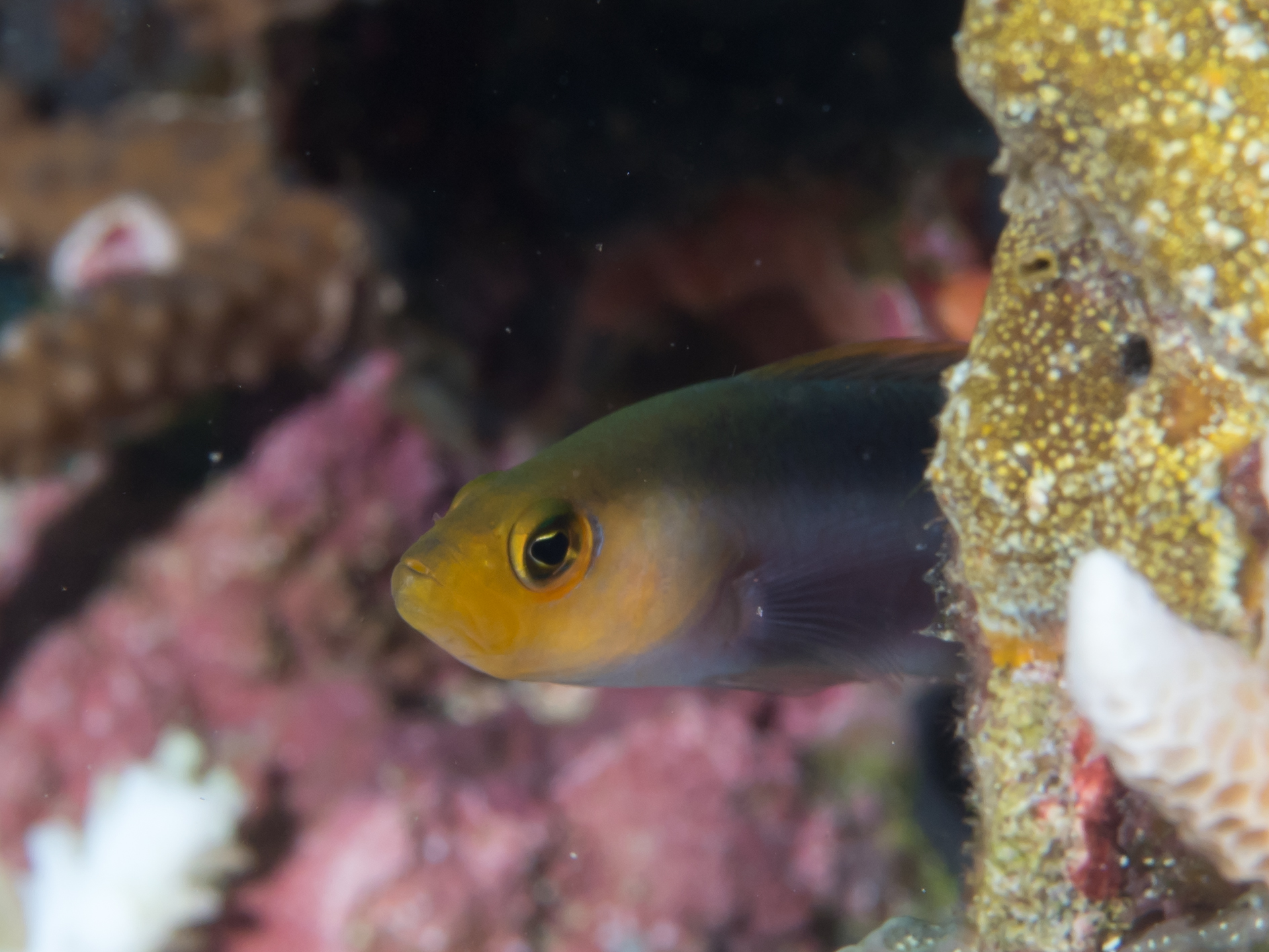

Conservation status
- Least Concern (IUCN 3.1)

Scientific classification
- Kingdom: Animalia
- Phylum: Chordata
- Class: Actinopterygii
- Order: Blenniiformes
- Family: Pseudochromidae
- Genus: Pseudochromis
- Species: P. bitaeniatus

Binomial name
- Pseudochromis bitaeniatus (Fowler, 1931)

= Pseudochromis bitaeniatus =

Species of fish

Pseudochromis bitaeniatus, the two-lined dottyback, double-striped dottyback, or slender dottyback, is a species of ray-finned fish in the family Pseudochromidae. It comes from the Indo-West Pacific. It occasionally makes its way into the aquarium trade. It grows to a size of 12 cm in length.

== See also ==
- List of marine aquarium fish species
