= Pseudochromis wilsoni =

Conservation status
- Least Concern (IUCN 3.1)

Scientific classification
- Kingdom: Animalia
- Phylum: Chordata
- Class: Actinopterygii
- Order: Blenniiformes
- Family: Pseudochromidae
- Genus: Pseudochromis
- Species: P. wilsoni

Binomial name
- Pseudochromis wilsoni (Whitley, 1929)

Synonyms
- Leptochromis tapeinosoma wilsoni Whitley, 1929

Species of fish

Pseudochromis wilsoni, the yellowfin dottyback, is a species of ray-finned fish in the family Pseudochromidae. It is found in Australia.

== Description ==
This species reaches a standard length of 8.0 cm (3.1 in).

== Entymology ==
The fish is named for Leonard Wilson of Darwin, Australia, who collected animals for the Australian Museum (Sydney), including fishes.
