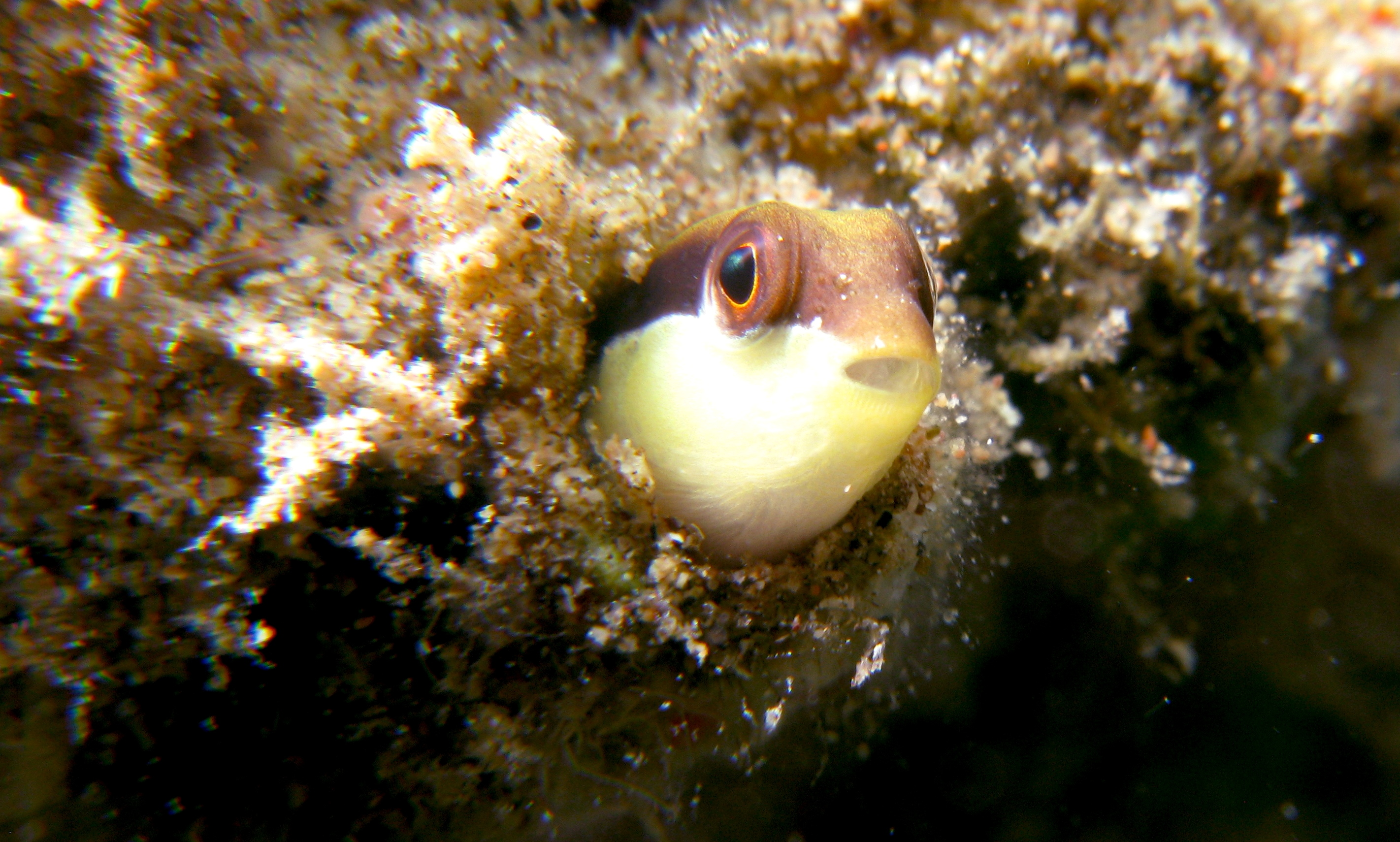

Conservation status
- Least Concern (IUCN 3.1)

Scientific classification
- Kingdom: Animalia
- Phylum: Chordata
- Class: Actinopterygii
- Order: Blenniiformes
- Family: Pseudochromidae
- Genus: Pseudochromis
- Species: P. sankeyi

Binomial name
- Pseudochromis sankeyi Lubbock, 1975

= Pseudochromis sankeyi =

Species of fish

Pseudochromis sankeyi, the striped dottyback, is a species of ray-finned fish from the Western Indian Ocean which is a member of the family Pseudochromidae. It occasionally makes its way into the aquarium trade. It grows to a size of 7 cm in length. The specific name honours the British collector and wholesaler of marine fish Richard D. Sankey, who gave Roger Lubbock study specimens.
