= Pseudochromis tauberae =

Conservation status
- Least Concern (IUCN 3.1)

Scientific classification
- Kingdom: Animalia
- Phylum: Chordata
- Class: Actinopterygii
- Order: Blenniiformes
- Family: Pseudochromidae
- Genus: Pseudochromis
- Species: P. tauberae

Binomial name
- Pseudochromis tauberae Lubbock, 1977

Species of fish

Pseudochromis tauberae, the lightheaded dottyback, is a species of ray-finned fish which is found from Madagascar and Kenya to Sodwana Bay in South Africa in the western Indian Ocean. which is a member of the family Pseudochromidae. This species reaches a length of 8 cm (3.1 in).
