= Pseudochromis kolythrus =

Conservation status
- Data Deficient (IUCN 3.1)

Scientific classification
- Kingdom: Animalia
- Phylum: Chordata
- Class: Actinopterygii
- Order: Blenniiformes
- Family: Pseudochromidae
- Genus: Pseudochromis
- Species: P. kolythrus

Binomial name
- Pseudochromis kolythrus A. C. Gill & R. Winterbottom, 1993

Species of fish

Pseudochromis kolythrus is a species of ray-finned fish in the family Pseudochromidae. It is found on Mbere reef, New Caledonia in the western Pacific Ocean.

== Description ==
This species reaches a standard length of 3.8 cm (1.5 in).
