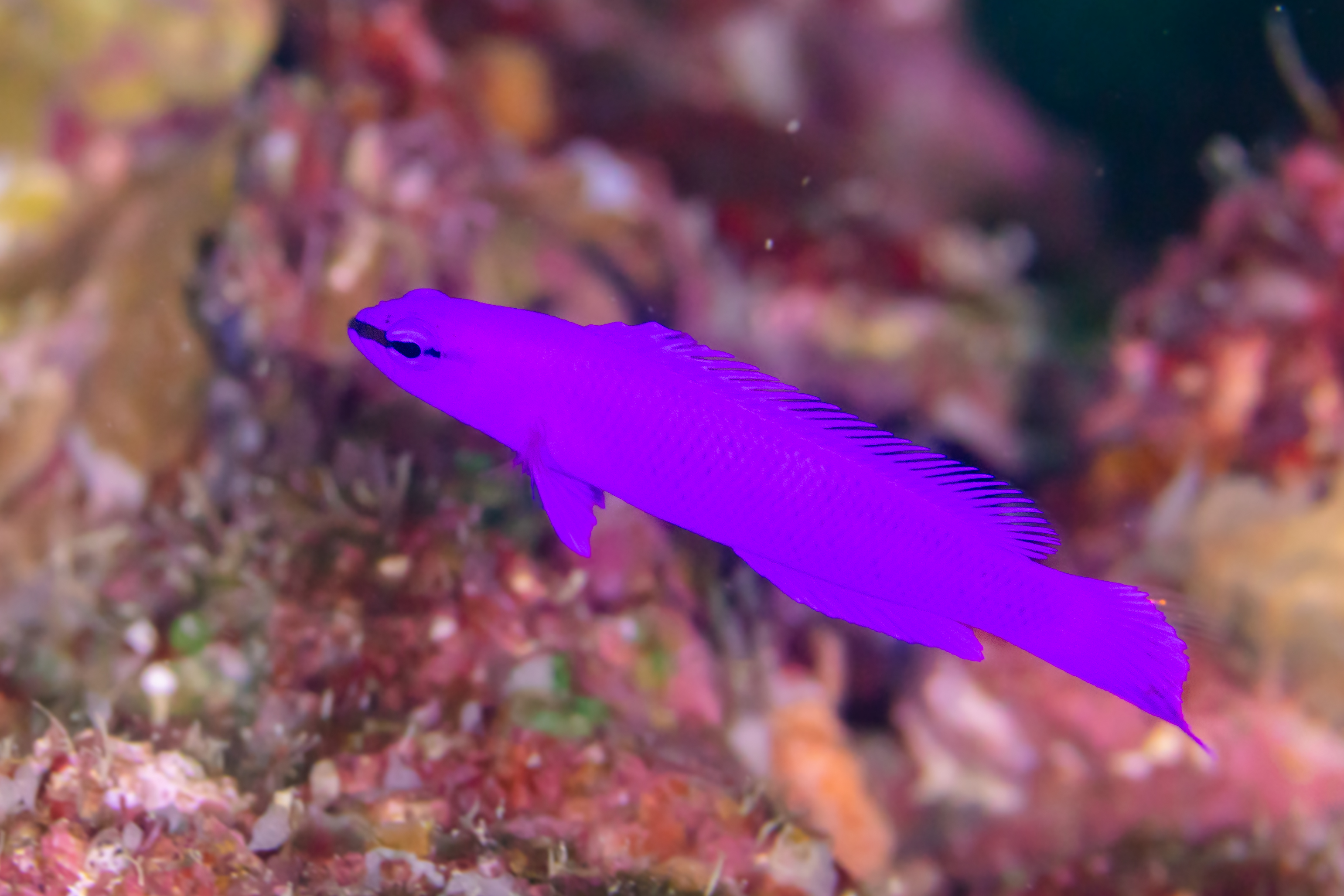
- Orchid Dottyback

Scientific classification
- Kingdom: Animalia
- Phylum: Chordata
- Class: Actinopterygii
- Order: Blenniiformes
- Family: Pseudochromidae
- Genus: Pseudochromis
- Species: P. fridmani

Binomial name
- Pseudochromis fridmani Klausewitz, 1968

= Pseudochromis fridmani =

Species of fish

Pseudochromis fridmani is a species of fish in the family Pseudochromidae, the dottybacks. Its common name is orchid dottyback. It is endemic to the Red Sea.

This fish is up to 6.3 centimeters long. It lives in tropical marine waters up to 60 meters deep near reefs. It shelters in holes and under overhangs.

This species has been bred in captivity and is of some commercial importance as an aquarium pet.

== Etymology ==
The specific name honours David Fridman of the Maritime Museum in Eilat in Israel who collected the type specimen.
