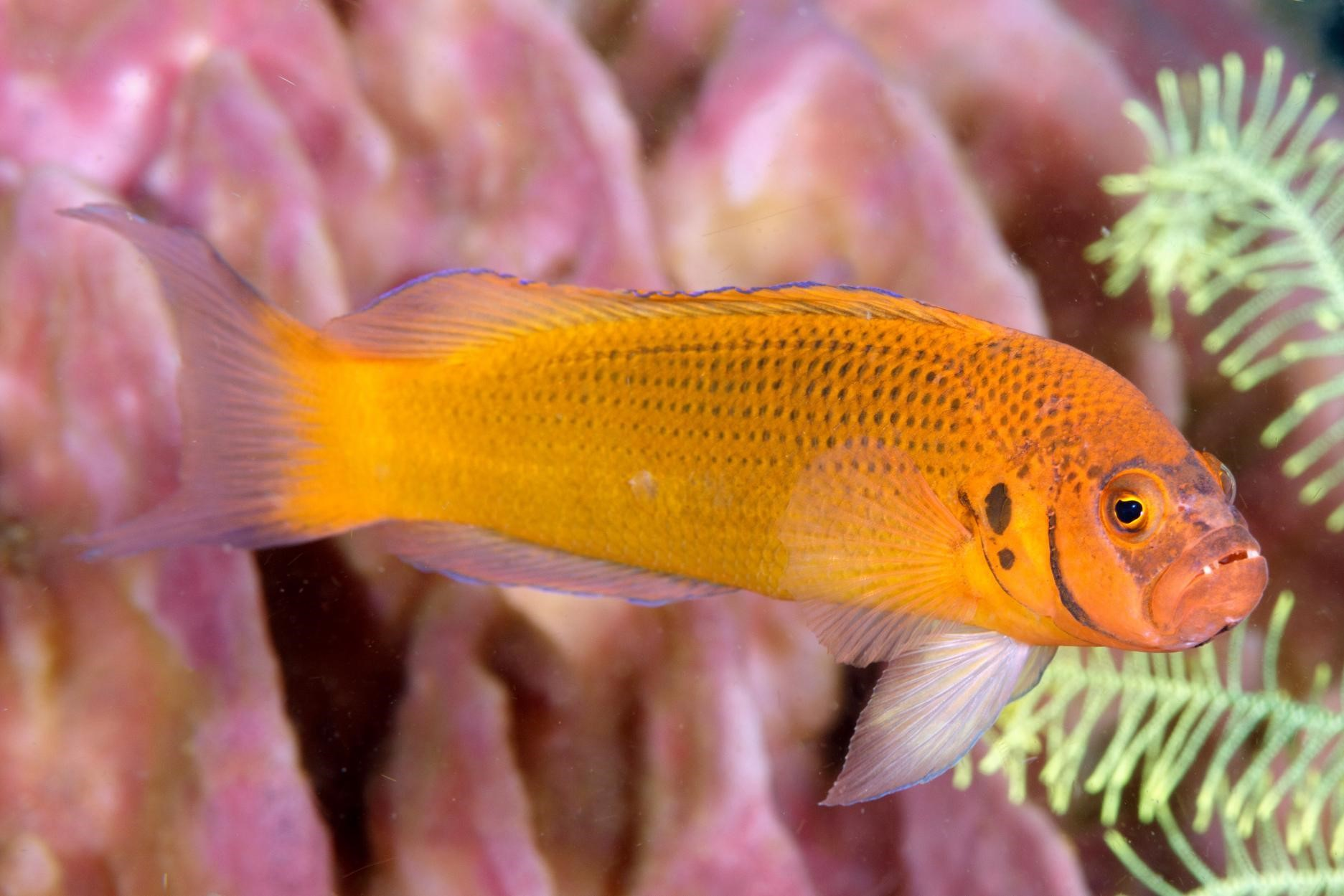

Conservation status
- Data Deficient (IUCN 3.1)

Scientific classification
- Kingdom: Animalia
- Phylum: Chordata
- Class: Actinopterygii
- Order: Blenniiformes
- Family: Pseudochromidae
- Genus: Pseudochromis
- Species: P. moorei

Binomial name
- Pseudochromis moorei Fowler, 1931

= Pseudochromis moorei =

Species of fish

Pseudochromis moorei, the jaguar dottyback, is a species of ray-finned fish in the family Pseudochromidae, It is found in the western-central Pacific Ocean.

== Description ==
This species reaches a standard length of 12 cm (4.7 in).

== Entymology ==
The fish is named in honor of John Percy Moore (1869-1965), of the University of Pennsylvania, who was assistant curator at the Academy of Natural Sciences of Philadelphia and a specialist in leeches and their biological control.
