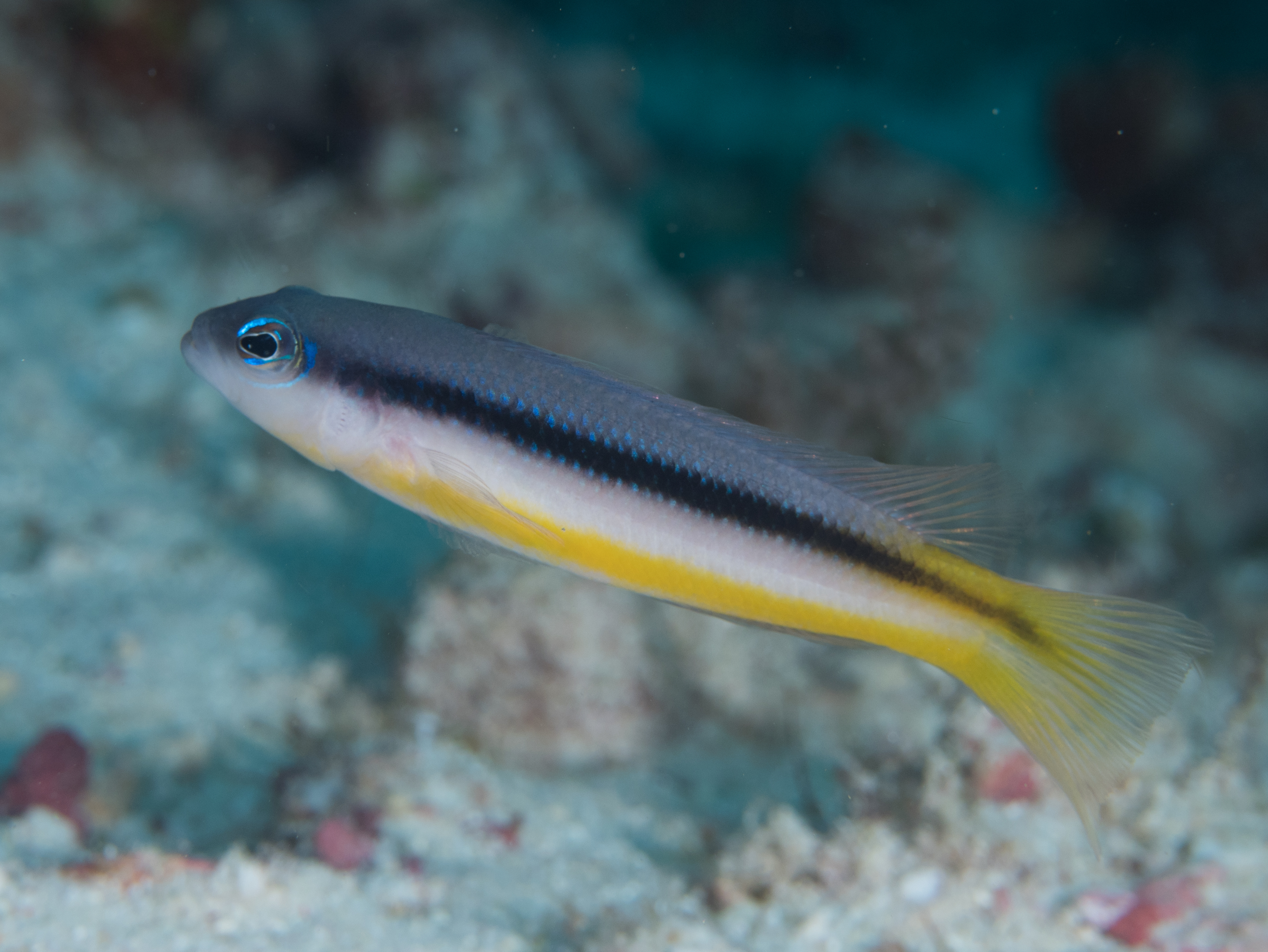
- In Raja Ampat

Scientific classification
- Kingdom: Animalia
- Phylum: Chordata
- Class: Actinopterygii
- Order: Blenniiformes
- Family: Pseudochromidae
- Genus: Pseudochromis
- Species: P. ammeri

Binomial name
- Pseudochromis ammeri A. C. Gill, G. R. Allen & Erdmann, 2012

= Pseudochromis ammeri =

Species of fish

Pseudochromis ammeri, the Raja Ampat dottyback, is a species of ray-finned fish in the family Pseudochromidae. It is found in the Pacific Ocean around Indonesia.

== Description ==
Pseudochromis ammeri reaches a standard length of 6.0 cm (2.4 in).
