= Pseudochromis flammicauda =

Scientific classification
- Kingdom: Animalia
- Phylum: Chordata
- Class: Actinopterygii
- Order: Blenniiformes
- Family: Pseudochromidae
- Genus: Pseudochromis
- Species: P. flammicauda

Binomial name
- Pseudochromis flammicauda Lubbock & Goldman, 1976

Species of fish

Pseudochromis flammicauda the orangetail dottyback orfire-tail dottyback, is a species of ray-finned fish from Australia which is a member of the family Pseudochromidae. It occasionally makes its way into the aquarium trade. This fish grows to a size of 5.5 cm in length.

== See also ==
- List of marine aquarium fish species
