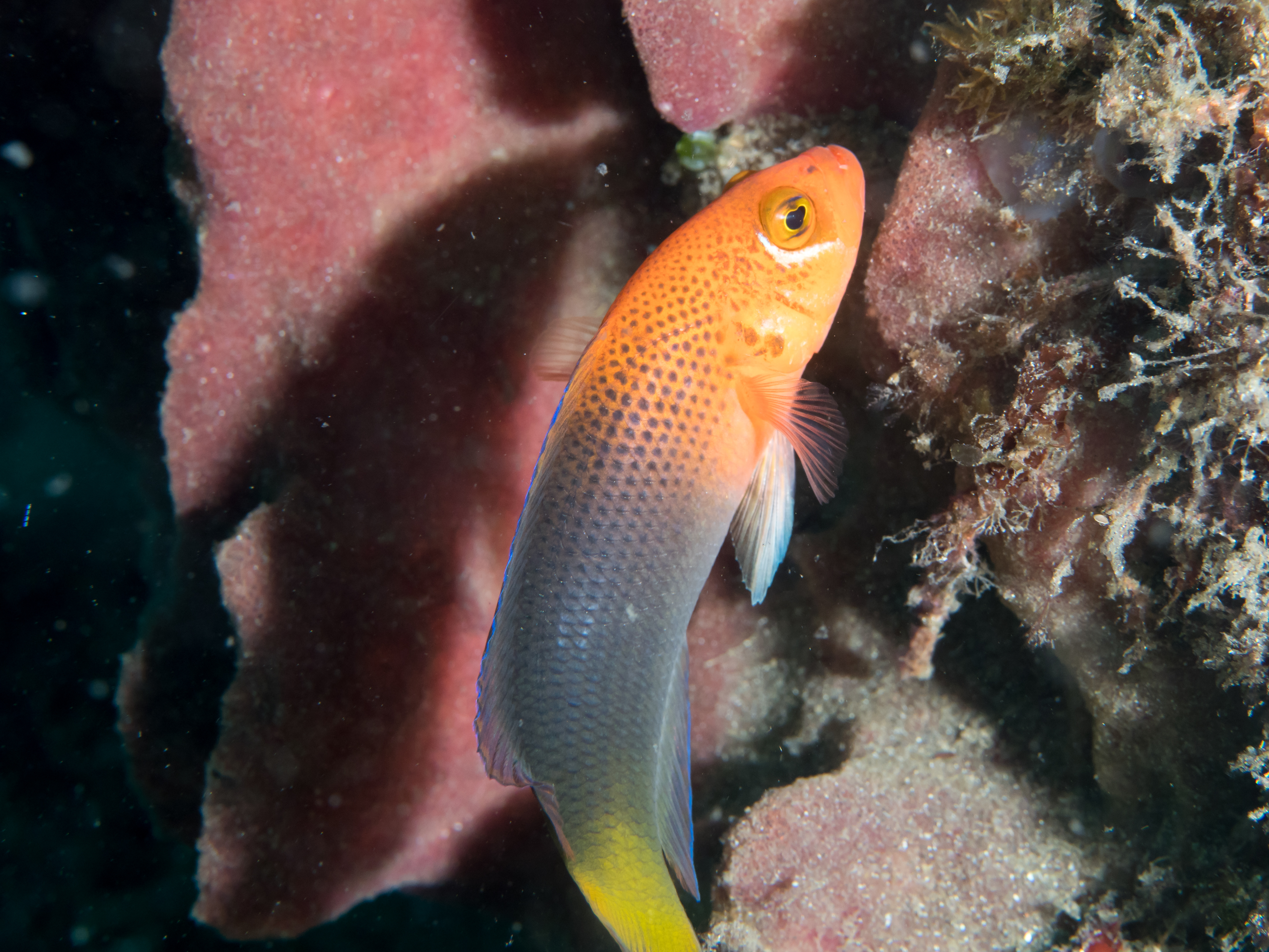

Scientific classification
- Kingdom: Animalia
- Phylum: Chordata
- Class: Actinopterygii
- Order: Blenniiformes
- Family: Pseudochromidae
- Genus: Pseudochromis
- Species: P. steenei

Binomial name
- Pseudochromis steenei A. C. Gill & Randall, 1992

= Pseudochromis steenei =

Species of fish

Pseudochromis steenei, also known as lyretail dottyback, is a saltwater fish from Indonesia that is occasionally kept in aquariums. The specific name honours the Australian naturalist and underwater photographer Roger C. Steene who assisted in the collection of the type specimen.

== Appearance ==
A small marine fish that reaches five inches in length. Males are grey with a bright orange head, while females are dark grey.

== In the aquarium ==
Pseudochromis steenei is a hardy member of a saltwater aquarium. As one of the few saltwater aquarium fish that can be bred in captivity use of tank bred individuals in aquariums is often encouraged to reduce the pressure on wild populations.

Twenty five gallons is typically quoted as the minimum tank size required to permanently house this fish. It is best to house them in a species tank, or aquariums greater than a hundred gallons however or they may bother other species persistently. Because it typically ignores invertebrates it is considered reef safe, although it will sometimes attack shrimp.

It is more aggressive than most, and perhaps all, dottybacks and will often attack other fish and even people. It can be particularly territorial with members of its own species meaning it is best to only keep one in an aquarium. Despite its hardy nature, it should not be placed in an aquarium with larger predatory fish such as lionfish, and grouper which may see it as a food source.
