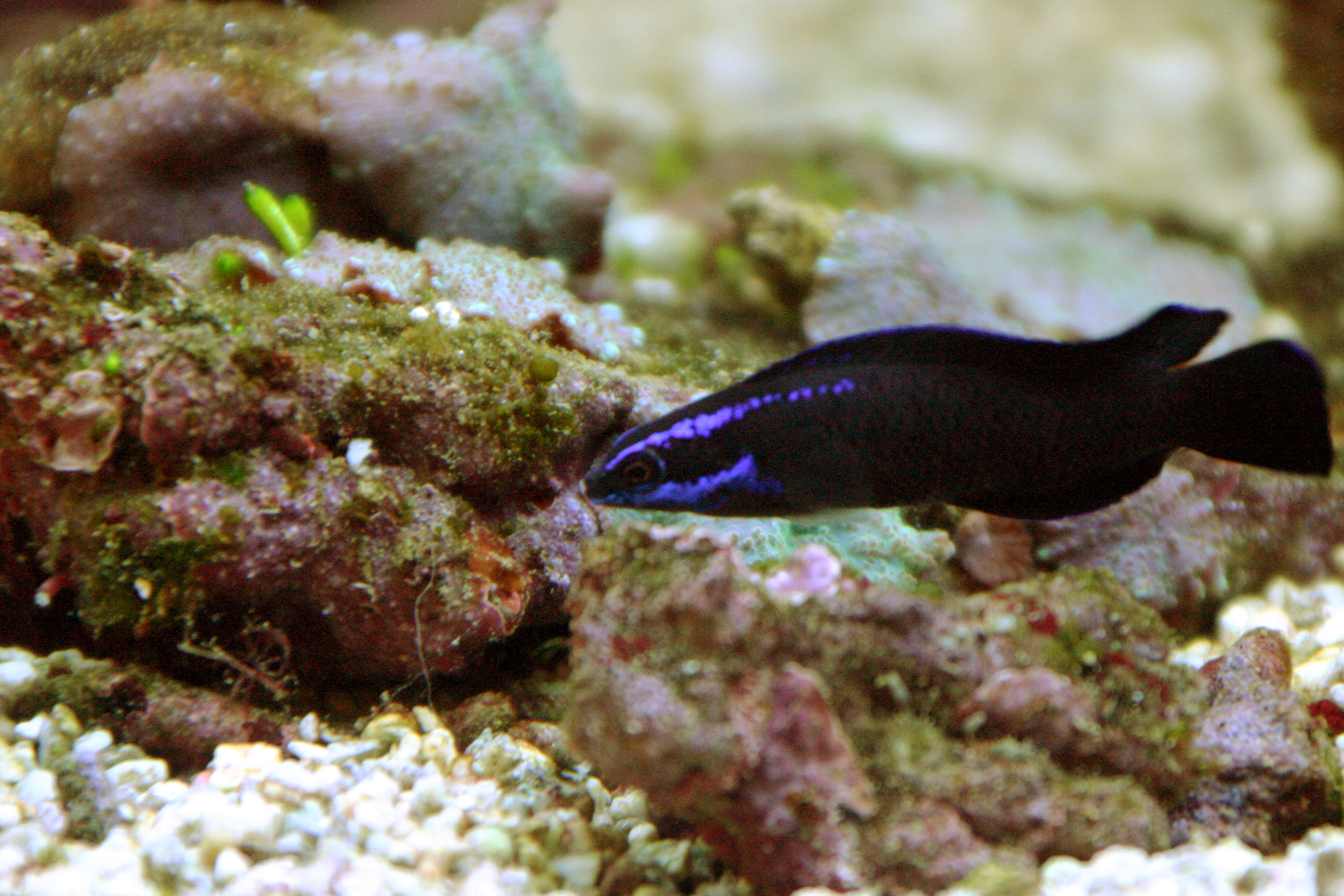

Scientific classification
- Kingdom: Animalia
- Phylum: Chordata
- Class: Actinopterygii
- Order: Blenniiformes
- Family: Pseudochromidae
- Genus: Pseudochromis
- Species: P. springeri

Binomial name
- Pseudochromis springeri Lubbock, 1975

= Pseudochromis springeri =

Species of fish

Pseudochromis springeri, also known as blue-striped dottyback, is a popular saltwater aquarium fish from the red sea and eastern Indian Ocean. The specific name honours the American ichthyologist Victor G. Springer of the Smithsonian Institution.

== Description ==
A small marine fish that reaches two inches in length. It is dark blue or black with blue stripes along its head and fins.

== In the Aquarium ==
Pseudochromis springeri is a hardy member of a saltwater aquarium as a saltwater fish that can be bred in captivity. Use of tank-bred individuals in aquariums is often encouraged to reduce the pressure on wild populations and increase captive survival rates. Twenty gallons is typically quoted as the minimum tank size required to permanently house this fish. It can be raised in as little as ten gallons with some risk of harassing other fish and invertebrates in its tank.

It is less aggressive than most dottybacks but will sometimes harass small, passive, fish and shrimp. It can be quite territorial meaning it is best to only keep one in an aquarium. If more than one is kept in an aquarium it is important that they are added at the same time. Despite its hardy nature, it also must not be placed in an aquarium with larger predatory fish such as lion fish and grouper which will often see it as a food source.
