= Pseudochromis dilectus =

Scientific classification
- Kingdom: Animalia
- Phylum: Chordata
- Class: Actinopterygii
- Division: Teleostei
- Order: Blenniiformes
- Family: Pseudochromidae
- Genus: Pseudochromis
- Species: P. dilectus

Binomial name
- Pseudochromis dilectus Lubbock, 1976

Species of fish

Pseudochromis dilectus is a species of ray-finned fish from the Western Indian Ocean which is classified in the family Pseudochromidae, the dottybacks. It occasionally makes its way into the aquarium trade.
