= Pseudochromis reticulatus =

Scientific classification
- Kingdom: Animalia
- Phylum: Chordata
- Class: Actinopterygii
- Order: Blenniiformes
- Family: Pseudochromidae
- Genus: Pseudochromis
- Species: P. reticulatus

Binomial name
- Pseudochromis reticulatus A. C. Gill & Woodland, 1992

Species of fish

Pseudochromis reticulatus, the reticulate dottyback, is a species of marine ray-finned fish, a dottyback belonging to the family Pseudochromidae. It is endemic to the waters off northwestern Australia.
