= Pseudochromis tigrinus =

Scientific classification
- Kingdom: Animalia
- Phylum: Chordata
- Class: Actinopterygii
- Order: Blenniiformes
- Family: Pseudochromidae
- Genus: Pseudochromis
- Species: P. tigrinus

Binomial name
- Pseudochromis tigrinus G. R. Allen & Erdmann, 2012

Species of fish

Pseudochromis tigrinus, the tiger dottyback, is a species of ray-finned fish in the family Pseudochromidae. It is found in the eastern Indian Ocean around the Andaman Islands.

== Description ==
Pseudochromis tigrinus reaches a standard length of 5.1 cm (2.0 in).
