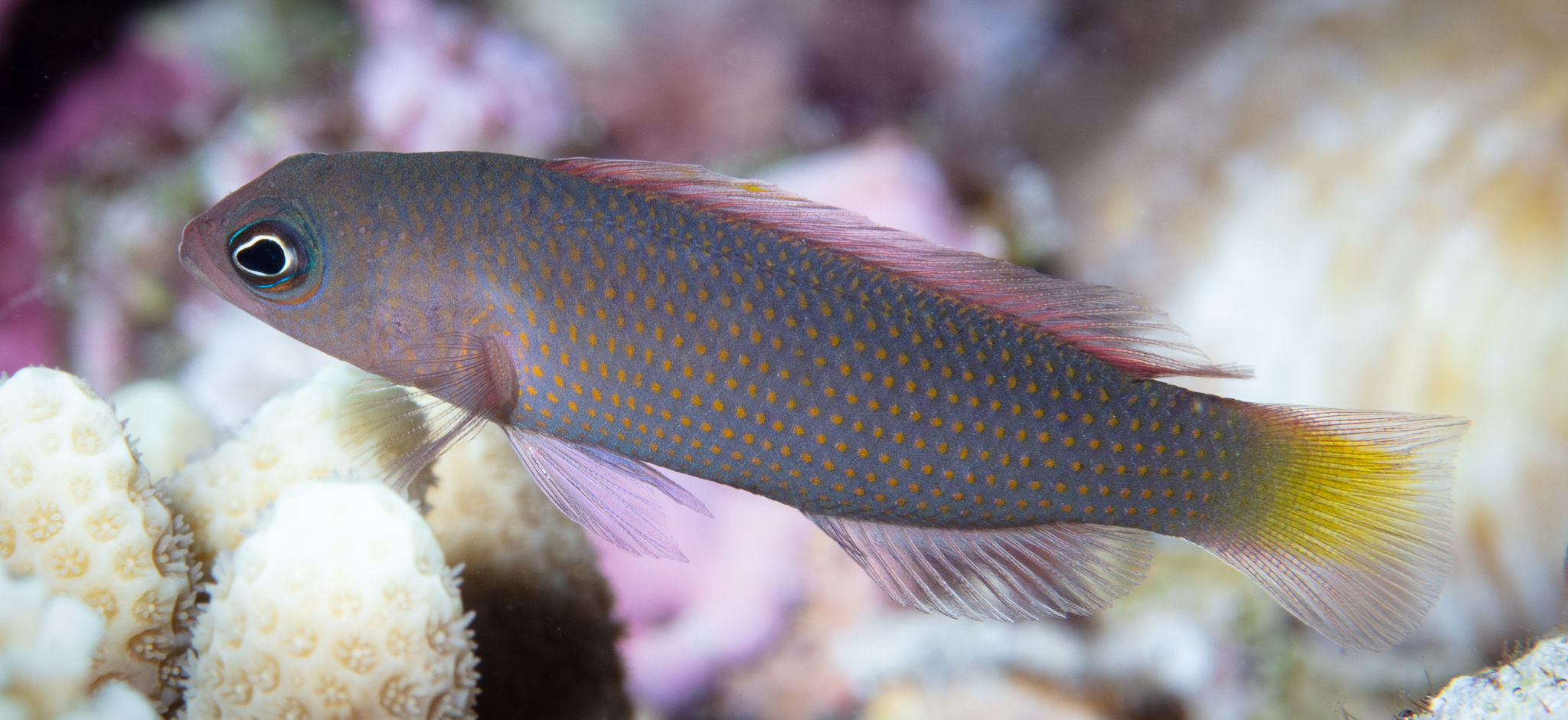
- Marshall Island Dottyback

Conservation status
- Least Concern (IUCN 3.1)

Scientific classification
- Kingdom: Animalia
- Phylum: Chordata
- Class: Actinopterygii
- Order: Blenniiformes
- Family: Pseudochromidae
- Genus: Pseudochromis
- Species: P. marshallensis

Binomial name
- Pseudochromis marshallensis L. P. Schultz, 1953

= Pseudochromis marshallensis =

Species of fish

Pseudochromis marshallensis, the Marshall Island dottyback, is a species of ray-finned fish in the family Pseudochromidae. It is found in the Pacific Ocean.

== Description ==
Pseudochromis marshallensis reaches a standard length of 8 cm (3.1 in).
