= Pseudochromis andamanensis =

Scientific classification
- Kingdom: Animalia
- Phylum: Chordata
- Class: Actinopterygii
- Order: Blenniiformes
- Family: Pseudochromidae
- Genus: Pseudochromis
- Species: P. andamanensis

Binomial name
- Pseudochromis andamanensis Lubbock, 1980

Species of fish

Pseudochromis andamanensis, the Andaman dottyback, is a species of ray-finned fish from Australia which is a member of the family Pseudochromidae. This species reaches a length of 7 cm (2.8 in).
