= Pale dottyback =

Conservation status
- Least Concern (IUCN 2.3)

Scientific classification
- Kingdom: Animalia
- Phylum: Chordata
- Class: Actinopterygii
- Order: Blenniiformes
- Family: Pseudochromidae
- Genus: Pseudochromis
- Species: P. pesi

Binomial name
- Pseudochromis pesi Lubbock, 1975

Species of fish

The pale dottyback (Pseudochromis pesi) is a species of fish in the family Pseudochromidae. It is found in, the Red Sea off Egypt, Jordan, and Saudi Arabia.
