= Pseudochromis howsoni =

Scientific classification
- Kingdom: Animalia
- Phylum: Chordata
- Class: Actinopterygii
- Order: Blenniiformes
- Family: Pseudochromidae
- Genus: Pseudochromis
- Species: P. howsoni

Binomial name
- Pseudochromis howsoni G. R. Allen, 1995

Species of fish

Pseudochromis howsoni, the Howson's dottyback, is a species of ray-finned fish in the family Pseudochromidae. It is found in the eastern Indian Ocean around Australia.

== Description ==
Pseudochromis howsoni reaches a standard length of 6.0 cm (2.4 in).

== Etymology ==
The fish is named in honor of Craig Howson, the captain of the charter vessel True North.
