= Pseudochromis kristinae =

Scientific classification
- Kingdom: Animalia
- Phylum: Chordata
- Class: Actinopterygii
- Division: Teleostei
- Order: Blenniiformes
- Family: Pseudochromidae
- Genus: Pseudochromis
- Species: P. kristinae

Binomial name
- Pseudochromis kristinae A.C. Gill, 2004

Species of fish

Pseudochromis kristinae, the lip-stick dottyback, is a species of ray-finned fish from the Western Indian Ocean: along East Africa, around the island of Madagascar and the Comoro Islands, which is a member of the family Pseudochromidae. This species reaches a length of 4.6 cm (1.8 in).

== Etymology ==
The fish is named in honor of Gill's wife Kristin.
