= Pseudochromis ransonneti =

Scientific classification
- Kingdom: Animalia
- Phylum: Chordata
- Class: Actinopterygii
- Division: Teleostei
- Order: Blenniiformes
- Family: Pseudochromidae
- Genus: Pseudochromis
- Species: P. ransonneti

Binomial name
- Pseudochromis ransonneti Steindachner, 1870

Species of fish

Pseudochromis ransonneti, the Karimunjawa dottyback, is a species of ray-finned fish in the family Pseudochromidae. It is found in the western Pacific Ocean.

== Description ==
This species reaches a standard length of 5.1 cm (2.0 in).

== Entymology ==
The fish is named for in honor of Eugen von Ransonnet-Villez (1838-1926), an Austrian diplomat, painter, lithographer, biologist and explorer, who sent a collection of fishes from Singapore, including the type specimen of this one.
