= Pseudochromis matahari =

Scientific classification
- Kingdom: Animalia
- Phylum: Chordata
- Class: Actinopterygii
- Order: Blenniiformes
- Family: Pseudochromidae
- Genus: Pseudochromis
- Species: P. matahari

Binomial name
- Pseudochromis matahari A. C. Gill, Erdmann & G. R. Allen, 2009

Species of fish

Pseudochromis matahari the sunburst dottyback, is a species of ray-finned fish in the family Pseudochromidae. It is found in Indonesia.

== Description ==
Pseudochromis matahari reaches a standard length of 4.5 cm (1.8 in).
