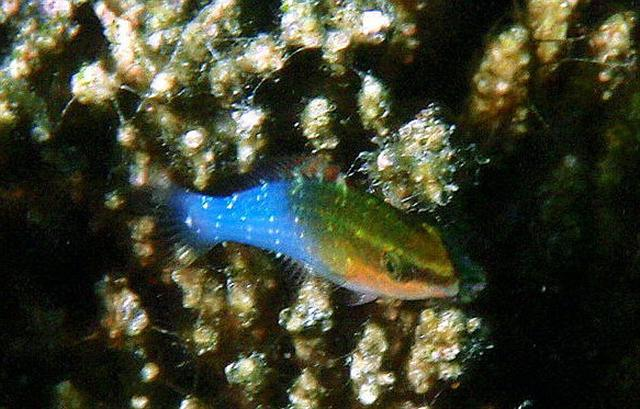

Scientific classification
- Kingdom: Animalia
- Phylum: Chordata
- Class: Actinopterygii
- Order: Blenniiformes
- Family: Pseudochromidae
- Genus: Pseudochromis
- Species: P. cyanotaenia

Binomial name
- Pseudochromis cyanotaenia Bleeker, 1857

= Pseudochromis cyanotaenia =

Species of fish

Pseudochromis cyanotaenia, the surge dottyback or blue-barred dottyback, is a species of ray-finned fish from the Western Pacific which is classified in the family Pseudochromidae. It occasionally makes its way into the aquarium trade. It grows to a length of 6 cm.
