= Pseudochromis coccinicauda =

Scientific classification
- Kingdom: Animalia
- Phylum: Chordata
- Class: Actinopterygii
- Order: Blenniiformes
- Family: Pseudochromidae
- Genus: Pseudochromis
- Species: P. coccinicauda

Binomial name
- Pseudochromis coccinicauda (Tickell, 1888)

Synonyms
- Malacocanthus coccinicauda Tickell, 1888

Species of fish

Pseudochromis coccinicauda, the yellow-breasted dottyback, is a species of ray-finned fish, in the family Pseudochromidae, the dottybacks. It is found in the Western Indian Ocean, in the seas around the Maldives, the Andaman Islands and Indonesia. It occasionally makes its way into the aquarium trade. It grows to a size of 3.9 cm (1.5 in) in length.

== See also ==
- List of marine aquarium fish species
