= Pseudochromis luteus =

Conservation status
- Least Concern (IUCN 3.1)

Scientific classification
- Kingdom: Animalia
- Phylum: Chordata
- Class: Actinopterygii
- Order: Blenniiformes
- Family: Pseudochromidae
- Genus: Pseudochromis
- Species: P. luteus

Binomial name
- Pseudochromis luteus Aoyagi, 1943

Species of fish

Pseudochromis luteus is a species of ray-finned fish in the family Pseudochromidae. It is found in the western Pacific Ocean.

== Description ==
This species reaches a length of 4.7 cm (1.9 in).
