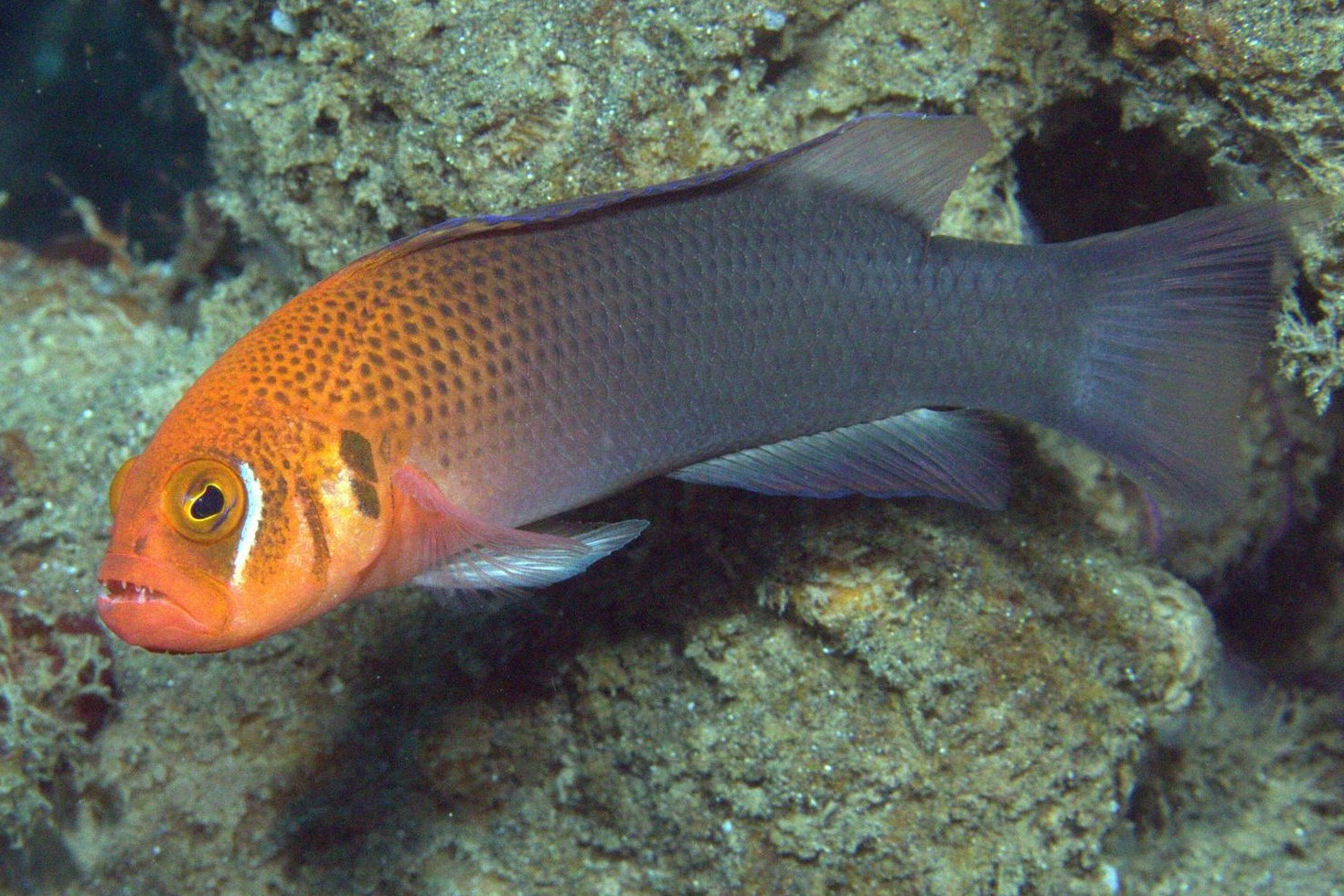

Scientific classification
- Kingdom: Animalia
- Phylum: Chordata
- Class: Actinopterygii
- Order: Blenniiformes
- Family: Pseudochromidae
- Genus: Pseudochromis
- Species: P. erdmanni

Binomial name
- Pseudochromis erdmanni A. C. Gill & G. R. Allen, 2011

= Pseudochromis erdmanni =

Species of fish

Pseudochromis erdmanni, also known as Erdmann's dottyback, is a species of ray-finned fish in the family Pseudochromidae. It is found in the Pacific Ocean around Indonesia.

== Description ==
Pseudochromis erdmanni reaches a standard length of 8.1 cm (3.2 in).

== Etymology ==
The fish is named for Mark Erdmann of Conservation International, Indonesia, who collected the type specimens.
