= Pseudochromis oligochrysus =

Scientific classification
- Kingdom: Animalia
- Phylum: Chordata
- Class: Actinopterygii
- Order: Blenniiformes
- Family: Pseudochromidae
- Genus: Pseudochromis
- Species: P. oligochrysus

Binomial name
- Pseudochromis oligochrysus A. C. Gill, G. R. Allen & Erdmann, 2012

Species of fish

Pseudochromis oligochrysus, the gold-ring dottyback, is a species of ray-finned fish in the family Pseudochromidae. It is found in the Pacific Ocean around Indonesia,

== Description ==
Pseudochromis oligochrysus reaches a standard length of 5.0 cm (2.0 in).
