= Pseudochromis fuligifinis =

Conservation status
- Least Concern (IUCN 3.1)

Scientific classification
- Kingdom: Animalia
- Phylum: Chordata
- Class: Actinopterygii
- Order: Blenniiformes
- Family: Pseudochromidae
- Genus: Pseudochromis
- Species: P. fuligifinis

Binomial name
- Pseudochromis fuligifinis A. C. Gill & J. T. Williams, 2011

Species of fish

Pseudochromis fuligifinis, the soot-tail dottyback, is a species of ray-finned fish in the family Pseudochromidae. It is found in the Philippines.

== Description ==
This species reaches a standard length of 3.2 cm (1.3 in).
