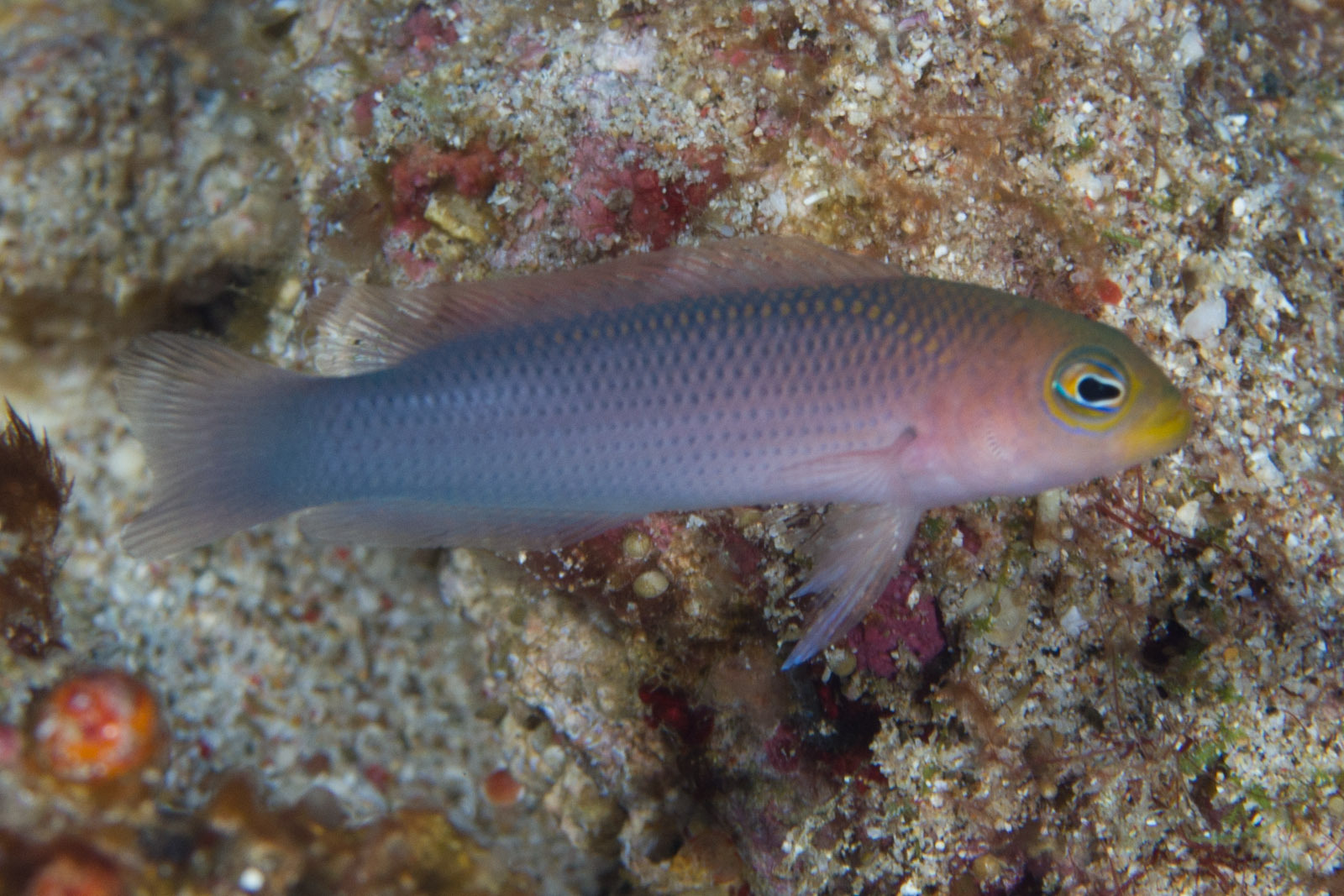

Scientific classification
- Kingdom: Animalia
- Phylum: Chordata
- Class: Actinopterygii
- Order: Blenniiformes
- Family: Pseudochromidae
- Genus: Pseudochromis
- Species: P. aurulentus

Binomial name
- Pseudochromis aurulentus A. C. Gill & J. E. Randall, 1998

= Pseudochromis aurulentus =

Species of fish

Pseudochromis aurulentus, the yellowlip dottyback, is a species of ray-finned fish in the family Pseudochromidae. It is found in the western-central Pacific Ocean.

== Description ==
Pseudochromis aurulentus reaches a standard length of 6.8 cm (2.7 in).
