= Pseudochromis magnificus =

Scientific classification
- Kingdom: Animalia
- Phylum: Chordata
- Class: Actinopterygii
- Order: Blenniiformes
- Family: Pseudochromidae
- Genus: Pseudochromis
- Species: P. magnificus

Binomial name
- Pseudochromis magnificus Lubbock, 1977

Species of fish

Pseudochromis magnificus, the magnificent dottyback, is a species of ray-finned fish found in the Cargados Carajos in the Western Indian Ocean which is a member of the family Pseudochromidae.
