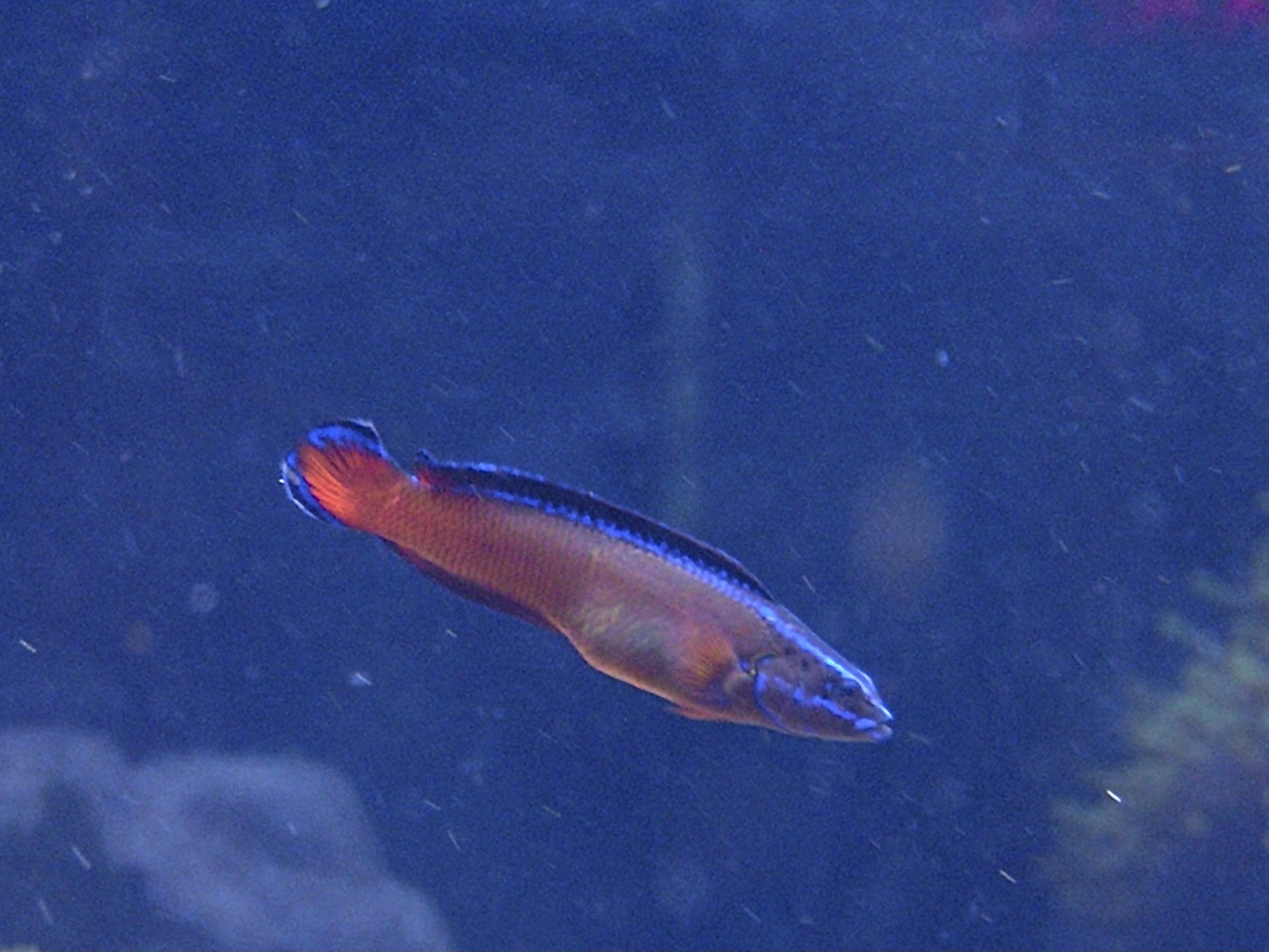

Scientific classification
- Kingdom: Animalia
- Phylum: Chordata
- Class: Actinopterygii
- Order: Blenniiformes
- Family: Pseudochromidae
- Genus: Pseudochromis
- Species: P. dutoiti

Binomial name
- Pseudochromis dutoiti J. L. B. Smith, 1955

= Pseudochromis dutoiti =

Species of fish

Pseudochromis dutoiti is a species of ray-finned fish from the Western Indian Ocean: In the north from Pakistan, south to Durban, South Africa which is a member of the family Pseudochromidae. This species reaches a length of 9.0 cm (3.5 in).
