= Pseudochromis madagascariensis =

Scientific classification
- Kingdom: Animalia
- Phylum: Chordata
- Class: Actinopterygii
- Order: Blenniiformes
- Family: Pseudochromidae
- Genus: Pseudochromis
- Species: P. madagascariensis

Binomial name
- Pseudochromis madagascariensis A. C. Gill, 2004

Species of fish

Pseudochromis madagascariensis, the Madagascan dottyback, is a species of ray-finned fish in the family Pseudochromidae from Madagascar. It grows to a length of 5.2 cm (2.0 in).
