= Anisochromis =

Scientific classification
- Kingdom: Animalia
- Phylum: Chordata
- Class: Actinopterygii
- Order: Blenniiformes
- Family: Pseudochromidae
- Subfamily: Anisochrominae; J. L. B. Smith, 1954
- Genus: Anisochromis; J. L. B. Smith, 1954

Type species
- Anisochromis kenyae J. L. B. Smith, 1954

Genus of fishes

Anisochromis is a genus of ray-finned fish, it is the only genus in the monotypic subfamily Anisochrominae, part of the dottyback family Pseudochromidae. They are distinguished from other subfamilies of the Pseudochromidae by having a single spine and four soft rays, three of which are branched and one is simple, in the pelvic fins and the pelvic fins are obviously placed to the front of the base of the pectoral fin. The pectoral fins have 13-15 rays and there is a single lateral line which runs along the base of the dorsal fin, the dorsal fin having one weak spine.

== Species ==
There are three species in the genus Anisochromis:

- Anisochromis kenyae J. L. B. Smith, 1954 (Annie)
- Anisochromis mascarenensis A. C. Gill & Fricke, 2001
- Anisochromis straussi Springer, C.L. Smith & Fraser, 1977
