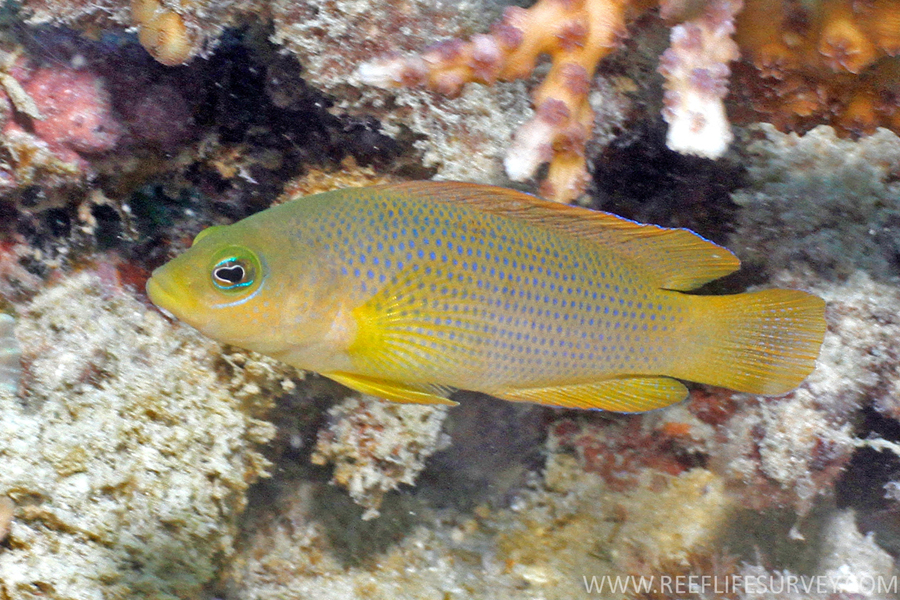

Scientific classification
- Kingdom: Animalia
- Phylum: Chordata
- Class: Actinopterygii
- Division: Teleostei
- Order: Blenniiformes
- Family: Pseudochromidae
- Genus: Pseudochromis
- Species: P. fuscus

Binomial name
- Pseudochromis fuscus Müller & Troschel, 1849

= Pseudochromis fuscus =

Species of fish

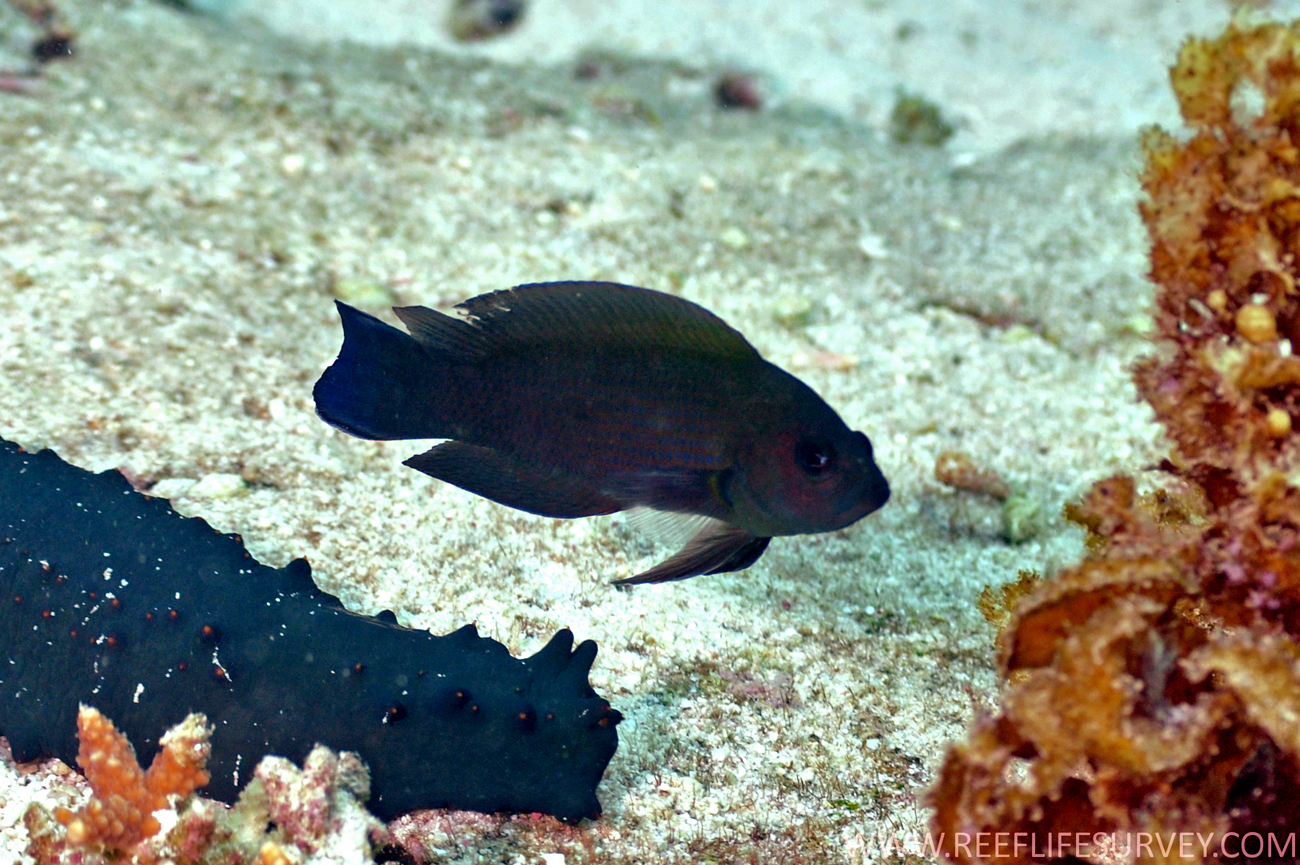
A dusky dottyback, Pseudochromis fuscus, at Ningaloo Reef, Western Australia.

Pseudochromis fuscus is a species of saltwater fish in the dottyback family. Dottybacks are generally very bright in color and relatively small, factors which have made them popular among aquarium enthusiasts. Besides their coloration and size, they are probably best known for their aggressive temperament. While many of the more common dottybacks are in the Pseudochromis genus, there are also species in other genera. Common names for this particular species include the brown dottyback, the golden dottyback, and the musky dottyback. The common name “Golden dottyback” is shared with another species of dottyback, the Pseudochromis pseudoplesiopinae. The species name, fuscus, means dark or dusky in Latin.

== Description ==
Brown dottybacks grow to a maximum length of about 10 centimeters and they have three dorsal spines, several dorsal soft rays, three anal spines and a few anal soft rays. The spine count is what distinguishes them from their close neighbor, the true basses from the family Serranidae. Like most dottybacks, they are very long and slender. They are also the largest species within the genus Pseudochromis. Brown dottybacks have pear-shaped eyes, not unlike bass, and canine teeth. Color usually ranges from bright yellow to dark brown, but orange, pink, and gray fish of this species have been found as well. Blue spots can often be seen on the nape and the anterior part of the body. Studies have shown that the color differences in wild brown dottybacks are not due to genetic changes. In fact, individuals seem to be able to change their color, though the factors causing color changes are undetermined. The shade of yellow or brown that a dottyback displays seems to correlate with the shade of prey that a dottyback targets. For example, brown dottybacks with a bright yellow coloration are more likely to be found near prey with a bright yellow coloration. Brighter brown dottybacks are also more likely to be found in deeper areas, while their browner cousins are more likely to be found in shallower areas.

== Taxonomy ==
Pseudochromis fuscus is a member of the family Pseudochromidae, which includes other dottybacks like the purple dottyback (Pseudochromis porphyreus) and the bluelined dottyback (Pseudochromis cyanotaenia). Pseudochromidae are members of the suborder Percoidei, which falls under the order Perciformes. This is a very large order that includes many of the bony fish in the ocean. In fact, Perciformes is the largest order of vertebrates, with over 10,000 species. Perciformes is in the class Actinopterygii, which, is in the superclass Pisces. Pisces is in the phylum Chordata, which is in the kingdom Animalia.

== Distribution ==
Pseudochromis fuscus is native to the south-western Pacific Ocean and the eastern Indian Ocean. Its range is from Sri Lanka east to Vanuatu and from Australia north to Hong Kong. A map showing the distribution of this fish can be seen here, with red spots showing the range of this dottyback. As is shown on the map, the southern limit of the distribution stops at about the southern limit of the reefs off the eastern coast of Australia. This is because the brown dottyback is most often found in coral reef habitats.

== Habitat ==
Pseudochromis fuscus is a very common fish on coral reefs. It can make up as much as 10% of the piscivorous fishes in the community, with competing predators consisting of fish like the moon wrasse or lizardfish. The brown dottyback is often found in crevices or ledges. It is also often found swimming near branching corals.

== Diet ==
Pseudochromis fuscus is a carnivorous fish that often feeds on juvenile coral reef fish or crustaceans, though they also will feed on mollusks. Typically, juvenile fish are only targeted for predation during the summer, as the survivors outgrow their vulnerability to dottyback predation by the winter. Common predatory targets include many species of damselfish. Unlike other species of competing piscivors, predation of juvenile fish by the brown dottyback is not affected by the presence of adult males guarding the juveniles. Sometimes, adult male damselfish will guard the nests of their young. While this reduces predation on the young by other predators, predation by dottyback appears to be unaffected. Because of this predatory behavior, the brown dottyback is considered an important regulator of the composition of the coral reef community.

== Behavior ==
The brown dottyback is a very aggressive predatory fish, and therefore, most of the behavioral research conducted on it relates to the predatory relationship that this fish has with others in the coral reef community. Brown dottybacks appear to preferentially prey on fish with longer bodies, an observation which is consistent with the optimal foraging theory. While long body types were preferred in prey, various studies have conflicting results when examining the effects of overall prey size on targeting. Some studies have found that brown dottybacks prefer larger prey, while others have found that smaller prey are preferred. Brown dottybacks also appear to target rare fish for predation more often than common fish. Preference is also given to targeting prey in good condition over prey in bad condition, a distinction that is often made through chemical cues. In fact, it appears as though chemical signals are the primary means by which a foraging response is stimulated. Predatory behavior also increases for brown dottybacks in a bleached coral reef environment, as the lack of coloration of the coral makes it easier for the predators to detect their prey.

== Aquaria ==
Pseudochromis fuscus, along with many other species in the dottyback family, are often kept as aquarium fish. These fish are as aggressive in captivity as they are in the wild, so brown dottybacks are often kept with fish that will not disturb their territory or they are kept completely separate from other fish. For this reason, it is very important to have only one brown dottyback in a tank. Because this fish is so large relative to other dottybacks, the brown dottyback is even more of a bully than the other aggressive species within the genus Pseudochromis. Still, they are a relatively easy fish to keep in captivity, and they can be kept with larger fish like adult damselfish or parrotfish. It is best to feed brown dottybacks with finely chopped meaty foods, like krill or squid, but this fish will also adapt to eating flakes, pellets, and herbivorous foods. Special attention must be given to the choice of foods, because the brown dottyback's diet will affect its coloration. This is why a diet high in vitamins is recommended, as this diet should maintain a rich golden color. Another important consideration for a tank containing a brown dottyback is the need for rocky ledges, crevices, and caves.
