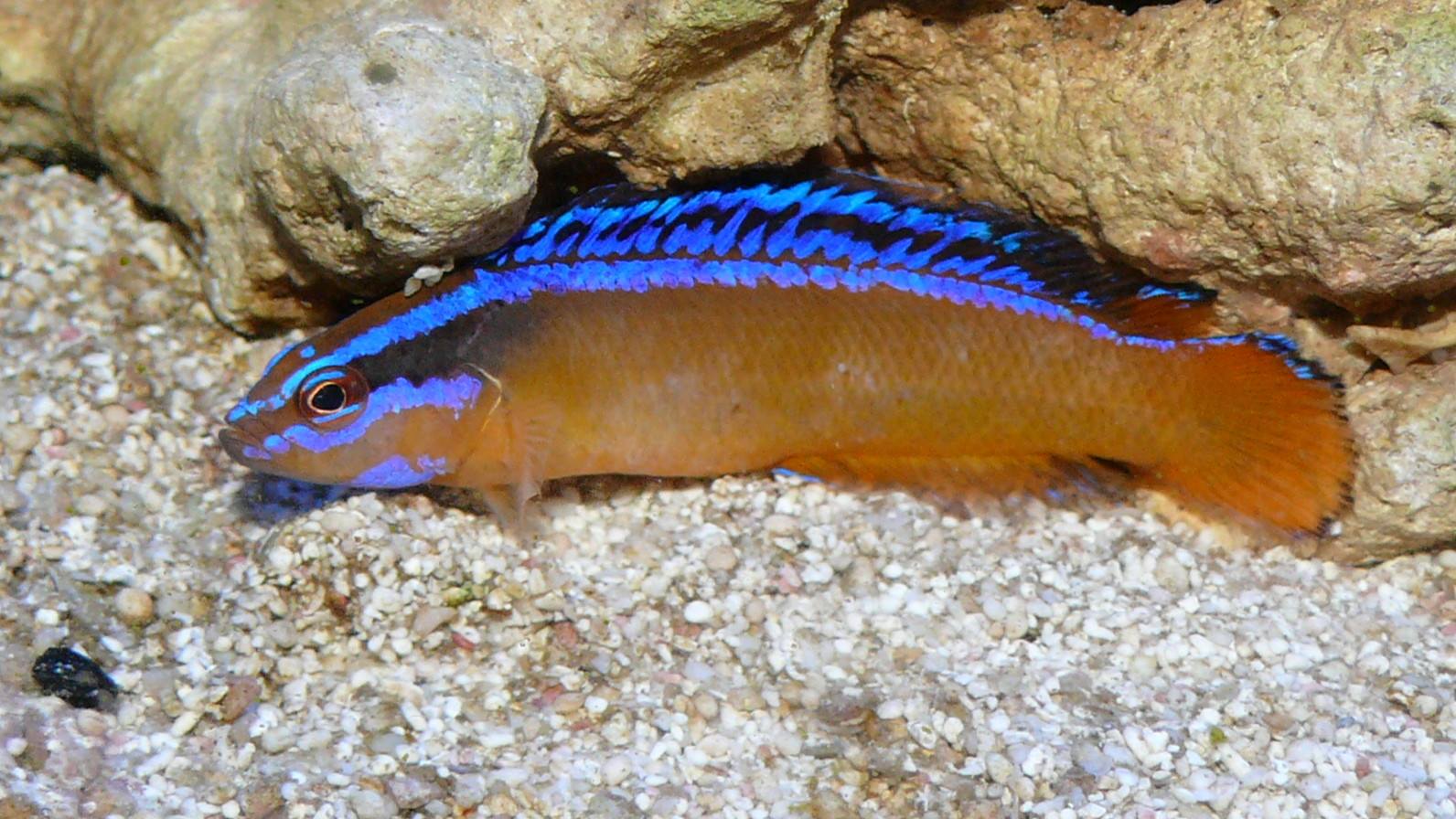
- Pseudochromis aldabraensis

Scientific classification
- Kingdom: Animalia
- Phylum: Chordata
- Class: Actinopterygii
- Division: Teleostei
- Order: Blenniiformes
- Family: Pseudochromidae
- Subfamily: Pseudochrominae
- Genus: Pseudochromis; Rüppell, 1835

Type species
- Pseudochromis olivaceus Rüppell, 1835

Synonyms
- Bartschina Fowler, 1931; Devisina Fowler, 1931; Labristoma Swainson, 1839; Leptochromis Bleeker, 1875; Onar De Vis, 1885

= Pseudochromis =

Genus of fishes

Pseudochromis is a genus of fish in the family Pseudochromidae found in Indian and Pacific Ocean.

== Species ==
There are currently 71 recognized species in this genus:

- Pseudochromis aldabraensis Bauchot-Boutin, 1958 (Orange dottyback)
- Pseudochromis alticaudex A. C. Gill, 2004 (Spot-breast dottyback)
- Pseudochromis ammeri A. C. Gill, G. R. Allen & Erdmann, 2012 (Raja Ampat dottyback)
- Pseudochromis andamanensis Lubbock, 1980 (Andaman dottyback)
- Pseudochromis aureolineatus A. C. Gill, 2004 (Gold-lined dottyback)
- Pseudochromis aurulentus A. C. Gill & J. E. Randall, 1998 (Yellow-lip dottyback)
- Pseudochromis bitaeniatus (Fowler, 1931) (Double-striped dottyback)
- Pseudochromis caudalis Boulenger, 1898 (Stripe-tailed dottyback)
- Pseudochromis chrysospilus A. C. Gill & Zajonz, 2011 (Gold-spotted dottyback)
- Pseudochromis coccinicauda (Tickell, 1888) (Yellow-breasted dottyback)
- Pseudochromis colei Herre, 1933 (False bandit dottyback)
- Pseudochromis cometes A. C. Gill & J. E. Randall, 1998 (Commet dottyback)
- Pseudochromis cyanotaenia Bleeker, 1857 (Surge dottyback)
- Pseudochromis dilectus Lubbock, 1976
- Pseudochromis dixurus Lubbock, 1975 (Fork-tail dottyback)
- Pseudochromis dutoiti J. L. B. Smith, 1955 (Dutoit's dottyback)
- Pseudochromis eichleri A. C. Gill, G. R. Allen & Erdmann, 2012 (Eichler's dottyback)
- Pseudochromis elongatus Lubbock, 1980 (Elongate dottyback)
- Pseudochromis erdmanni A. C. Gill & G. R. Allen, 2011 (Erdmann's dottyback)
- Pseudochromis flammicauda Lubbock & Goldman, 1976 (Fire-tail dottyback)
- Pseudochromis flavivertex Rüppell, 1835 (Sunrise dottyback)
- Pseudochromis flavopunctatus A. C. Gill & J. E. Randall, 1998 (Yellow-spotted dottyback)
- Pseudochromis fowleri Herre, 1934 (Philippines dottyback)
- Pseudochromis fridmani Klausewitz, 1968 (Orchid dottyback)
- Pseudochromis fuligifinis A. C. Gill & J. T. Williams, 2011 (Soot-tail dottyback)
- Pseudochromis fuscus J. P. Müller & Troschel, 1849 (Brown dottyback)
- Pseudochromis howsoni G. R. Allen, 1995 (Howson's dottyback)
- Pseudochromis jace G. R. Allen, A. C. Gill & Erdmann, 2008 (Zippered dottyback)
- Pseudochromis jamesi L. P. Schultz, 1943 (Spot-tailed dottyback)
- Pseudochromis kolythrus A. C. Gill & R. Winterbottom, 1993
- Pseudochromis kristinae A. C. Gill, 2004 (Lip-stick dottyback)
- Pseudochromis leucorhynchus Lubbock, 1977 (White-nosed dottyback)
- Pseudochromis linda J. E. Randall & Stanaland, 1989 (Yellow-tail dottyback)
- Pseudochromis litus A. C. Gill & J. E. Randall, 1998 (Plain dottyback)
- Pseudochromis lugubris A. C. Gill & G. R. Allen, 2004 (Mournful dottyback)
- Pseudochromis luteus Aoyagi, 1943
- Pseudochromis madagascariensis A. C. Gill, 2004 (Madagascan dottyback)
- Pseudochromis magnificus Lubbock, 1977 (Magnificent dottyback)
- Pseudochromis marshallensis L. P. Schultz, 1953 (Marshall Islands dottyback)
- Pseudochromis matahari A. C. Gill, Erdmann & G. R. Allen, 2009 (Sun-burst dottyback)
- Pseudochromis melanurus A. C. Gill, 2004 (Black-tail dottyback)
- Pseudochromis melas Lubbock, 1977 (Dark dottyback)
- Pseudochromis mooii A. C. Gill, 2004 (Mooi's dottyback)
- Pseudochromis moorei Fowler, 1931 (Jaguar dottyback)
- Pseudochromis natalensis Regan, 1916 (Natal dottyback)
- Pseudochromis nigrovittatus Boulenger, 1897 (Black-stripe dottyback)
- Pseudochromis oligochrysus A. C. Gill, G. R. Allen & Erdmann, 2012 (Gold-ring dottyback)
- Pseudochromis olivaceus Rüppell, 1835 (Olive dottyback)
- Pseudochromis omanensis A. C. Gill & Mee, 1993
- Pseudochromis persicus J. A. Murray, 1887 (Blue-spotted dottyback)
- Pseudochromis perspicillatus Günther, 1862 (Southeast Asian black-stripe dottyback)
- Pseudochromis pesi Lubbock, 1975 (Pale dottyback)
- Pseudochromis pictus A. C. Gill & J. E. Randall, 1998 (Painted dottyback)
- Pseudochromis punctatus Kotthaus, 1970 (Black-back dottyback)
- Pseudochromis pylei J. E. Randall & McCosker, 1989 (Pyle's dottyback)
- Pseudochromis quinquedentatus McCulloch, 1926 (Spiny dottyback)
- Pseudochromis ransonneti Steindachner, 1870 (Karimunjawa dottyback)
- Pseudochromis reticulatus A. C. Gill & Woodland, 1992 (Reticulate dottyback)
- Pseudochromis rutilus A. C. Gill, G. R. Allen & Erdmann, 2012 (Red-gold dottyback)
- Pseudochromis sankeyi Lubbock, 1975 (Striped dottyback)
- Pseudochromis socotraensis A. C. Gill & Zajonz, 2011 (Socotra dottyback)
- Pseudochromis springeri Lubbock, 1975 (Blue-striped dottyback)
- Pseudochromis steenei A. C. Gill & J. E. Randall, 1992 (Lyre-tail dottyback)
- Pseudochromis striatus A. C. Gill, K. T. Shao & J. P. Chen, 1995 (Striated dottyback)
- Pseudochromis tapeinosoma Bleeker, 1853 (Black-margin dottyback)
- Pseudochromis tauberae Lubbock, 1977 (Light-headed dottyback)
- Pseudochromis tigrinus G. R. Allen & Erdmann, 2012 (Tiger dottyback)
- Pseudochromis tonozukai A. C. Gill & G. R. Allen, 2004 (Spot-stripe dottyback)
- Pseudochromis viridis A. C. Gill & G. R. Allen, 1996 (Green dottyback)
- Pseudochromis wilsoni (Whitley, 1929) (Yellow-fin dottyback)
- Pseudochromis yamasakii A. C. Gill & Senou, 2016 (Dotty-belly dottyback)
