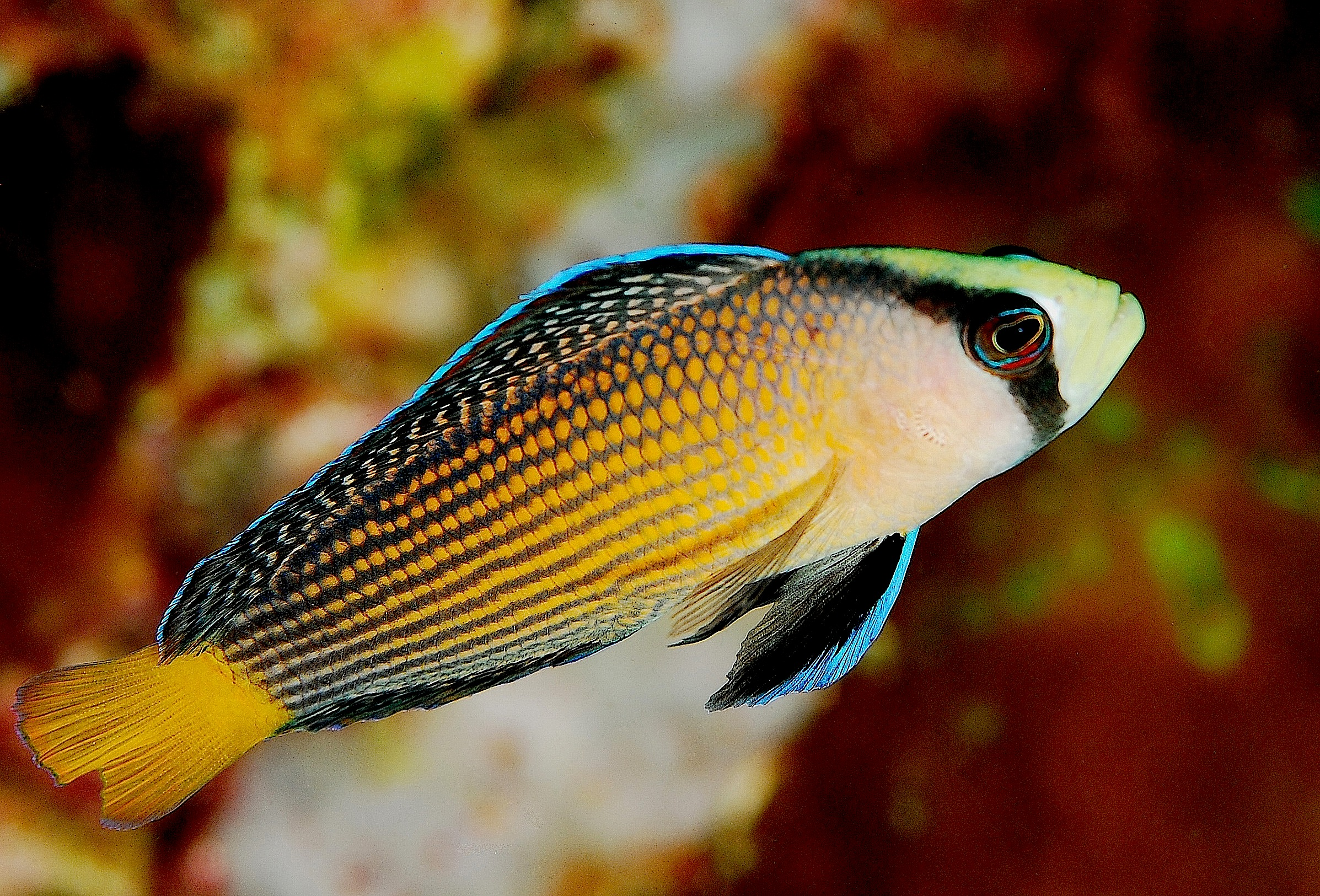
- Splendid dottyback Manonichthys splendens

Scientific classification
- Kingdom: Animalia
- Phylum: Chordata
- Class: Actinopterygii
- Division: Teleostei
- Order: Blenniiformes
- Family: Pseudochromidae; Müller & Troschel, 1849

Subfamilies
- Anisochrominae; Congrogadinae; Pseudochrominae; Pseudoplesiopinae

= Dottyback =

Dottybacks

Family of fishes

The dottybacks are a family, Pseudochromidae, of fishes which were formerly classified in the order Perciformes or considered incertae sedis percomorphs, but are now considered basal blenniiforms. Around 152 species belong to this family.

They are found in the tropical and subtropical Indo-Pacific, where most inhabit coral reefs. Many species are brightly coloured fish, often showing striking sexual dimorphism. They are generally small, mostly less than 10 cm (4 in) in length, and some less than 2 cm (0.8 in). The largest by far, at up to 45 cm (1 ft 6 in), is Congrogadus subducens. Dottybacks are distinguished from other families by the presence of three or less spines in the dorsal fin and an incomplete lateral line organ.

Several of the brightly coloured members of the family are often seen in the marine aquarium trade, although some species are aggressively territorial.

== Genera ==
Family Pseudochromidae

- Subfamily Anisochrominae
  - Anisochromis
- Subfamily Congrogadinae – eel blennies
  - Blennodesmus
  - Congrogadus
  - Halidesmus
  - Halimuraena
  - Halimuraenoides
  - Haliophis
  - Natalichthys
  - Rusichthys
- Subfamily Pseudochrominae
  - Assiculoides
  - Assiculus
  - Cypho
  - Labracinus
  - Manonichthys
  - Ogilbyina
  - Oxycercichthys
  - Pholidochromis
  - Pictichromis
  - Pseudochromis
- Subfamily Pseudoplesiopinae
  - Amsichthys
  - Chlidichthys
    - Chlidichthys inornatus
  - Lubbockichthys
  - Pectinochromis
  - Pseudoplesiops
