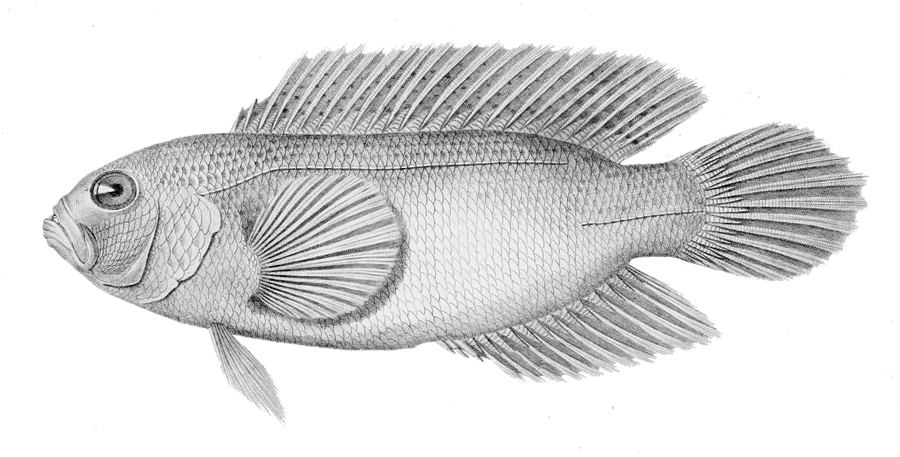

Scientific classification
- Kingdom: Animalia
- Phylum: Chordata
- Class: Actinopterygii
- Order: Blenniiformes
- Family: Pseudochromidae
- Subfamily: Pseudochrominae
- Genus: Labracinus
- Species: L. cyclophthalmus

Binomial name
- Labracinus cyclophthalmus (J.P. Müller & Troschel, 1849)

Synonyms
- Cichlops cyclophthalmus J.P. Müller & Troschel, 1849; Dampieria cyclophthalma J.P. Müller & Troschel, 1849; Dampieria cyclophthalmus J.P. Müller & Troschel, 1849; Julis horsfieldii Valenciennes, 1839; Halichoeres horsfieldi (Valenciennes, 1839); Cichlops melanotaenia Bleeker, 1853; Dampieria melanotaenia (Bleeker, 1853); Labracinus melanotaenia (Bleeker, 1853); Cichlops spilopterus Bleeker, 1853; Dampieria spiloptera (Bleeker, 1853); Cichlops hellmuthii Bleeker, 1854; Cichlops trispilos Bleeker, 1855; Cichlops japonicus T.N. Gill, 1859; Dampieria melanostigma Fowler, 1931; Dampieria ocellifera Fowler, 1946

= Labracinus cyclophthalmus =

Species of fish

Labracinus cyclophthalmus, the fire-tail devil or fire-tailed dottyback, is a species of ray finned fish from the family Pseudochromidae which occurs in the Western Pacific. It occasionally makes its way into the aquarium trade. It grows to a size of 22 centimetres (8.7 in) in length.
