= Manonichthys polynemus =

Conservation status
- Data Deficient (IUCN 3.1)

Scientific classification
- Kingdom: Animalia
- Phylum: Chordata
- Class: Actinopterygii
- Order: Blenniiformes
- Family: Pseudochromidae
- Genus: Manonichthys
- Species: M. polynemus

Binomial name
- Manonichthys polynemus (Fowler, 1931)

Synonyms
- Pseudochromis polynemus Fowler, 1931

Species of fish

Manonichthys polynemus, the longfin dottyback, is a species of ray-finned fish from the family Pseudochromidae, the dottybacks. It occasionally makes its way into the aquarium trade. It grows to a size of 12 cm in length. This species lives solitarily on steep outer reef slopes and in parts of the reef with dense coral growth. Like its congeners, it has been recorded in the body cavities of large sponges. It is uncommon which has a restricted range, being found in Indonesia off northern Sulawesi and nearby islands, in the southern Philippines and Palau.

== See also ==
- List of marine aquarium fish species
