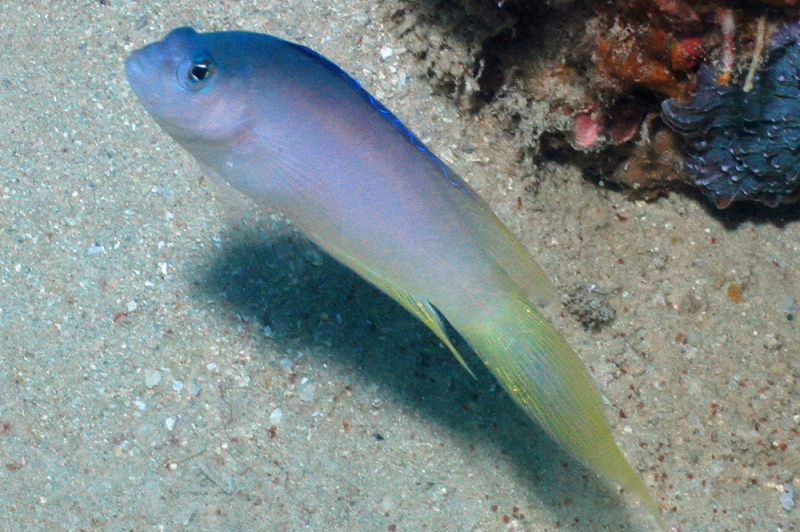

Scientific classification
- Kingdom: Animalia
- Phylum: Chordata
- Class: Actinopterygii
- Order: Blenniiformes
- Family: Pseudochromidae
- Subfamily: Pseudochrominae
- Genus: Oxycercichthys; A. C. Gill, 2004
- Species: O. veliferus

Binomial name
- Oxycercichthys veliferus (Lubbock, 1980)

Synonyms
- Pseudochromis veliferus Lubbock, 1980; Ogilbyina velifera (Lubbock, 1980)

= Sailfin dottyback =

Species of fish

The sailfin dottyback (Oxycercichthys veliferus), also known as the longtail dottyback, is a species of ray-finned fish from the family Pseudochromidae. They can be found in the Western Central Pacific, on the Great Barrier Reef and other coral reefs in the Coral Sea, in the sandy bottoms near rock and coral formations. This fish occasionally makes its way into the aquarium trade. It grows to a size of 12 centimetres (4.7 in) in length. It is pale greyish to yellowish in colour and has bluish upperparts, a bluish dorsal fin which fades to yellow posteriorly and it has a dark blue spot at the anterior end of the dorsal fin.
