= Pholidochromis =

Scientific classification
- Kingdom: Animalia
- Phylum: Chordata
- Class: Actinopterygii
- Order: Blenniiformes
- Family: Pseudochromidae
- Subfamily: Pseudochrominae
- Genus: Pholidochromis; A. C. Gill, 2004

Type species
- Pseudochromis marginatus Lubbock 1980

Genus of fishes

Pholidochromis is a genus of ray-finned fishes from the subfamily Pseudochrominae, which is one of four subfamilies in the dottyback family Pseudochromidae. They occur in the western and central Pacific Ocean.

== Species ==
There are two species in the genus:

- Pholidochromis cerasina A. C. Gill & Tanaka, 2004 (Cherry dottyback)
- Pholidochromis marginatus (Lubbock, 1980) (Margined dottyback)
