= Manonichthys alleni =

Conservation status
- Least Concern (IUCN 3.1)

Scientific classification
- Kingdom: Animalia
- Phylum: Chordata
- Class: Actinopterygii
- Order: Blenniiformes
- Family: Pseudochromidae
- Genus: Manonichthys
- Species: M. alleni

Binomial name
- Manonichthys alleni A. C. Gill, 2004

Species of fish

Manonichthys alleni, the Sabah dottyback is a species of ray-finned fish from the family Pseudochromidae, the dottybacks. It occasionally makes its way into the aquarium trade. It grows to a size of 12 centimetres (4.7 in) in length. This dottyback has only been known from Indonesia and Malaysia, but was recently recorded in Davao Gulf in the southern Philippines. The specific name honours the ichthyologist Gerald R. Allen of the Western Australian Museum in Perth who collected the type specimen and provided photographs of this species which Gill used in his description, as well as being in recognition of Allen's contribution to the knowledge of Indo-Pacific fish and of the support Allen gave Gill in is work on the Pseudochromidae.

== See also ==
- List of marine aquarium fish species
