= Cypho purpurascens =

Scientific classification
- Kingdom: Animalia
- Phylum: Chordata
- Class: Actinopterygii
- Division: Teleostei
- Order: Blenniiformes
- Family: Pseudochromidae
- Genus: Cypho
- Species: C. purpurascens

Binomial name
- Cypho purpurascens (De Vis, 1884)

Synonyms
- Nesiotes purpurascens De Vis, 1884; Pseudochromis purpurascens (De Vis, 1884); Pseudochromis mccullochi Myers, 1932

Species of fish

Cypho purpurascens. the oblique-lined dottyback or the lavender dottyback is a species of ray finned fish from the family Pseudochromidae which occurs in the western Pacific. It occasionally makes its way into the aquarium trade. It grows to a size of 7.5 centimetres (3.0 in) in length. These fish live in pairs, or are solitary, in or in the vicinity of crevices in the reef and holes located in tidal pools, lagoons and on the reef slopes.

== See also ==
- List of marine aquarium fish species
