= Bondfin dottyback =

Scientific classification
- Kingdom: Animalia
- Phylum: Chordata
- Class: Actinopterygii
- Order: Blenniiformes
- Family: Pseudochromidae
- Subfamily: Pseudochrominae
- Genus: Assiculoides
- Species: A. desmonotus

Binomial name
- Assiculoides desmonotus A. C. Gill & Hutchins, 1997

Species of fish

The bondfin dottyback (Assiculoides desmonotus) is a species of ray-finned fish from the subfamily Pseudochrominae, part of the dottyback family Pseudochromidae. It is found in the eastern Indian Ocean off the north-western coasts of Australia. It is the only species in the monotypic genus Assiculoides.
