= Pholidochromis cerasina =

Scientific classification
- Kingdom: Animalia
- Phylum: Chordata
- Class: Actinopterygii
- Order: Blenniiformes
- Family: Pseudochromidae
- Genus: Pholidochromis
- Species: P. cerasina

Binomial name
- Pholidochromis cerasina A. C. Gill & Tanaka, 2004

Species of fish

Pholidochromis cerasina is a species of ray-finned fish from the family Pseudochromidae, the dottybacks, from the Western Pacific. This fish occasionally makes its way into the aquarium trade. It grows to a size of 7.9 cm in length.

== See also ==
- List of marine aquarium fish species
