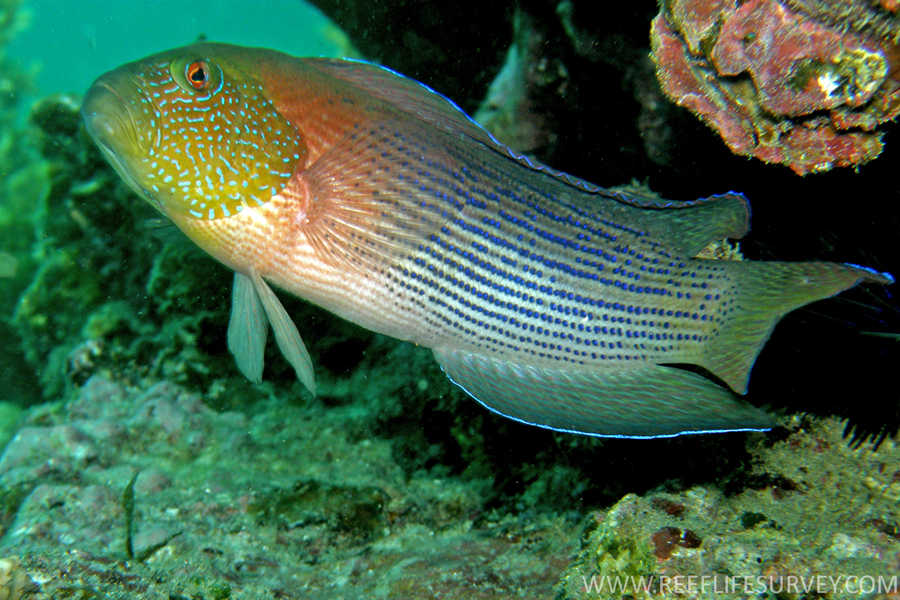
- Labracinus lineatus

Scientific classification
- Kingdom: Animalia
- Phylum: Chordata
- Class: Actinopterygii
- Order: Blenniiformes
- Family: Pseudochromidae
- Subfamily: Pseudochrominae
- Genus: Labracinus; Schlegel, 1858

Type species
- Cichlops cyclophthalmus J.P. Müller & Troschel, 1849

Synonyms
- Cichlops Müller & Troschel, 1849; Dampieria Castelnau, 1875

= Labracinus =

Genus of fishes

Labracinus is a genus of ray-finned fishes from the subfamily Pseudochrominae, which is one of four subfamilies in the dottyback family Pseudochromidae. They are found in the tropical western Pacific Ocean.

== Species ==
There are three species in the genus:

- Labracinus atrofasciatus (Herre, 1933) (Blackbarred dottyback)
- Labracinus cyclophthalmus (J.P. Müller & Troschel, 1849) (Fire-tail devil)
- Labracinus lineatus (Castelnau, 1875) (Lined dottyback)
