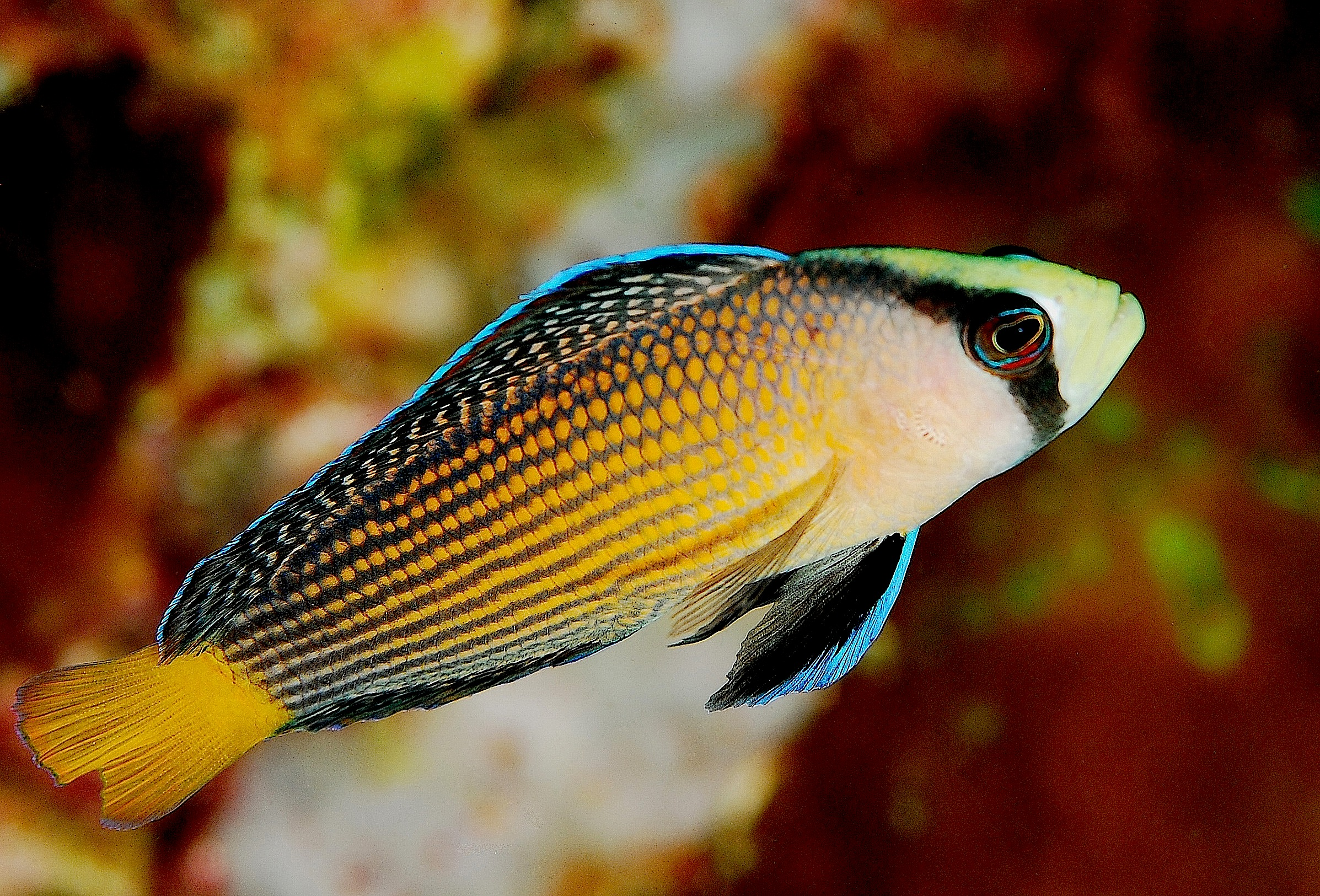
- Manonichthys splendens

Scientific classification
- Kingdom: Animalia
- Phylum: Chordata
- Class: Actinopterygii
- Order: Blenniiformes
- Family: Pseudochromidae
- Subfamily: Pseudochrominae
- Genus: Manonichthys; A. C. Gill, 2004

Type species
- Pseudochromis splendens Fowler, 1931

= Manonichthys =

Genus of fishes

Manonichthys is a genus of ray-finned fishes from the subfamily Pseudochrominae, which is one of four subfamilies in the dottyback family Pseudochromidae. They are found in the tropical eastern Indian Ocean and the western Pacific Ocean. Many of the species of Manonichthys live within the bodies of large sponges, the genus name references the Greek word for a kind of sponge, manon, in combination with the Greek word for "fish", ichthys.

== Species ==
There are seven species in the genus:

- Manonichthys alleni A.C. Gill, 2004 (Sabah dottyback)
- Manonichthys jamali Allen & Erdmann, 2007 (Jamal's dottyback)
- Manonichthys paranox (Lubbock & Goldman, 1976) (Midnight dottyback)
- Manonichthys polynemus (Fowler, 1931) (Longfin dottyback)
- Manonichthys scintilla A.C. Gill & Williams, 2011 (Sparkfin Dottyback)
- Manonichthys splendens (Fowler, 1931) (Splendid dottyback)
- Manonichthys winterbottomi A.C. Gill, 2004 (False midnight dottyback)
