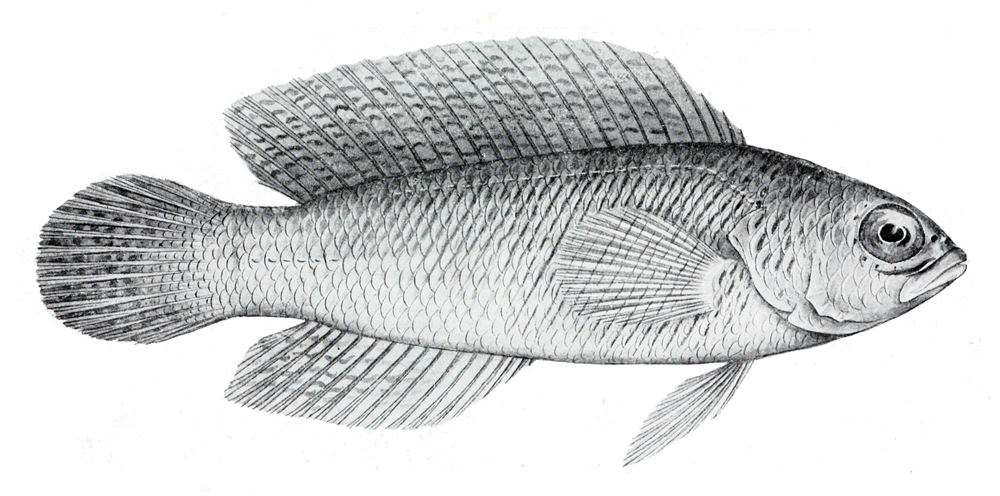
- Cypho purpurascens

Scientific classification
- Kingdom: Animalia
- Phylum: Chordata
- Class: Actinopterygii
- Order: Blenniiformes
- Family: Pseudochromidae
- Subfamily: Pseudochrominae
- Genus: Cypho; Myers, 1940

Type species
- Nesiotes purpurascens De Vis, 1884

= Cypho =

Genus of fishes

Cypho is a genus of ray-finned fishes from the subfamily Pseudochrominae, which is one of four subfamilies in the dottyback family Pseudochromidae. They are found in the tropical western Pacific Ocean as far east as Tonga.

== Species ==
There are two species in the genus:

- Cypho purpurascens De Vis, 1884 (Oblique-lined dottyback)
- Cypho zaps A. C. Gill, 2004 (Checkered dottyback)
