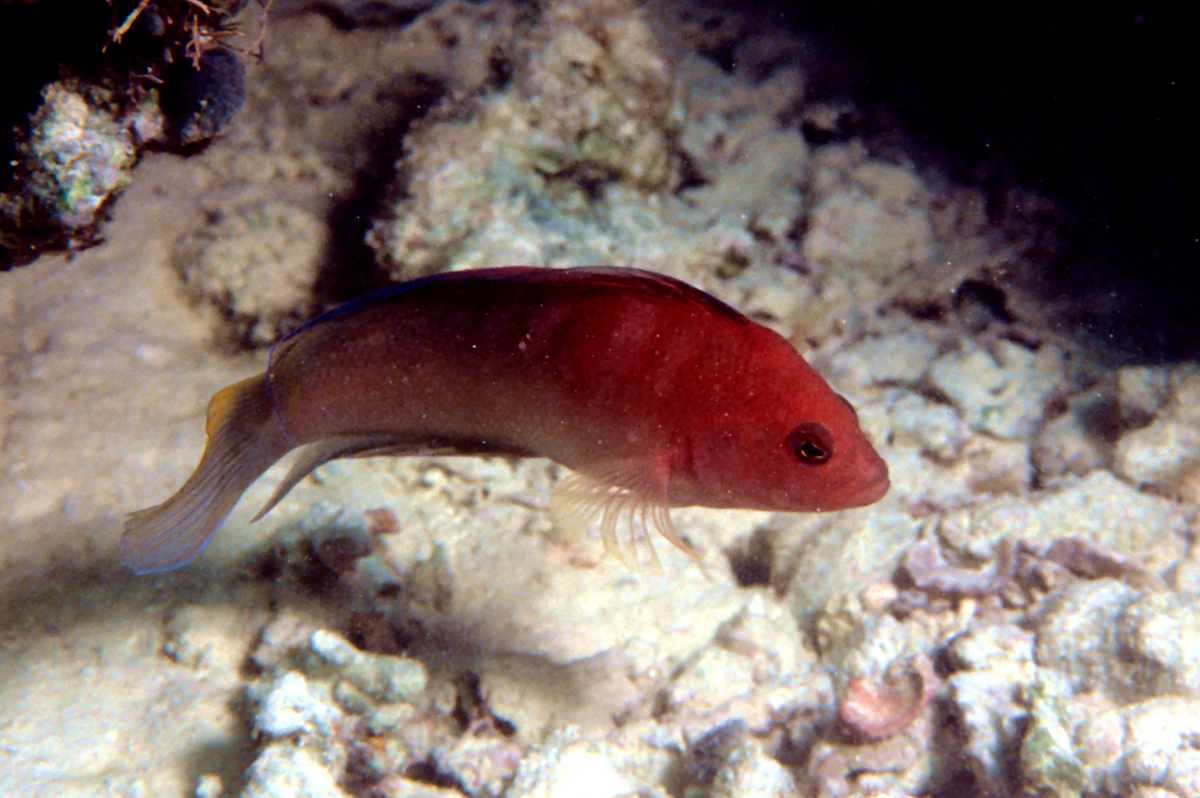
- Ogilbyina queenslandiae

Scientific classification
- Kingdom: Animalia
- Phylum: Chordata
- Class: Actinopterygii
- Order: Blenniiformes
- Family: Pseudochromidae
- Subfamily: Pseudochrominae
- Genus: Ogilbyina; Fowler, 1931

Type species
- Dampieria longipinnis as a synonym of Ogilbyina novaehollandiae Ogilby, 1908

Synonyms
- Klunzingerina Fowler, 1931

= Ogilbyina =

Genus of fishes

Ogilbyina is a genus of ray-finned fishes from the subfamily Pseudochrominae, which is one of four subfamilies in the dottyback family Pseudochromidae. They are found in the tropical western Pacific Ocean. The genus name honours the zoologist James Douglas Ogilby (1853–1925) of the Queensland Museum.

== Species ==
There are three species in the genus:

- Ogilbyina novaehollandiae (Steindachner, 1879) (Multicolour dottyback)
- Ogilbyina queenslandiae (Saville-Kent, 1893) (Queensland dottyback)
- Ogilbyina salvati (Plessis & Fourmanoir, 1966)
