= Ogilbyina novaehollandiae =

Conservation status
- Least Concern (IUCN 3.1)

Scientific classification
- Kingdom: Animalia
- Phylum: Chordata
- Class: Actinopterygii
- Order: Blenniiformes
- Family: Pseudochromidae
- Genus: Ogilbyina
- Species: O. novaehollandiae

Binomial name
- Ogilbyina novaehollandiae (Steindachner, 1879)

Synonyms
- Pseudochromis novaehollandiae Steindachner, 1879; Dampiera longipinnis Ogilby, 1908; Labracinus longipinnis (Ogilby, 1908)

Species of fish

Ogilbyina novaehollandiae, the multicolour dottyback, is a species of ray-finned fish from the family Pseudochromidae, the dottybacks from the Western Central Pacific where it is confined to the Great Barrier Reef. This fish occasionally makes its way into the aquarium trade. It grows to a size of 10 centimetres (3.9 in) in length.
