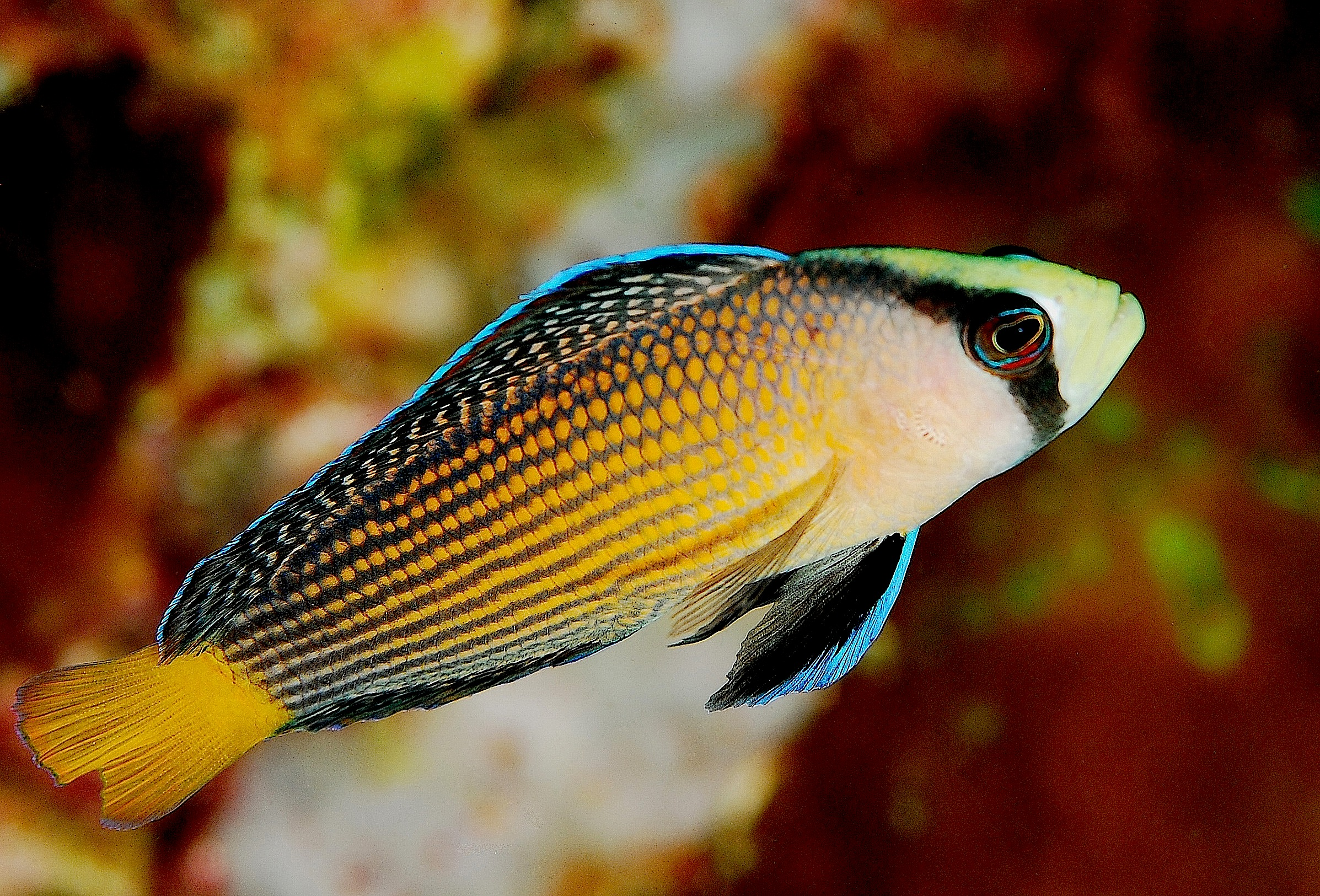

Conservation status
- Least Concern (IUCN 3.1)

Scientific classification
- Kingdom: Animalia
- Phylum: Chordata
- Class: Actinopterygii
- Order: Blenniiformes
- Family: Pseudochromidae
- Genus: Manonichthys
- Species: M. splendens

Binomial name
- Manonichthys splendens (Fowler, 1931)

Synonyms
- Pseudochromis splendens Fowler, 1931

= Manonichthys splendens =

Species of fish

Manonichthys splendens, common name splendid dottyback, is a species of marine ray-finned fish in the family Pseudochromidae, the dottybacks. It occurs in the Indo-West Pacific and occasionally makes its way into the aquarium trade. It grows to a size of 13 cm (5.1 in) in length.

== Gallery ==
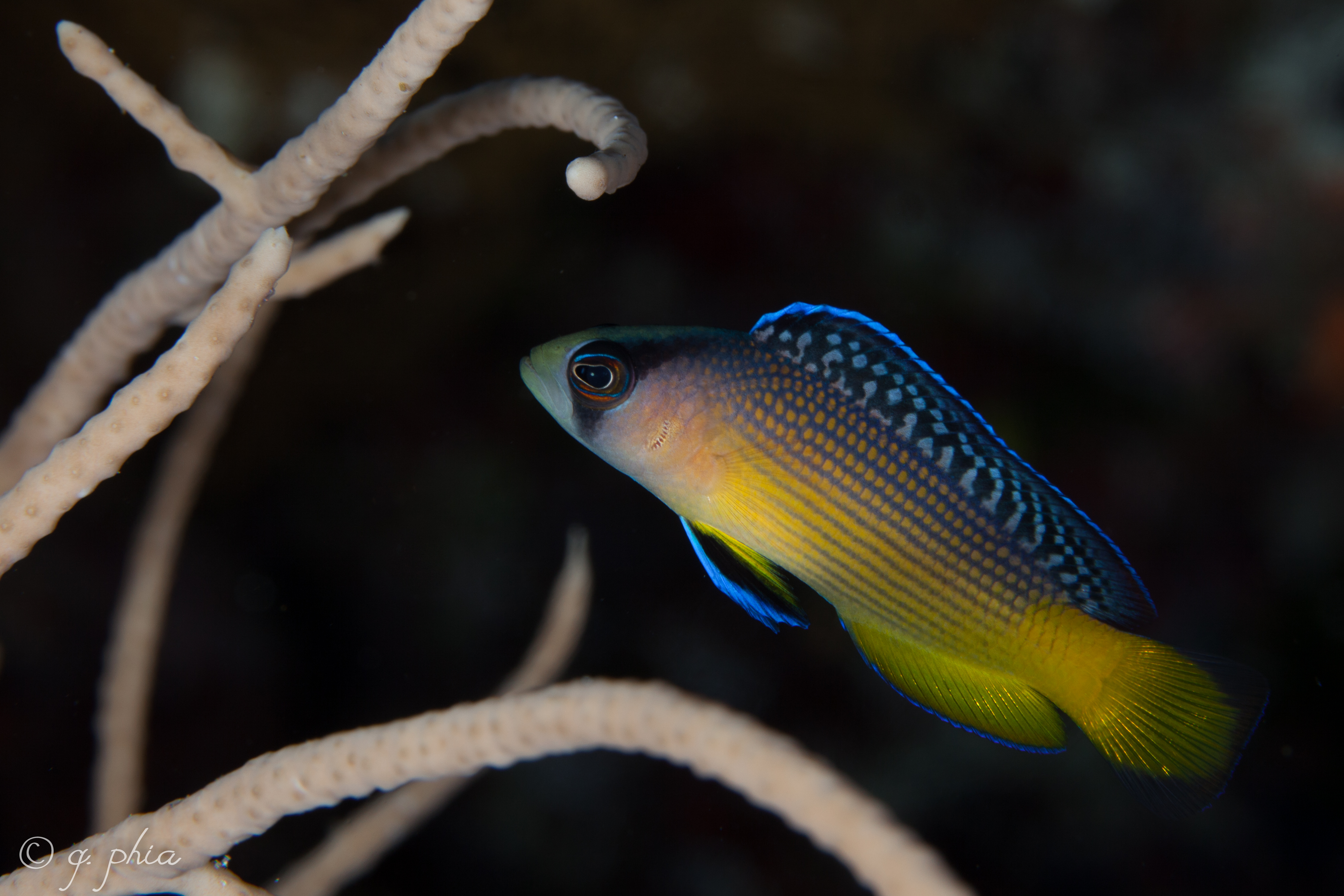
Splendid dottyback at Wakatobi National Park Indonesia, 2016

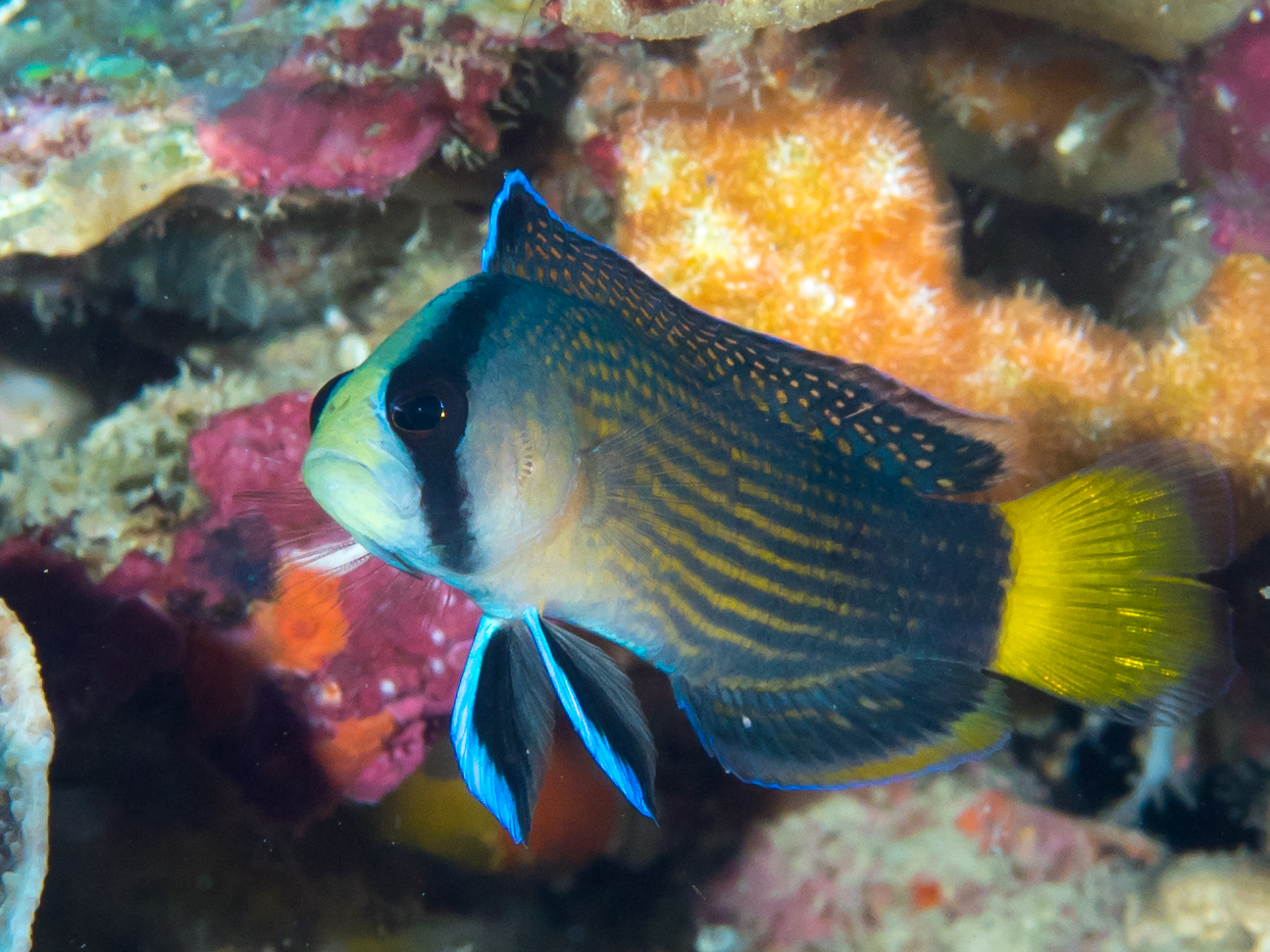
Splendid dottyback at Morotai, Indonesia

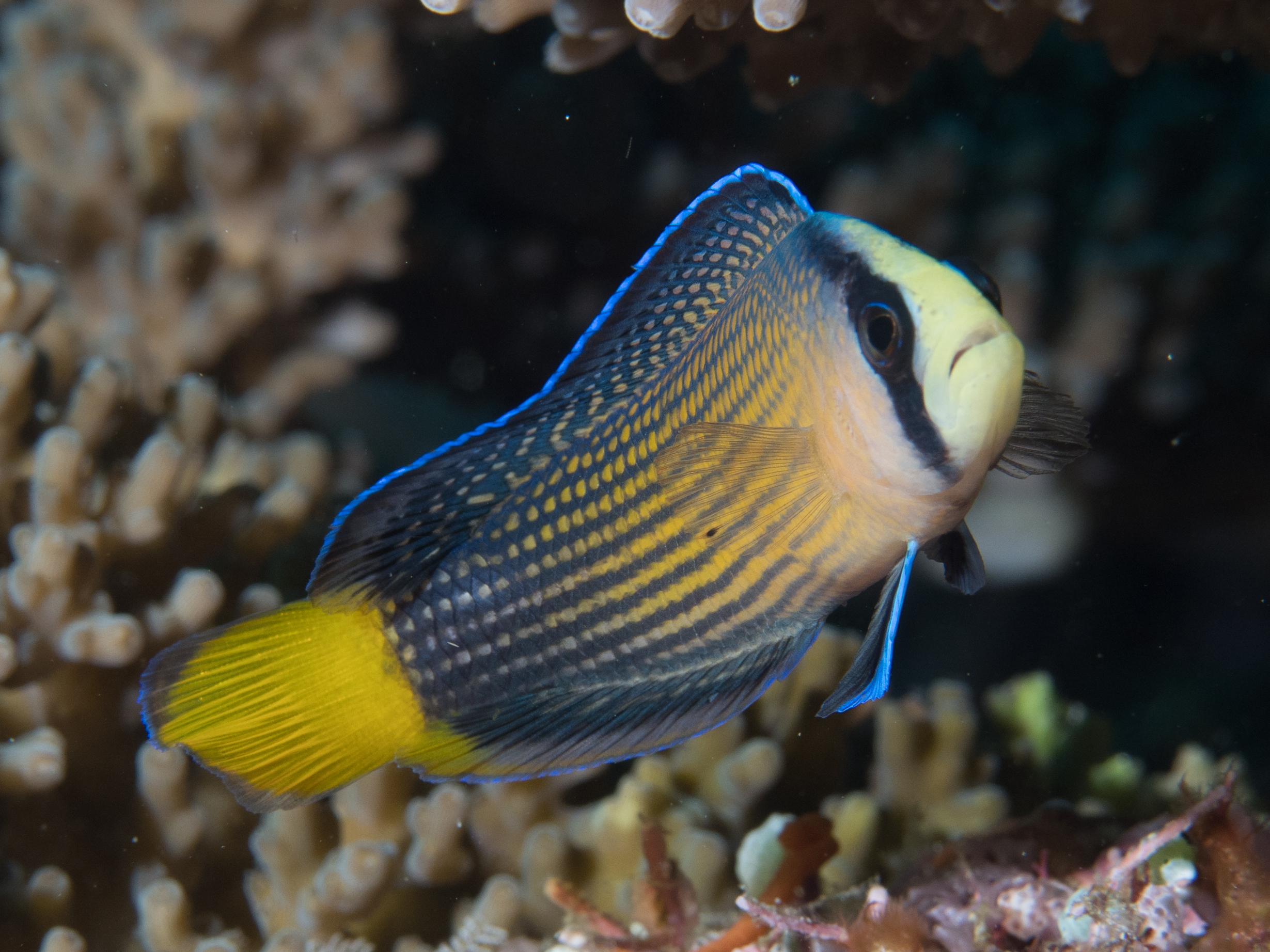
Splendid dottyback at Raja Ampat, Indonesia, 2019

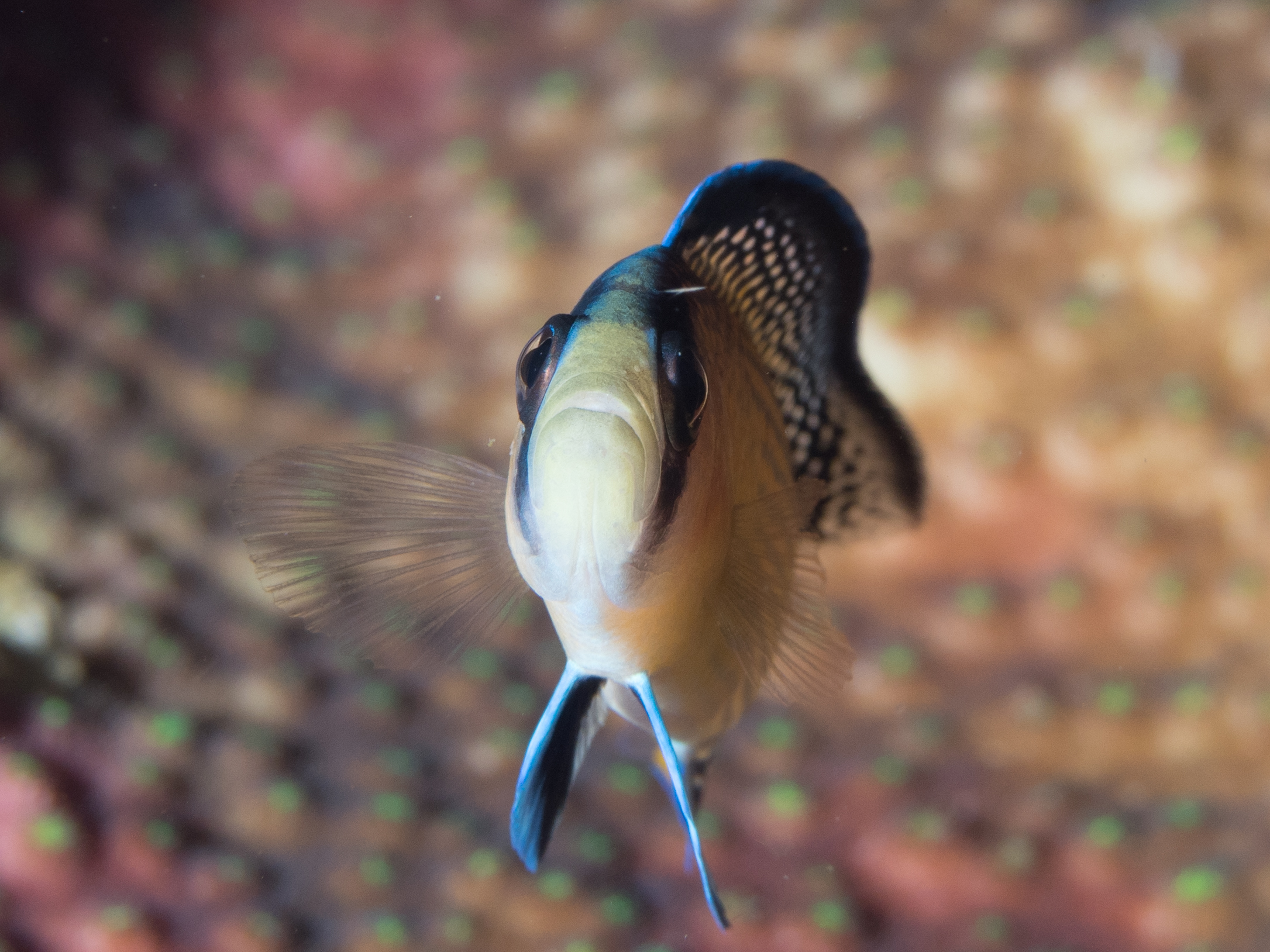
Splendid dottyback at Raja Ampat, Indonesia, 2019
