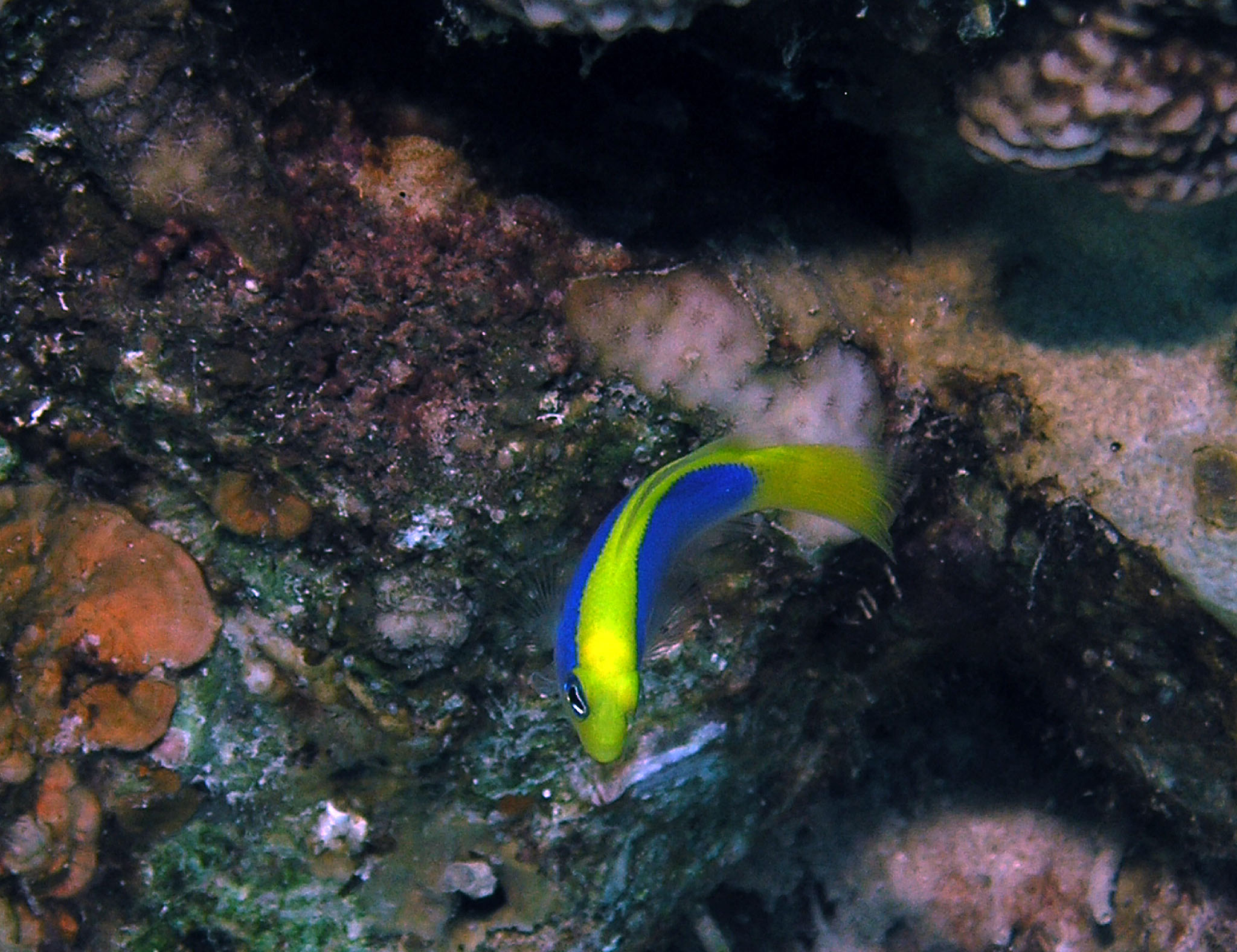
- Sunrise dottyback Pseudochromis flavivertex
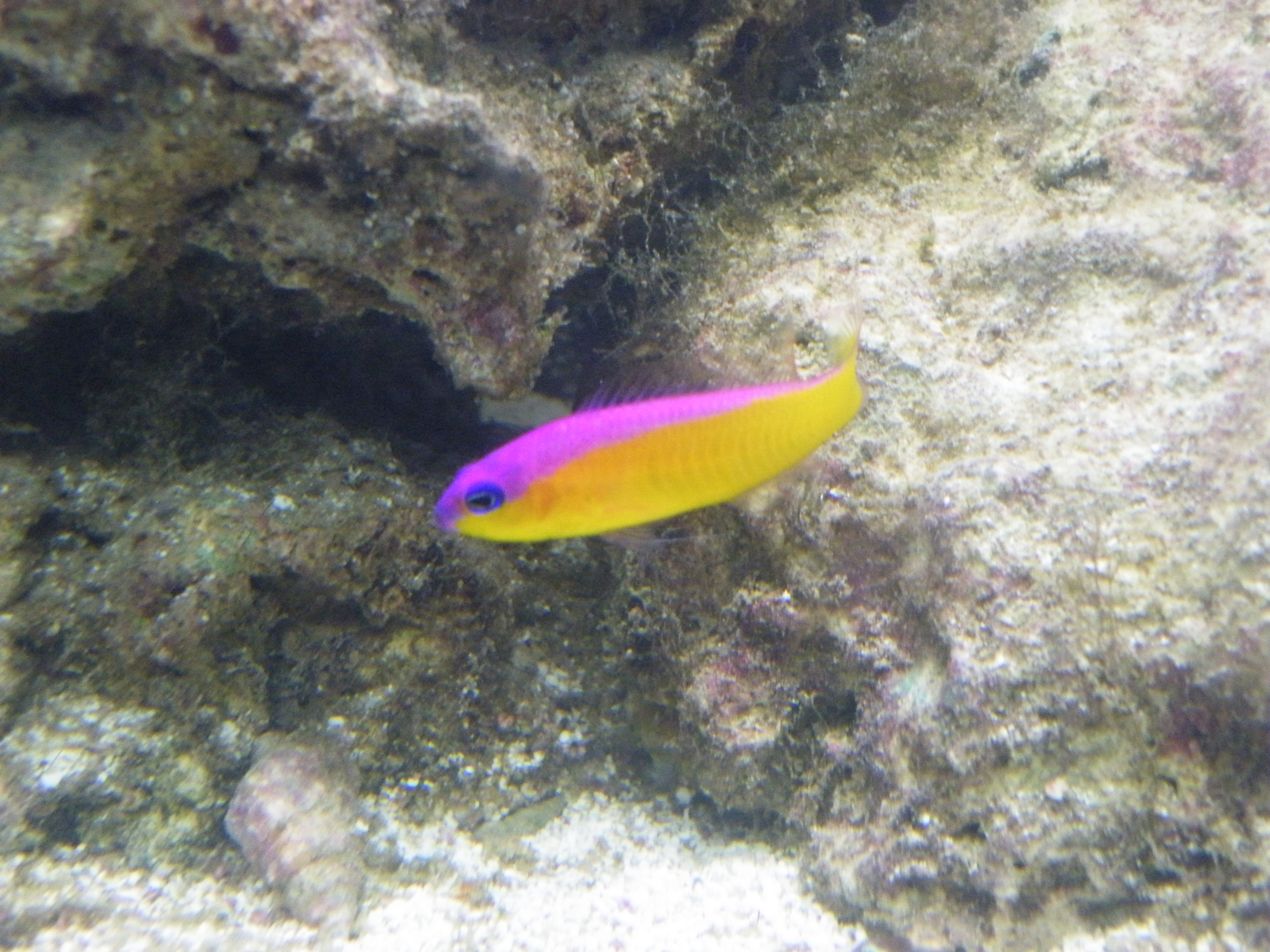
- Diadem dottyback Pictichromis diadema

Scientific classification
- Kingdom: Animalia
- Phylum: Chordata
- Class: Actinopterygii
- Order: Blenniiformes
- Family: Pseudochromidae
- Subfamily: Pseudochrominae; Müller & Troschel, 1849

= Pseudochrominae =

Subfamily of fishes

Pseudochrominae is a subfamily of ray-finned fishes, one of four subfamilies that make up the family Pseudochromidae, the species within the subfamily are commonly called dottybacks. They are small reef-associated marine fish which have an Indo-Pacific distribution.

== Characteristics ==
In the Pseudochrominae the pelvic fin has a single spine and five rays which are branched, the head is covered in scales, there are teeth on the palatine bone and there are 16-20 rays in the pectoral fin. The lateral line is divided into two, with a longer part running from the head to the posterior part of the dorsal fin and located just below the dorsal fin and the other, shorter part on the rear of the flanks. They grow to a maximum length of 19 centimetres (7.5 in).

== Distribution ==
The subfamily Pseudochrominae has a widespread distribution in the Indian Ocean and western Pacific Ocean, mainly in tropical areas. Their distribution extends from the eastern coast of Africa, east across the Indo-Pacific region to American Samoa. The southern limits of the distribution is Durban in South Africa and the Elizabeth Reef in the northern Tasman Sea off Australia and north as far as southern Japan.

== Biology ==
The species in the Pseudochrominae are mainly associated with reefs, with several species which are found among branching corals and some other species live within large sponges, dottybacks are found from the intertidal shallows down to depths of 100 metres (330 ft). A few pseudochromines are social but most are fiercely territorial, defending small areas as home ranges and usually live solitarily, as pairs or very small groups of a male and a few females. They are normally predators of small invertebrates such as crustaceans, small bivalves and gastropods, polychaetes and some small fish. There appear to be little variety in the types of prey taken by different species other than larger species prey on larger prey items. Many species are hermaphroditic, some may be simultaneously hermaphroditic while other species are protogynous hermaphrodites or protandrous hermaphrodites and they adopt the colouring and pattern of the different sex as they transform. Many species produce a "fluffy", round egg mass which the male often guards in a small cave or burrow, the mass is formed by the interlinking of the filaments which cover the half of the surface of each egg which is opposite the micropyle, these filaments are attached to the surface of the egg by a small loaf-like structure. These loaf structures are diagnostic of the pseudochromines. The males guard the eggs until they hatch, which varies from 3–7 days after hatching the pelagic larvae disperse.

== Genera ==
The following genera are classifies within the subfamily Pseudochrominae:

- Assiculoides A.C.Gill & Hutchins 1997
- Assiculus Richardson, 1846
- Cypho Myers, 1940
- Labracinus Schlegel, 1858
- Manonichthys A.C.Gill, 2004
- Ogilbyina Fowler, 1931
- Oxycercichthys A.C.Gill, 2004
- Pholidochromis A.C.Gill, 2004
- Pictichromis A.C.Gill, 2004
- Pseudochromis Rüppell, 1835
