= Batrachopus =

Batrachopus may refer to:

- Batrachopus (reptile), an ichnogenus of crocodylomorph tracks
- Batrachopus, a genus of grasshoppers in the family Romaleidae, synonym of Antandrus
- Batrachopus, a genus of fishes in the family Antennariidae, synonym of Histrio
