= Bosma =

Bosma is a West Frisian toponymic surname meaning "from/of the forest". Variants are Boschma, Boskma and Bossema. Notable people with the surname include:

Bosma

- Brian Bosma (born 1957), American politician from Indiana
- Javier Bosma (born 1969), Spanish beach volleyball player
- Koen Bosma (born 1990), Dutch football player
- Martin Bosma (born 1964), Dutch politician and journalist
- Remco Bosma (born 1971), Dutch politician
- Tim Bosma (died 2013), Canadian murder victim

Boschma

- Hilbrand Boschma (1893–1976), Dutch zoologist and museum director
  - Named after him: Boschma's frogfish and Boschma's scampi
- Suze Boschma-Berkhout (1922–1997), Dutch sculptor

== See also ==
- Bosman, Dutch surname
