= Bare Island (New South Wales) =

Heritage-listed islet in Sydney, Australia

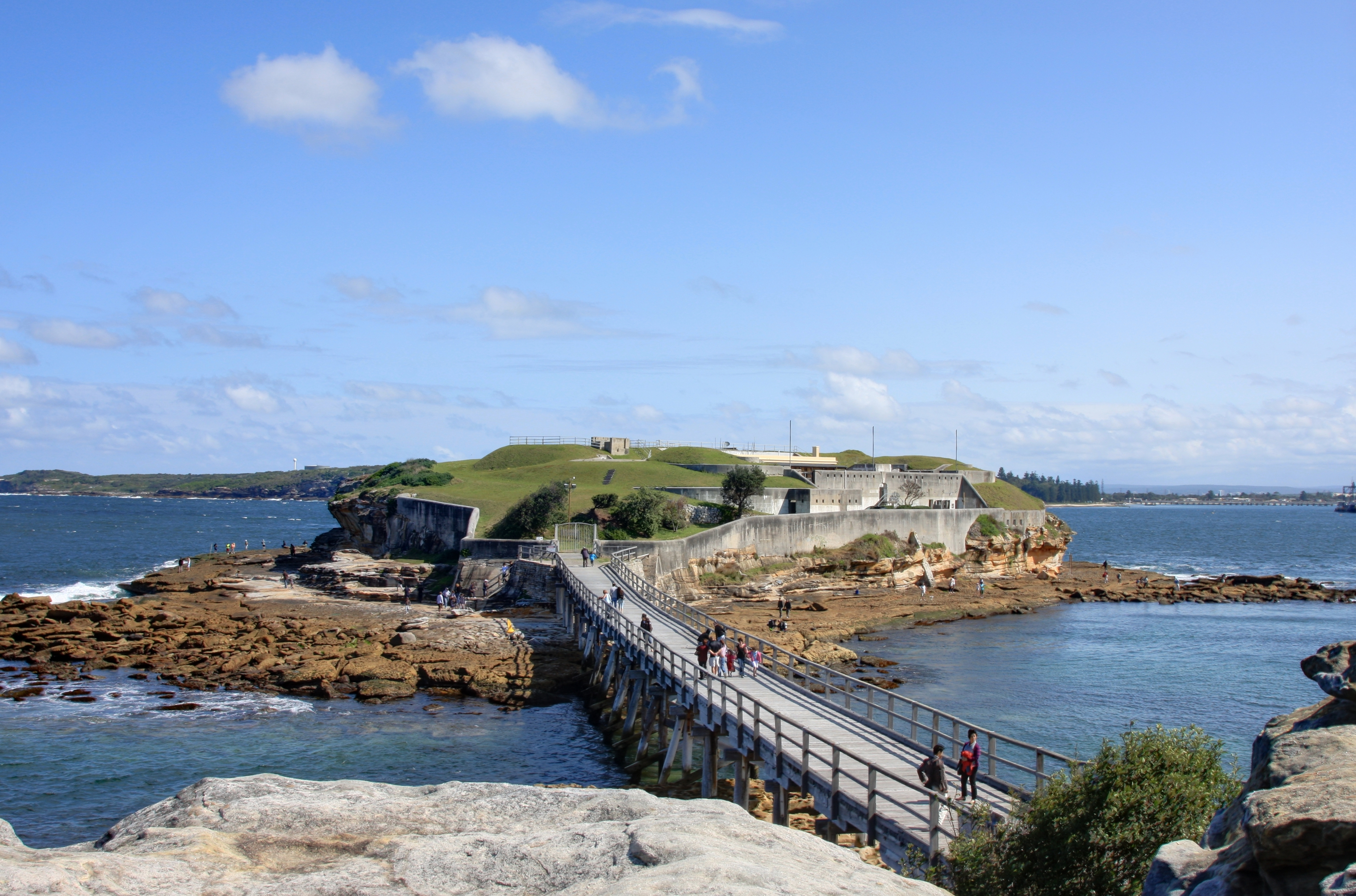
- Footbridge from La Perouse leading to Bare Island

- Location within inner Sydney

Geography
- Location: La Perouse, Sydney, New South Wales, Australia
- Coordinates: 33°59′32″S 151°13′52″E
- Adjacent to: Botany Bay

Demographics
- Population: unpopulated

Additional information
- Building details
- Former names: Bare Island Fort

General information
- Status: Historic site
- Type: Former fortification; Former War Veterans' Home; Former museum
- Construction started: 1881
- Completed: 1889
- Owner: Office of Environment and Heritage

Design and construction
- Architects: Sir Peter Scratchley; Gustave Morell; James Barnet
- Main contractor: John McLeod, NSW Public Works

New South Wales Heritage Register
- Official name: Bare Island Fort
- Type: State heritage (complex / group)
- Criteria: a., c., d., e., f., g.
- Designated: 2 April 1999
- Reference no.: 978
- Type: Fortification
- Category: Defence
- Builders: John McLeod; NSW Department of Public Works

Bare Island is a heritage-listed islet located at La Perouse, New South Wales in the Eastern Suburbs of Sydney in eastern Australia. The islet is located about 16 kilometres (9.9 mi) south east of the Sydney central business district, within Botany Bay, close to the bay's northern headland. Containing former fortification facilities, Bare Island was a former war veterans' home and museum and is now a historic site that was added to the New South Wales State Heritage Register on 2 April 1999 and is significant as an almost completely intact example of late nineteenth century coastal defence technology. It was designed by Sir Peter Scratchley, Gustave Morell and James Barnet and built from 1881 to 1889 by John McLeod on behalf of the NSW Department of Public Works.

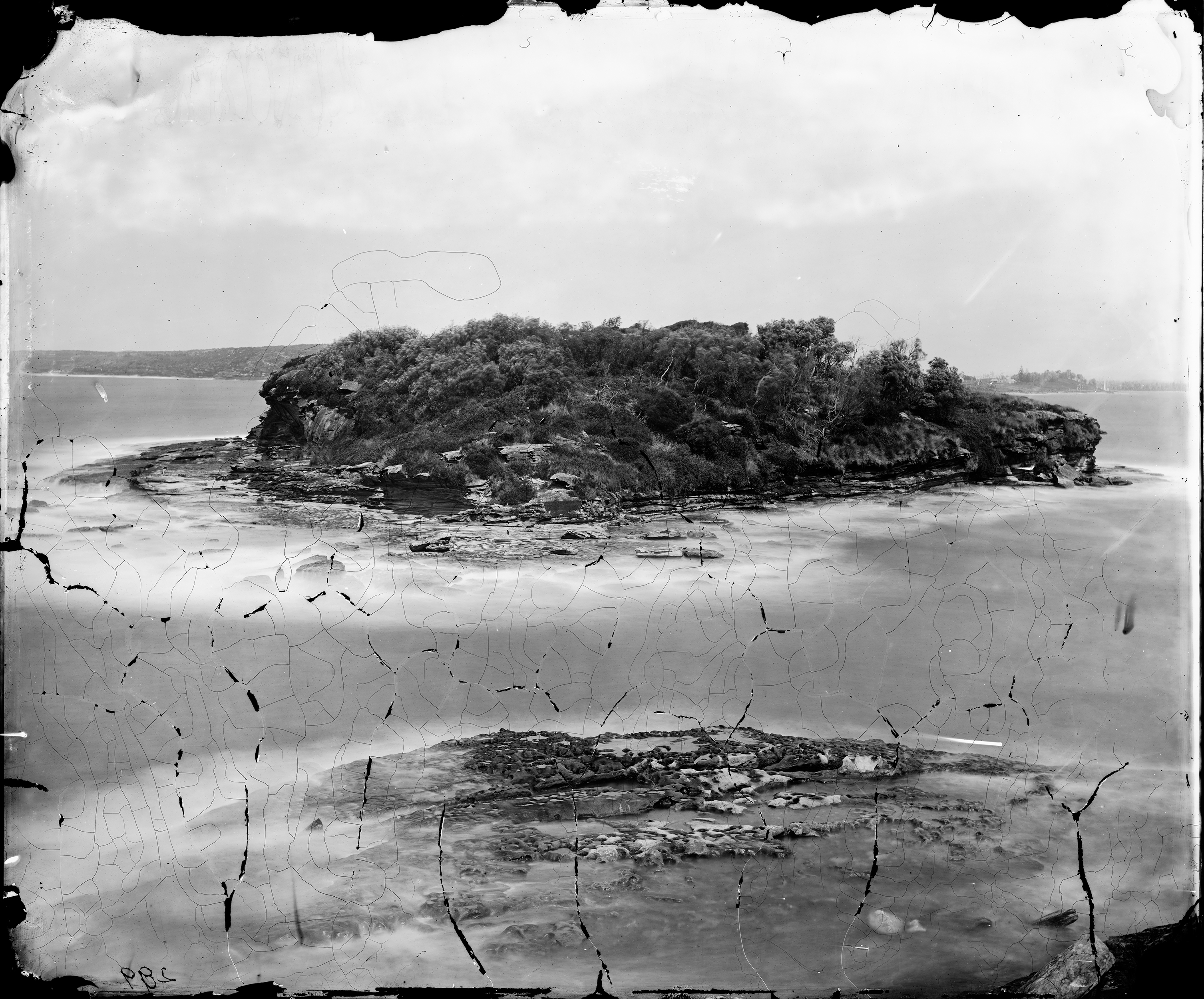
Bare Island (before fortifications), Sydney, Australia, ca. 1873

Bare Island is connected by a footbridge to the mainland of La Perouse. The heritage-listed military fort and tunnels can only be visited by guided tour. The waters around the island are popular with scuba divers. The Bare Island anglerfish is named after this island.

== History ==
Prior to the arrival of Europeans in 1770 & 1788 the Gweagal and Kameygal Aboriginal groups were the undisputed owners of Bare Island.; it was part of what they called Kamay or Gamay. The island is mentioned in the journals of both Joseph Banks and James Cook: Banks collected shell specimens there, while Cook, who described it as "a small bare island", noted that it provided a convenient navigational marker. The name stuck from this first usage & as such it is one of the first European names for a part of the east coast.

After Cook, Governor Phillip and French navigator Jean-Francois de La Perouse were the next to enter Botany Bay, anchoring off its northern reaches. Neither group is definitely known to have visited Bare Island, but it is more than likely that they did. The French built a stockade and (kitchen) garden nearby (300 metres (980 ft) from the Macquarie Tower) towards Frenchmans Bay and buried their chaplain Father (Père) Receveur. there.

William Bradley, in his journal "A Voyage to New South Wales", relates that in July 1788 noticeboards were erected on the island to advise visiting ships that the settlement had moved to Port Jackson.

For most of the 19th century the area was considered remote from the nucleus of Sydney. Early industries included fishing, shell gathering & market gardening as well as noxious trades such as tanneries, boiling down works & fell-mongering at nearby Botany & Banksmeadow. An Aboriginal community has always been present in & around La Perouse. The north-eastern hinterland of Botany Bay was also of prime importance to nascent Sydney because it supplied the city's water from the 1850s to 1888 https://dictionaryofsydney.org › media. The removal of all remaining garrison troops from Australian colonies excepting those retained and paid for by colonial governments as a result of the Cardwell reforms in the late 1860s forced a rethink of local defence preparedness, especially with the outbreak of hostilities between Russia and Britain in 1876. At the same time, the La Perouse headland was chosen as the location for the first submarine cable, which came ashore permanently in 1879. As a result, the Australian colonies requested the services of an Imperial Engineer to advise them on defence matters. Military engineers Scratchley and Jervois were sent. Colonial architect James Barnet designed & built the Cable Station building, completed in 1882.

=== Fortification facilities ===
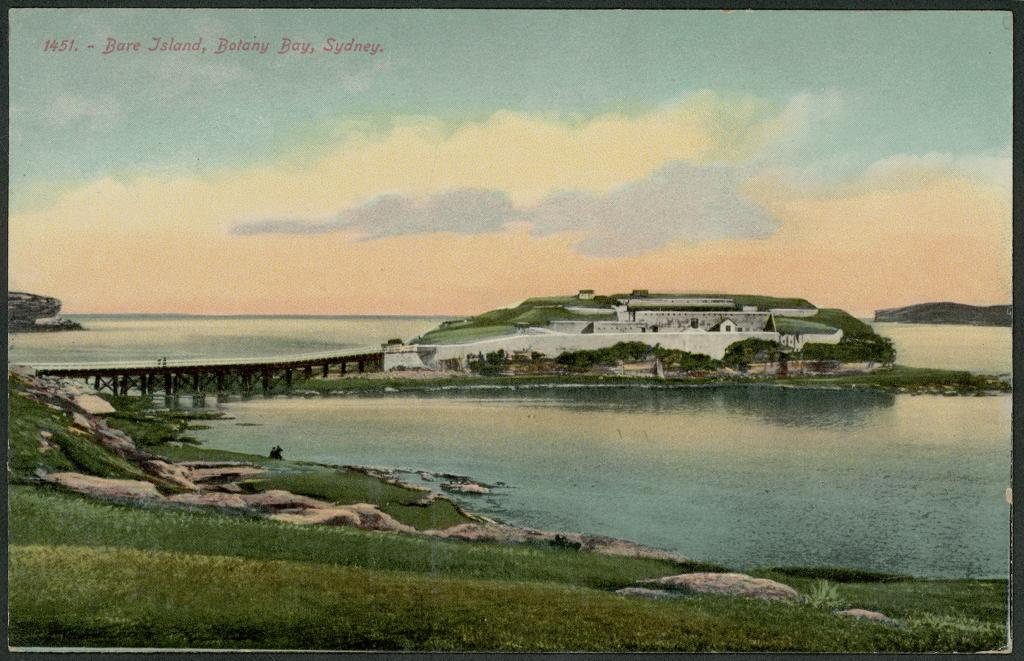
Bare Island, 1910

Jervois recommended a small work in Botany Bay as protection from small squadrons of hostile cruisers making lightning raids on Sydney and holding it to ransom for its gold reserves. Scratchley was responsible for turning Jervois's strategic vision into a detailed design and specification of the works. This he did with the aid of civil engineer Gustavus Morell. The specifications were also developed with the aid of the Colonial Architect James Barnet who was responsible for its construction. Construction of Bare Island fort was completed in 1885 at a cost of A£34,000; work inside the fort began in 1889.

Bare Island Fort reflects the development of coastal fortifications design by the British Army, from locations around the world over more than a century. This was combined with a newly generated understanding of ballistics and materials science that was a product of the late nineteenth century Industrial Revolution. Bare Island, in comparison to earlier coastal defences constructed in Australia, such as Fort Denison or the Middle Head Batteries, shows the impact of new materials such as concrete, as well as the ever-increasing power of guns.

The design and construction was complex. The basis of the design was a symmetrical crescent, with the heaviest gun in the centre, which faced the likely line of attack. The various stages in the design of Bare Island took from mid 1877 to early 1880 when the final design was specified and contracted out. Even then, Scratchley still did not consider the design complete and regularly made alterations and suggestions, some verbally and some in writing.

Plans for a fort were drawn up by the Colonial Architect's department, and government tender for construction was awarded to a building company led by John McLeod, who also built the Georges Head and Middle Head fortifications. McLeod won the tender in 1881 and commenced work on 7 April. His work was supervised by Public Works Department Clerk of Works Henry Purkis who was responsible for many other projects which called him away from Bare Island for extended periods. Following Scratchley's death in 1885 overall supervision of the project was delegated to Major Penrose.

Construction was completed in 1886, but by 1887 problems began to emerge as a result of poor construction. Between 1888 and 1889 barracks were constructed using the same contractor. The job did not go to tender. Lieutenant Colonel De Wolski raised questions as to the appropriateness of the barracks design and location, as well as the fact that tenders had not been called for its construction. A Board of Inquiry was established to investigate his concerns, but work continued. De Wolski complained and the work and contract were suspended. The fort was armed with two RML 9 inch 12 ton guns, two RML 80 pounder guns, a RML 10 inch 18 ton gun in an armoured casemate, and two five–barreled 0.45-inch (1.1 cm) Nordenfelt guns.

At the same time, a Royal Commission of Inquiry was established into the contract and construction of Bare Island. This inquiry found that the Colonial Architect Barnet was responsible for the mismanagement of works at Bare Island. This finding and the controversy surrounding it led to Barnet's premature retirement from public life. McLeod was never awarded another government tender and Barnet resigned from his position around that time too. The bridge to the island was added in 1887. Until then, access relied on a flying fox (zip line), or a barge. It was by barge that the five major guns on the island – including a 12 tonne cannon – were brought across. During its operating years, the barracks were manned by about 70 soldiers. Bare Island was transferred to the Commonwealth in 1901. The garrison was reduced in 1902 and by 1908 it does not appear that any substantial military activity was occurring there.

=== War veterans' home ===
In the early 1900s the fort was decommissioned and soon after it became the first war veterans' home in Australia. After petitioning from local women's groups, in 1912 the first seven war veterans moved in. Between 1912 and 1963 the island was used as a war veterans home, except during World War 2 when it was again used for military purposes.

In the 1930s the guns on the island were sold (for scrap metal, during the Depression) but the larger two were left on the island, because they were too heavy to be brought back across the bridge.

The army took over the fort in 1942 when Japan entered World War 2 and the veterans made way for 24 servicemen known as the "Bare section". In 1962 the army offered to sell the island to the War Veterans' Home for a fee of one pound, but the offer was declined. It continued to operate as a retirement home until 1963, when Randwick Historical Society became caretakers of the island.

=== Use as a museum ===
The island was notified as a Reserve for Public Recreation on 12 March 1965. Between 1963 and 1967 Randwick Historical Society controlled Bare Island and carried out works. They also involved other groups such as the Fort Artillery Society who wore period costumes and conducted live firings of the 9 inch gun. These were very popular and became established as a regular attraction.

Bare Island Historic Site was gazetted 1 October 1967 under the care of NSW National Parks and Wildlife Service (NPWS), although the Randwick Historical Society continued to maintain their museum and its associated activities. The live firings were stopped in 1974.

The fort was open to the public until 28 December 1989, the day of the earthquake in Newcastle.

The current use of the island by NPWS is for interpretation through guided tours (see endorsed conservation plan, 1997).

Randwick City Council is finalising a move to lease the La Perouse museum precinct from the NPWS. The area council will take over includes the former La Perouse former cable station (now the museum, pictured) and historic structures including the Macquarie Watchtower, the La Perouse Monument and the Pere Receveur Tomb. NPWS deputy chief executive Michael Wright said the change would lead to an improvement in facilities, which would attract more visitors and also provide better access for people to explore the area. The Bare Island fort has since been declared an historic site. The site is open to guided tours, available most Sundays.

=== Popular culture ===
Veteran film maker Charles Chauvel used establishing shots of the fort to portray an Arab citadel in his classic Forty Thousand Horsemen (1940).

Bare Island was featured in Mission: Impossible 2, East West 101, and the finale of Netflix reboot of The Mole.

== Description ==
Bare Island is a low sandstone island about 30 metres (98 feet) from the shore of the southern end of La Perouse Headland, near the entrance to Botany Bay. The island has been completely altered from its natural profile & as the old photo included above shows this is a great pity. The fortification complex has served no real purpose at all; as far as defense goes it is a piece of gesticulation. It comprises the battery, barracks buildings, parade and courtyard, access bridge and laboratory room/guards quarters. The fabric of the complex is best described in relation to the 6 phases of occupation identified by Gojak:

Phase I, 1880–1890 Original fortification works by McLeod

Includes all major concrete work and earthworks, the bridge, original space functions and finishes. Characteristic materials are mass concrete with sandstone aggregate, cement render, cream fired brick, checker pattern salt-glazed tiles under asphalt, some reinforcing, armour plate, use of vaulting to span tunnels and much of the timber detailing. see endorsed conservation plan, 1997

Phase II, 1890–1912 Second phase fortification works by de Wolski and others, primarily before 1895

Includes mainly the Barracks and the installation of a hydro-pneumatic gun and stores. Characteristic materials include concrete with finer bluestone aggregate, reinforcing beams to span voids, some conduit, red tuckpoint brickwork with dressed sandstone quoins and lintels, some paint finishes.

Phase III, 1912–1963 War Veterans Home, primarily around 1912, then a second phase of activity in 1939

Includes minor modifications in all areas of the Fort. Characteristic materials include paint finishes, timber flooring inside store rooms, some conduits and cabling, alterations to original use of spaces and installation or removal of internal walls. Changes also made to Barracks with opening up of new access passages, and circulation routes.

Phase IV, 1941–1945 World War II military usage

No definite evidence of this period beyond possible painted signage.

Phase V, 1963–c. 1975 Randwick Historical Society Museum; includes the period when Museum was in operation, both before and after NPWS ownership

Characteristic evidence includes reinstatement and reproduction of original features by removal of later material, mainly War Veterans period, or addition of material to a presumed original form, also some repairs, paint finishes, resurfacing of floors, especially in Caretakers area in the lower floor of the Barracks building.

Phase VI, 1975–present NPWS administration

All changes made since Randwick Historical Society vacated island. Mainly constitutes large scale repair and conservation work to retaining walls, Barracks verandah, roof of casemate, drainage system, removal of more recent additions and provision of safety works.

=== Recreation ===
Bare Island is the most popular scuba diving site in New South Wales. On a sunny summer Sunday there can be as many as 200 divers here during the day. It is a common diver training location and also very popular for snorkeling.

The reefs that stretch around the island and out to the south and west are home to some of Australia's most colourful marine animals. Things to be seen include big belly sea horses, sea dragons, pygmy pipehorses, red Indian fish and all the usual fish seen around Sydney. People have also seen seals and grey nurse sharks at times and in late winter Port Jackson sharks are very common.

On the seaward side of the island a bombora works in southerly swells, providing at times spectacular big waves for intrepid boardriders. It was first surfed by well known Sydney-born surfer Scott Dillon. A well-known photo from the early 1960s shows him dropping into a wave estimated to be about 10 m.

Divers, surfers, swimmers & fishermen - & the general public too - should know that dangerous sharks also frequent these waters. In 2018 a woman was attacked by a juvenile great white while swimming at Congwong Beach; in 2022 there was a fatal attack on a young diving instructor at nearby Malabar.

=== Condition ===
As at 14 December 2000, the archaeological potential to reveal information not available from other sources about the construction and use of the Fort is high, as is the potential to derive information that cannot be found on other sites. Intactness is high. The structure retains enough of the original fabric to enable its form, functions and interrelationships to be easily established. The integrity of the complex is high. Most facets of the structure and its functions survive.

=== Modifications and dates ===
- 1985 to 1987 – Bridge repair
- 1993 – Structural repairs
- 1997 – Major conservation works including waterproofing

== Heritage listing ==
As at 18 May 2010, Bare Island is nationally significant as an almost completely intact example of late nineteenth century coastal defence technology. Designed by Sir Peter Scratchley to a specification by William Jervoise, it represents one of the more substantial and impressive of the many fortifications built around Australasia. The Fort reflects the evolution of the relationship between New South Wales as an increasingly independent colony and Britain. It shows the way that strategic defence policy was operating in Australia on the eve of Federation. The Fort is also nationally significant as the site of the first War Veterans Home founded in Australia. This reflects the social and moral obligations felt by Australians early this century to the veterans of wars fought across the British Empire. It is an early major construction from mass concrete, at a time when the use of this material was still uncommon and not well understood. The Fort is of State significance for its pivotal role in the closure of the career of James Barnet, NSW Colonial Architect. It has significant impacts on the way publicly funded construction was carried out in New South Wales after that time. The Fort is regionally significant as the only island in Botany Bay. The form of the island has been changed by the construction of the Fort, to present a functional structure which nonetheless is of high aesthetic value. It is an important example of fortification design which demonstrates the evolution of the theory of coastal defence, the technology of defence and coastal fortification design. The Fort is regionally significant to the general community as part of the recreational and historic landscape of Botany Bay. Bare Island has particular local significance to the La Perouse community as an item of local heritage value.

Bare Island Fort was listed on the New South Wales State Heritage Register on 2 April 1999 having satisfied the criteria.

== Gallery ==
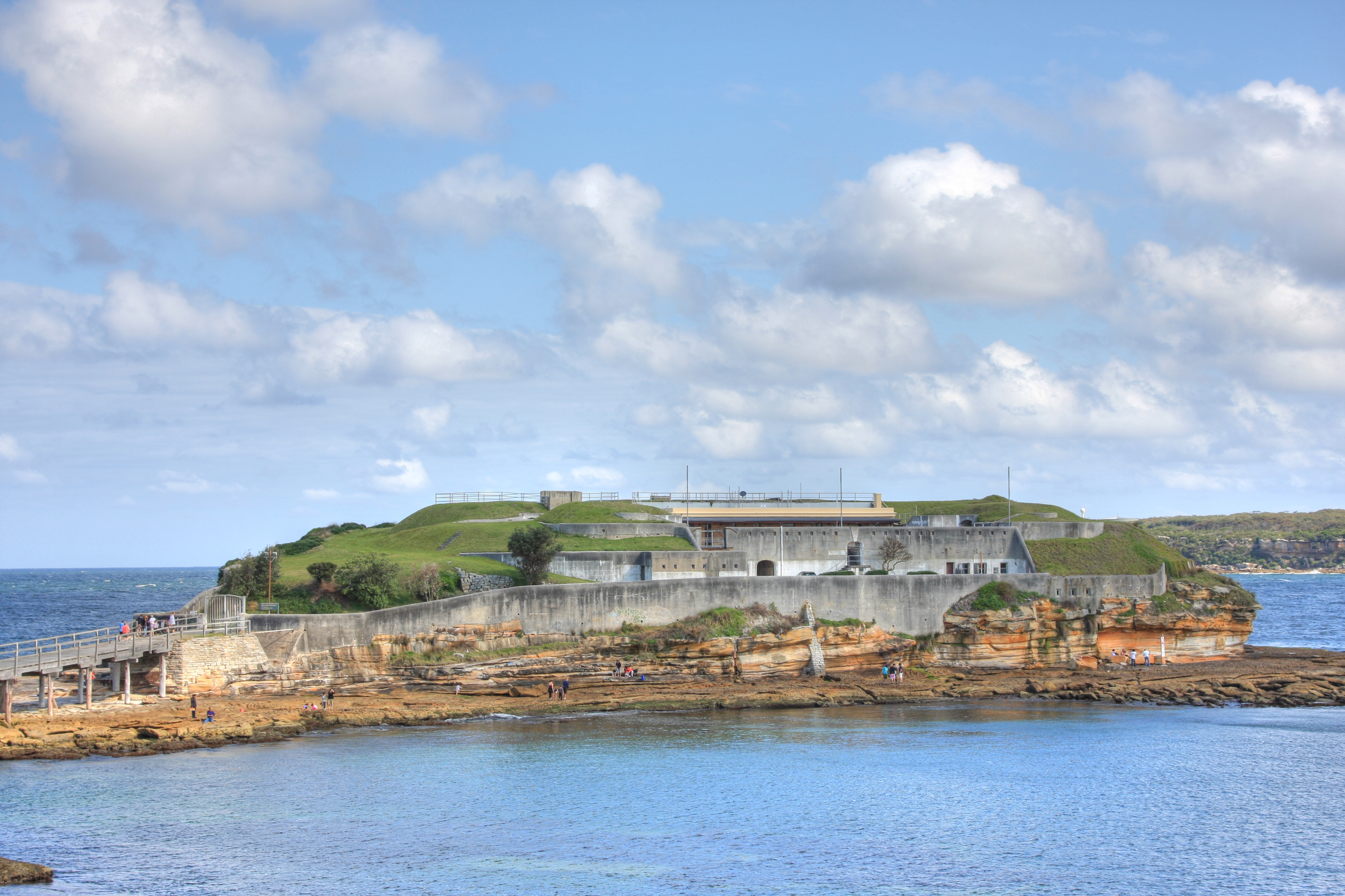
Bare Island Fortification facing south-east.

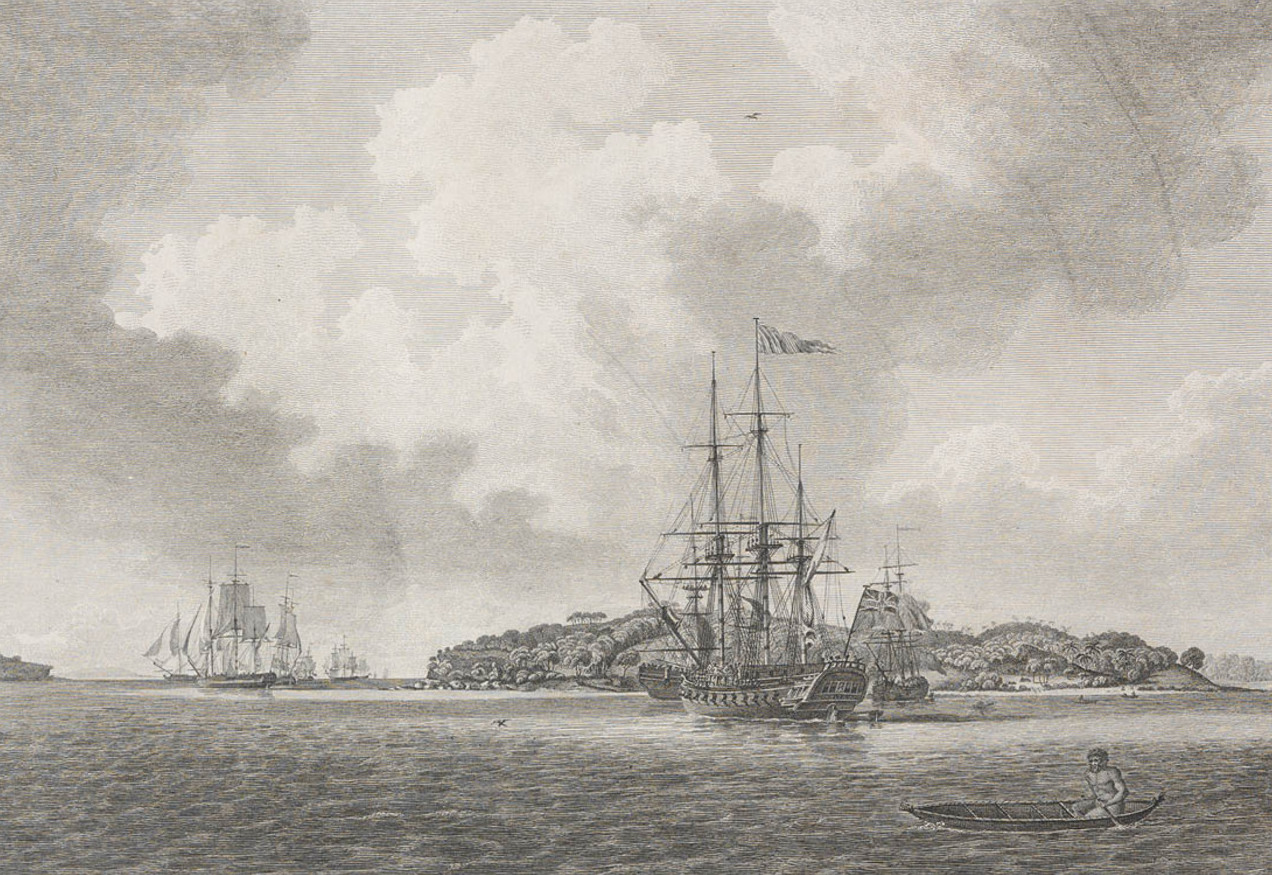
A view of Botany Bay as the First Fleet entered, with Bare Island in the background. The image is from the journal of Arthur Phillip.

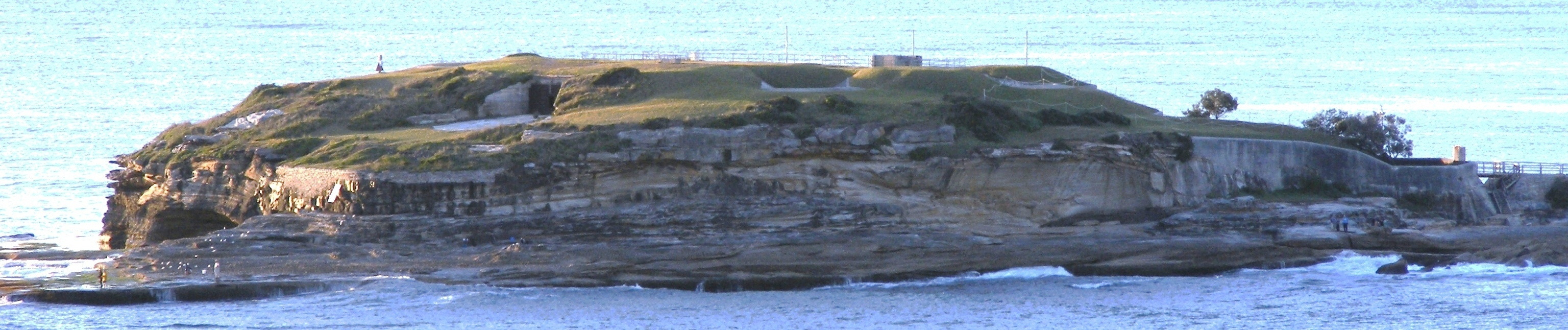
Bare Island from Henry Head

BareIsland Orthomosaic photograph.

== See also ==
- List of islands of New South Wales
- Henry Head Battery
- North Head (New Zealand)
- Military history of Australia
