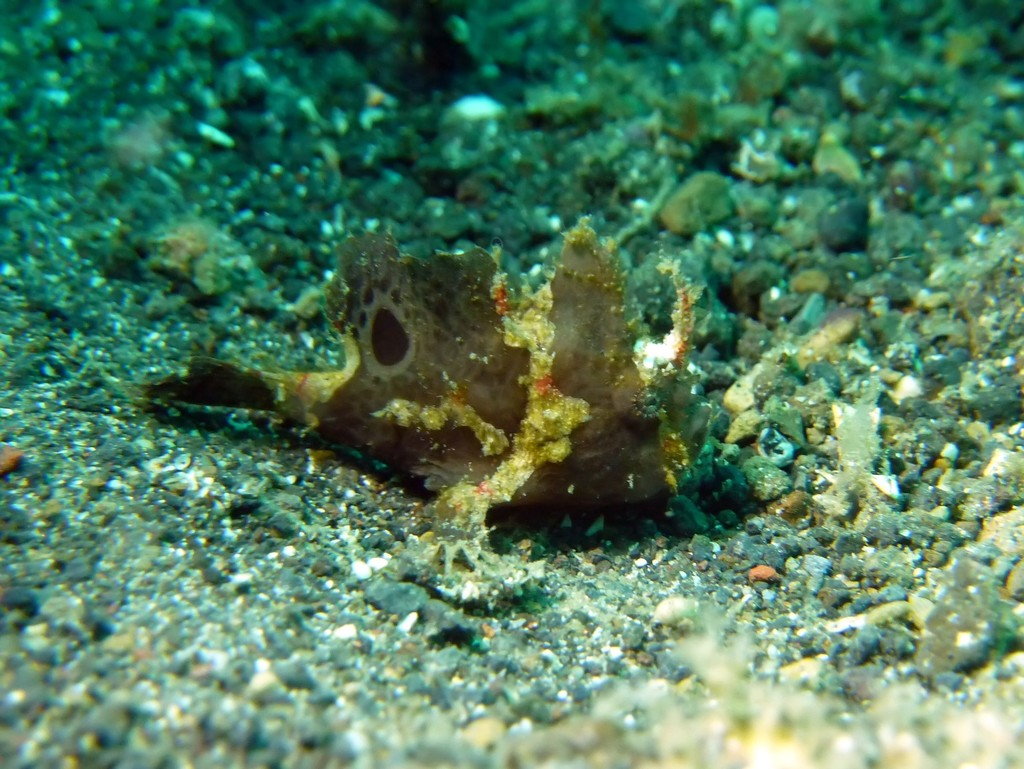
- Deepwater frogfish (Nudiantennarius subteres) Lembeh

Scientific classification
- Kingdom: Animalia
- Phylum: Chordata
- Class: Actinopterygii
- Order: Lophiiformes
- Family: Antennariidae
- Subfamily: Antennariinae
- Genus: Nudiantennarius; L. P. Schultz, 1957
- Species: N. subteres

Binomial name
- Nudiantennarius subteres (H. M. Smith & Radcliffe, 1912)

Synonyms
- Antennarius subteres H. M. Smith & Radcliffe, 1912

= Nudiantennarius =

Species of fish

Nudiantennarius is a monospecific genus of marine ray-finned fish belonging to the family Antennariidae, the frogfishes. The only species in the genus is Nudiantennarius subteres, the deepwater frogfish. This fish is found in the Western Pacific Ocean.

== Taxonomy ==
Nudiantennarius was first proposed as a genus in 1957 by the American ichthyologist Leonard Peter Schultz. Schultz designated Antennarius subteres as the type species of the new genus, as well as being its only species. Anetnnarius subteres has been first formally described in 1912 by Hugh McCormick Smith and Lewis Radcliffe with its type locality given as Lingayen Gulf in western Luzon in the Philippines. An unidentified frogfish from Lembeh was identified as being this species in 2017. Within the family Antennariidae this taxon has been found to be most closely related to the sargassum fish (Histrio histrio). Some authorities classify this genus in the subfamily Antennariinae within the family Antennariidae. However, the 5th edition of Fishes of the World does not recognise subfamilies within the Antennariidae, classifying the family within the suborder Antennarioidei within the order Lophiiformes, the anglerfishes.

== Etymology ==
Nudiantennarius is a combination of the words nudus, meaning "nude" or "naked", with the genus name Antennarius, the type genus of the frogfish family, Antennariidae. This is a references to the seemingly naked skin; members of the species only have a scattering of spinules (small denticles) embedded in the skin on the head and body. The specific name, subteres, prefixes teres, which means "cylindrical" or "tapering", as in the English word terete, with sub, meaning "less than". The authors did not explain what this was referring to but it is thought to be alluding to the shape of the body.

== Description ==
Nudiantennarius is distinguished from other frogfishes by the reduced number of spinules in the skin: the skin has only a partial covering of bifurcate dermal spinules, so few that the body has the appearance of being naked in comparison to other frogfish. The spinules are each no longer than the distance between their tips. The first dorsal spine, or illicium, has a distinct esca, or lure, and is naked without spinules. The illicium is around half the length of the second dorsal spine which is unusually long in comparison to other frogfishes; it is slender and is not connected to the skin of the head by a posterior membrane. The lobe of the pectoral fin is thin and is somewhat separated from the sides. This species has a caudal peduncle and the rear margins of the dorsal and anal fins are clearly attached to the just in front of the outer rays of the caudal fin. The dorsal fin has 12 soft rays while the anal fin has 7. There is typically at least one large ocellus on the base of the dorsal fin. The esca is small and round, has short filaments and fits into a thin groove beside the second dorsal spine. The deepwater frogfish has a maximum published standard length of 7.5 cm (3.0 in).

== Distribution and habitat ==
Nudiantennarius is found in the Western Pacific Ocean in the Philippines and Indonesia, and off Japan, inhabiting depths between 3 and 128 m (9.8 and 419.9 ft). This species is usually encountered on substrates of brown or black sand, silt or mud, where there may be some soft coral or gorgonians and sponges, but with very few hard coral. The deepwater frogfish has also been found on pier pilings and rarely among small patches of seaweed. Other records have come from areas dominated by leaf litter and refuse, particularly in areas near human habitation. Others have been recorded in habitats mainly made up of very coarse sand or fine coral rubble, with a few hard corals and gorgonians. In this habitat there were many small cephalopods, numerous decapods and other crustaceans, and a variety of fishes, largely consisting of juveniles of small species of shark, burrowing snake eels, along with numerous species of scorpionfishes and waspfishes such as Rhinopias eschmeyeri and R. frondosa. At another site this species and the striated frogfish (Antennarius striatus were observed on coarse sand and rubble covered slopes with scatterred encrusting sponges, hydroids and litter covered in organic growth.

== Biology ==
Nudiantennarius is most commonly observed on night dives off Bali. Dark coloured fishes are most numerous on coarse sand or gravel, frequently where there are patches of green algae, at depths between 4 and 20 m (13 and 66 ft) whereas the lighter and more colourful individuals are typically found in association with small sponges, similar in colour to the frogfish, at rather greater depths, between 12 and 30 m (39 and 98 ft). This is an oviparous species.
