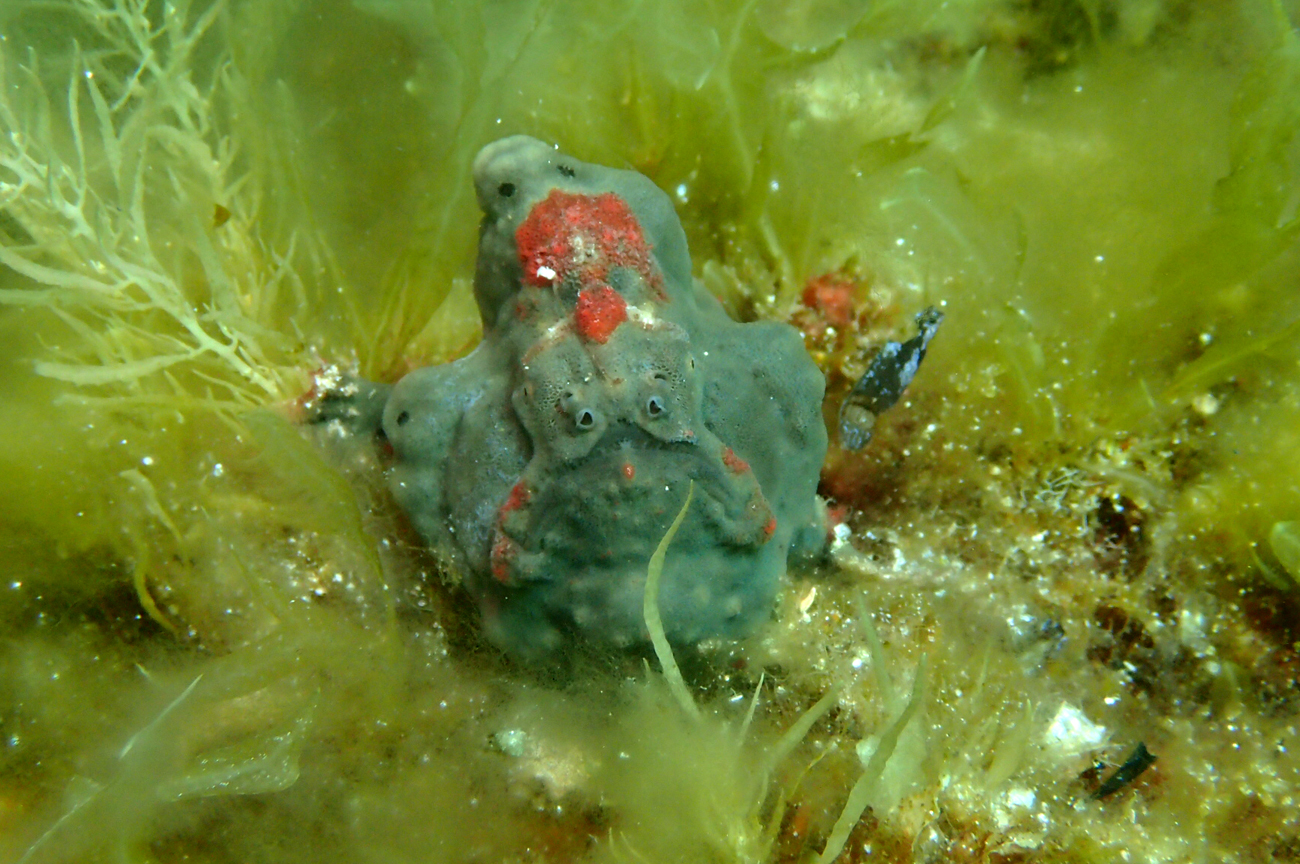

Scientific classification
- Kingdom: Animalia
- Phylum: Chordata
- Class: Actinopterygii
- Order: Lophiiformes
- Family: Antennariidae
- Subfamily: Rhycherinae
- Genus: Allenichthys; Pietsch, 1984
- Species: A. glauerti

Binomial name
- Allenichthys glauerti (Whitley, 1944)

Synonyms
- Echinophryne glauerti Whitley, 1944

= Glauert's anglerfish =

Species of fish

Glauert's anglerfish (Allenichthys glauerti) is species of marine ray-finned fish belonging to the subfamily Histiophryninae in the family Antennariidae, the frogfishes. This species is the only species in the monospecific genus Allenichthys. This species is endemic to southern Australia.

== Taxonomy ==
Glauert's anglerfish was first formally described as Echinophryne glauerti in 1944 by the Australian ichthyologist Gilbert Percy Whitley with its type locality given as Cottesloe Beach in Western Australia. In 1984 Theodore Wells Pietsch III proposed the monotypic genus Allenichthys for E. glauerti. Some authorities classify this genus in the subfamily Histiophryninae within the family Antennariidae., while others recognise it as the family Histiophrynidae. However, the 5th edition of Fishes of the World does not recognise subfamilies within the Antennariidae, classifying the family within the suborder Antennarioidei within the order Lophiiformes, the anglerfishes.

== Etymology ==
Glauert's anglerfish has the genus name Allenichthys which suffixes ichthys, meaning fish, onto Allen, honouring the American-born Australian ichthyologist Gerald R. Allen. The specific name is an eponym but it is uncertain who this honours, it is likely to be the paleontologist Ludwig Glauert, a curator at the Western Australian Museum in Perth, who collected the paratype. It may also refer to B. and U. Glauert, the ladies who collected the holotype.

== Description ==
Glauert's anglerfish has a short deep and rather compressed body that does not have a caudal peduncle. It has a large head with small eyes and a large upwardly directed mouth with many short, recurved teeth. The gill opening is a small hole under and to the rear of the base of the pectoral fin. The first dorsal spine, the illicium, is based on the tip of the snout with a lure, or esca, is an appendage covered in filaments. The second and third dorsal spines are free, not embedded in the skin on the head, the second spine is over the eye and is very short, recurved, thinning towards the tip and is covered with thick skin, although it is not connected to the head by a membrane and is also unconnected to the third spine. The third dorsal spine is located on the nape and is connected rearwards along its full length to the body by a thick membrane. The soft dorsal fin as a long base and contains 15 or 16 soft rays while the anal fin contains 8 soft rays. The rear margins of these fins are connected to the outer rays of the caudal fin. The pectoral fins are limb like. There is a dense covering of bifurcated spinules on the skin. The overall colour is variable and they are marked with scattered drak rings. The background colour varies through light tan, pale yellow, pinkish-brown, yellow-brown to brown. The underside is lighter in colour. The crown and the part of back in front of the soft dorsal-fin is dark-brown and the outer margin of all the fins is dark brown. This species has a maximum published total length of 19 cm (7.5 in).

== Distribution and habitat ==
Glauert's anglerfish is endemic to southern Australia where it is found from the Dampier Archipelago in Western Australia to Kangaroo Island in South Australia. This species is a temperate and demersal fish found in coastal waters on reefs, although it has been recorded from the continental shelf in depths in excess of 145 m (476 ft).

== Biology ==
Glauert's anglerfish is oviparous and has separate sexes with the eggs being fertilised externally. This species is an ambush predator, the illicium and esca are waved around to lure in prey which are then sucked into the large mouth.
