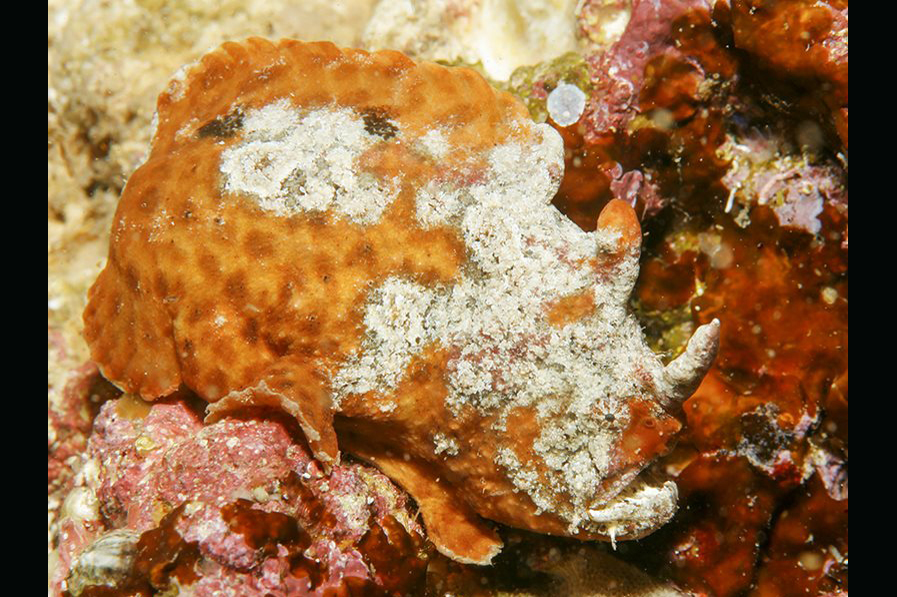
- A Whitespotted Anglerfish, Phyllophryne scortea, at Edithburg, South Australia, December 2006

Scientific classification
- Kingdom: Animalia
- Phylum: Chordata
- Class: Actinopterygii
- Order: Lophiiformes
- Family: Antennariidae
- Subfamily: Rhycherinae
- Genus: Phyllophryne; Pietsch, 1984
- Species: P. scortea

Binomial name
- Phyllophryne scortea (McCulloch & Waite, 1918)

Synonyms
- Histiophryne scortea McCulloch & Waite, 1918; Histiophryne scortea inconstans McCulloch & Waite, 1918

= Phyllophryne =

Species of fish

Phyllophryne is a monospecific genus of marine ray-finned fish belonging to the subfamily Histiophryninae in the family Antennariidae, the frogfishes. The only species in the genus is Phyllophryne scortea, the white-spotted anglerfish, smooth anglerfish or smooth frogfish, which is endemic to southern Australia.

== Taxonomy ==
Phyllophryne was first proposed as a monospecific genus in 1984 by the American ichthyologist Theodore Wells Pietsch III with Histiophryne scortea designated as the type species. H. scortea was first formally described in 1918 by Allan Riverstone McCulloch and Edgar Ravenswood Waite with its type locality given as Stansbury on Gulf St Vincent in South Australia. Some authorities classify this genus in the subfamily Histiophryninae within the family Antennariidae., while others recognise it as the family Histiophrynidae. However, the 5th edition of Fishes of the World does not recognise subfamilies within the Antennariidae, classifying the family within the suborder Antennarioidei within the order Lophiiformes, the anglerfishes.

== Etymology ==
Phyllophryne is a combination of phyllon, which means "leaf", a reference to the many, scattered, cutaneous appendages on head and body which resemble leaves, with phryne, which means "toad", a suffix commonly used in the names of anglerfish genera, dating back to Aristotle and Cicero, who called anglerfishes "fishing frogs" or sea frogs". The specific name scotrea means "leathery" referring to the texture of its skin.

== Description ==
Phyllophryne has the second and third dorsal spines are not hidden underneath the skin. The seven inner rays of the caudal fin are forked while the outer rays are simple. The skin is smooth with no dermal denticles and there is no caudal peduncle. The rear margins of the dorsal and anal fins is not connected to the outer rays of the caudal fin by a membrane. The skin has scattered fleshy appendages. The illicium, the fishing rod, has an oval esca or lure with a number of filaments at its tip. This fish varies in colour from green, yellow, orange, brown to dark grey or black, frequently with whitish mottles or spots. The dorsal fin is supported bybetween 7 and 9 soft rays. 15 or 16 soft rays while the anal fin contains The white-spotted anglerfish has a maximum published total length of 10 cm (3.9 in).

== Distribution and habitat ==
Phyllophryne is endemic to southern Australia. It is distributed from Green Cape, New South Wales and Tasmania west to the Houtman Abrolhos off Western Australia. This is a benthic fish is found in temperate waters at depths down to 44 m (144 ft) on rocky reefs in bays, estuaries and coastal environments, frequently hiding under rocks and among sponges.

== Biology ==
Phyllophryne is camouflaged to match the encrusting algae and sponges in their habitat. It is a carnivorous fish that uses the esca to attract prey to within striking distance of the large mouth. They are oviparous fish and the female lays the eggs onto rocky surfaces. Once laid the fertilised eggs are tended by the male who curls around them so they are protected between his tail and his body.
