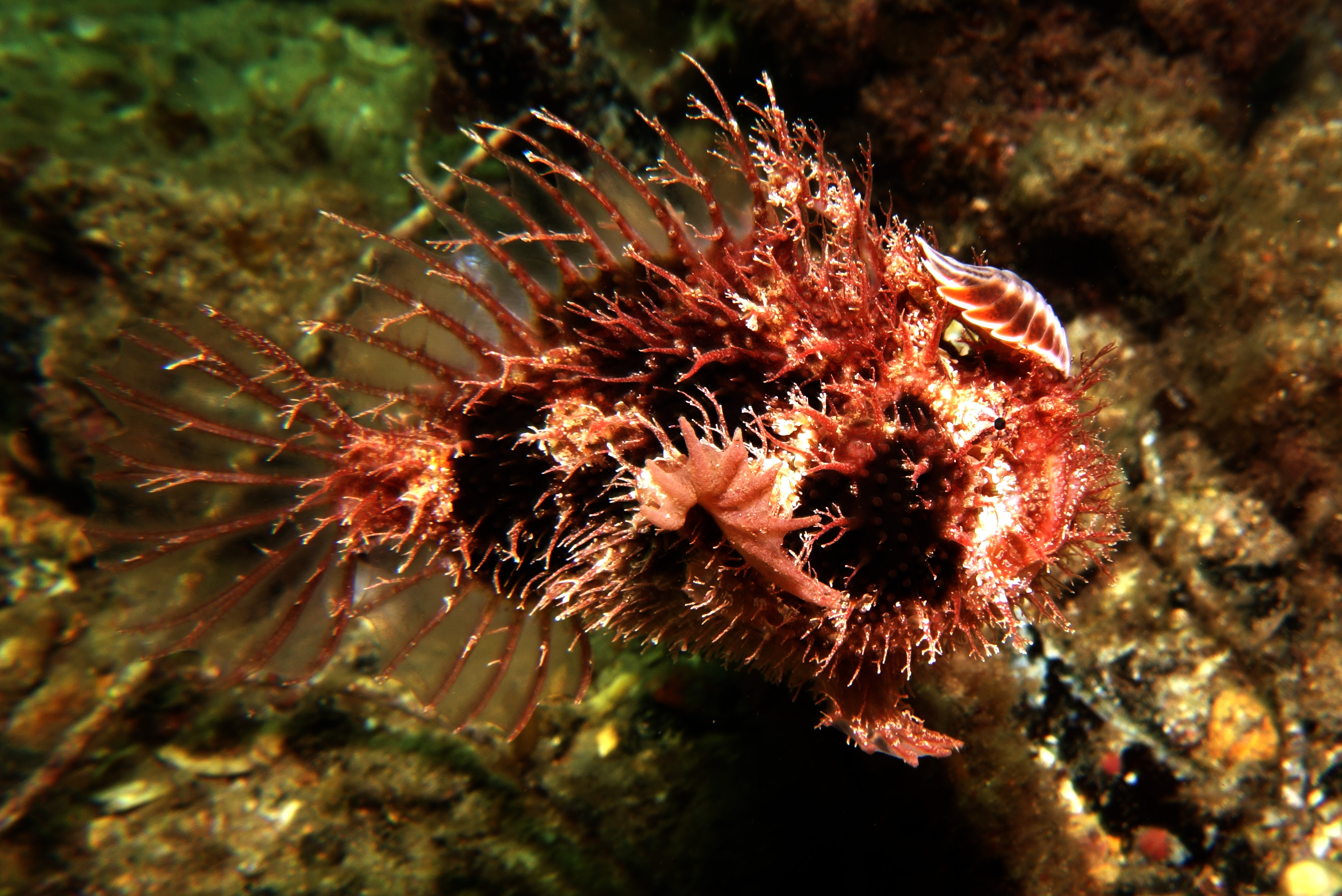
- Tasselled anglerfish (Rhycherus filamentosus)

Scientific classification
- Kingdom: Animalia
- Phylum: Chordata
- Class: Actinopterygii
- Division: Teleostei
- Order: Lophiiformes
- Family: Antennariidae
- Subfamily: Rhycherinae; Hart et al., 2022

Genera
- See text

= Rhycherinae =

Subfamily of frogfish found in the Indo-Pacific region

Rhycherinae, the Balrog frogfishes, is a subfamily of frogfish found in the Indo-Pacific region. Members of this subfamily were previously placed in the subfamily Histiophryninae (formerly treated as the family Histiophrynidae), but a 2022 phylogenetic study found them to form a distinct clade, which was described as the family Rhycheridae. A 2025 phylogenetic study found Antennariidae to be oversplit into multiple families, and thus reclassified the Rhycheridae as the subfamily Rhycherinae. Eschmeyer's Catalog of Fishes presently recognizes the clade as a subfamily.

The common name "Balrog frogfishes" references the red coloration seen on many members of the species, which, when combined with their frequently open mouths, is remiscent of the Balrog of J. R. R. Tolkien's works.

== Taxonomy ==
Rhycherinae contains the following genera:

- Allenichthys Pietsch, 1984
- Echinophryne McCulloch & Waite, 1918
- Kuiterichthys Pietsch, 1984
- Phyllophryne Pietsch, 1984
- Porophryne Arnold, Harcourt & Pietsch, 2014
- Rhycherus Ogilby, 1907

== Characteristics ==
Members of this group are distinguished from the Antennarinae by the loss of the mesopterygoid and epural. However, the major difference is in the ovaries and the reproductive strategies shown by these fishes. They have simple oval shaped ovaries while those of Antennariinae have ovaries which are shaped like a double scroll. They do not undergo metamorphosis and the eggs and young are given some amount of parental care whereas antennariines are broadcast spawners. Generally, they are small fishes, the largest species is Glauert's anglerfish (Allenchthys glauerti) with a maximum published total length of 11 cm (4.3 in).
