= Porophryne =

Scientific classification
- Kingdom: Animalia
- Phylum: Chordata
- Class: Actinopterygii
- Order: Lophiiformes
- Family: Antennariidae
- Subfamily: Rhycherinae
- Genus: Porophryne; R. J. Arnold, R. G. Harcourt & Pietsch, 2014 '
- Species: P. erythrodactylus

Binomial name
- Porophryne erythrodactylus R. J. Arnold, R. G. Harcourt & Pietsch, 2014

Species of fish

Porophryne is a monospecific genus of marine ray-finned fish belonging to the subfamily Histiophryninae in the family Antennariidae, the frogfishes. The only species in the genus is Porophryne erythrodactylus, the red-fingered anglerfish, red-footed frogfish, Bare Island anglerfish or Sydney anglerfish, which is endemism to the waters off New South Wales in eastern Australia. Both the species and the genus were first described in 2014.

== Taxonomy ==
Porophryne was first proposed as a genus in 2014 by Rachel J. Arnold, Robert Geoffrey Harcourt and Theodore Wells Pietsch III when they described the new species P. erythrodactylus, which they also designated as the type species of the new genus. P. erthrodactylus was originally photographed by Harcourt and sent to the Australian Museum for identification but staff at the Museum could not identify it so the image was sent to Pietsch, an expert in anglerfishes, for idenitification. Pietsch suggested that it was not only a new species but a new genus too and requested that a specimen be collected. Harcourt, and two friends, obtained permits to collect specimens from the Department of Primary Industries in New South Wales, finding a single specimen which was sent to be formally described by Arnold, Harcourt and Pietsch. P. eryhthrogaster has its type locality given as New South Wales, Botany Bay, Kurnell. This genus is a sister genus of Kuiterichthys. Some authorities classify this genus in the subfamily Histiophryninae within the family Antennariidae., while others recognise it as the family Histiophrynidae. However, the 5th edition of Fishes of the World does not recognise subfamilies within the Antennariidae, classifying the family within the suborder Antennarioidei within the order Lophiiformes, the anglerfishes.

== Etymology ==
Porophryne combines poro, meaning "having pores", an allusion to the black spots on the head and body of the majority of individuals, these resemble the pores, oscula of the sponges it lives among, with phryne, which means "toad", a suffix commonly used in the names of anglerfish genera, dating back to Aristotle and Cicero, who called anglerfishes "fishing frogs" or sea frogs". The poro part may also refer to the Porifera spones that make uo the primary habitat of this fish. The specific name erythrodactylus means "red fingers" referring to the red colour at the tips of the fin rays of the pectoral fins and some of the other fins.

== Description ==
Porophryne is separated from its sister genus, Kuiterichthys, in the possession of an completely different morphology of the second dorsal spine. In this genus it is slender at its base, suddenly expanded to the sides and becoming almost quadrangular. There is an obvious tuft of filaments, typically brightly in colour, on the midline of the lower lip, this may be an additional lure, a feature not known from any other anglerfish. All 9 fin rays in the caudal fin are forked and there are 13 soft rays on the dorsal fin and 7 in the anal fin. The whole body is covered in dermal denticles, apart from the black spots. The illicium, or first dorsal spine, is equal in length to the second dorsal spine. The large and oval shaped esca, or lure, is tipped by two tufts of short filaments. This fish has two colour phases; one is grey with scattered black spots, lacking denticles, on the head and body; the other may be orange or red or pink or white, or a combination of these colours, without the black spots but with appendages on the skin. The red-fingered anglerfish has a maximum published Standard length of 7.4 cm (2.9 in).

== Distribution and habitat ==
Porophryne is known only from the waters off New South Wales at scattered localities between Sydney Harbour and Jervis Bay, these include Indian Point, Botany Bay at 6 m (20 ft) in depth, Bare Island sponge gardens at 14 m (46 ft), South Head at 10 m (33 ft), one guarding eggs at Bass Point Shellharbour and the Middleground in Jervis Bay at 24 m (79 ft). The red-fingered anglerfish is typically found rocky-reef habitats below the low tide mark, dominated by leafy and filamentous seaweed such as Zonaria, Corallina, Amphiroa, and Laurencia, frequently with an admixture of Sargassum sppand Ecklonia radiata. The vertical or sloping walls on the deeper edges of nearby reefs are inhabited by ascidians, corals and sponges, these include Spongia sp., Tedania anhelans, Ephydatia fluviatilis, Darwinella australiensis, Chondrilla australiensis, Mycale australis and Holopsamma laminaefavosa. It has its closest association with small sponges. The fish achieves camouflage by looking like the algae-covered sponges found in its rocky, subtidal habitat.

== Biology ==
Porophryne is oviparous and the eggs are guarded after laying, similar to other temperate starfingered anglerfishes.
