= Butler's frogfish =

Scientific classification
- Kingdom: Animalia
- Phylum: Chordata
- Class: Actinopterygii
- Division: Teleostei
- Order: Lophiiformes
- Family: Antennariidae
- Subfamily: Tathicarpinae; Hart et al., 2022
- Genus: Tathicarpus; J. D. Ogilby, 1907
- Species: T. butleri

Binomial name
- Tathicarpus butleri J. D. Ogilby, 1907

Synonyms
- Tathicarpus appeli J. D. Ogilby, 1922; Tathicarpus muscosus J. D. Ogilby, 1907

Species of fish

Butler's frogfish, Butler's anglerfish or the blackspot anglerfish (Tathicarpus butleri), is a rare species of marine ray-finned fish, the only member of the subfamily Tathicarpinae of the family Antennariidae, the frogfishes. The only member of its genus, this species is the most derived member of its family and represents a separate lineage from all other frogfishes. It was previously thought to be the only member of the family Tathicarpidae, this name being proposed by Pamela B. Hart et al in 2022, but this lineage is now treated as a subfamily of the Antennariidae. It is found off the southern coast of New Guinea, and along the coasts of Western Australia to 33° S latitude, the Northern Territory, and Queensland to 22° S latitude. A benthic species, it inhabits inshore tropical waters and coral reefs to a maximum depth of 145 m (480 ft), though most are found shallower than 45 m (150 ft). Its specific epithet honours its discoverer Dr. A. Graham Butler.

This species reaches a maximum length of 10 cm (3.9 in). It has a stout, laterally compressed body with a large head longer than deep. Like other anglerfishes, the first dorsal fin ray is modified into a lure for attracting prey. The illicium ("fishing rod") of the Butler's frogfish is very long, measuring 24-47% the standard length, and lacks dermal spines. At the tip is a distinct esca ("fishing lure") that may measure 22% the standard length, consisting of a thin, broad appendage covered with hair-like filaments and bearing 1-2 dark spots at the base. The mouth is protrusible, with many slender, sharp teeth on the jaws, vomer, and palatines. The dorsal and anal fins are tall, containing 10-11 and 7 fin rays respectively; the caudal fin is long and contains 9 rays.

The Butler's frogfish has unusually long and "arm-like" pectoral fin lobes, which unlike other frogfish are largely detached from the sides of the body. Its genus name Tathicarpus, meaning "extending wrist", refers to this trait. The fish uses these pectoral fins to clamber along the sea bottom. The number of pectoral fin rays is reduced (6-7 as opposed to 8 or more in other frogfish), and the Butler's frogfish can move each ray individually like "fingers" to steady itself or to hold on to objects. The pelvic fins contain 5 rays each and are placed beneath the body. The skin is densely covered with bifurcate spinules; there are also varying numbers of large, fringed filaments over the head and body. The coloration ranges from pale gray to greenish to brown, with darker markings. The fin membranes are thin and translucent.
