= Lophichthys =

Scientific classification
- Kingdom: Animalia
- Phylum: Chordata
- Class: Actinopterygii
- Order: Lophiiformes
- Family: Antennariidae
- Subfamily: Lophichthyinae; Boeseman, 1964
- Genus: Lophichthys; Boeseman, 1964
- Species: L. boschmai

Binomial name
- Lophichthys boschmai Boeseman, 1964

Genus of fishes

Lophichthys boschmai, also known as Arafura frogfish or Boschma's frogfish, is a species of anglerfishes closely related to frogfish. L. boschmai is the only species in the Lophichthyidae family. L. boschmai were first reported by Marinus Boseman in 1964 to the Rijksmuseum van Natuurlijke Historie, now known as National Museum of Natural History in Leiden. The species was named after Dutch zoologist, Hildbrand Boschma.

Like the true frogfishes, it is a small fish, no more than 5 cm (2.0 in) in length, with loose skin and a lure (esca) for attracting prey. The pectoral fins are prehensile, helping the fish move along the sea bed. Unlike true frogfishes, however, it does not have an enlarged and globose head. It lives in shallow waters off the coast of New Guinea.

== Range ==
L. boschmai are restricted to the western central pacific and are found in the Arafura Sea near Merauke, and Indonesia. They are also found in Western New Guinea and Papua New Guinea. Similar fishes in the same area as the L. boschmai are the Lophiidae, Antennariidae, Tetrabrachiidae, Chaunacidae, and Ogcocephalidae.

L. boschmai are bottom dwellers. They are a benthic species found on the continental shelf. They live in soft bottom habitats. Not a lot is known about L. boschmai, but like other benthic anglerfish, there are presumed to be carnivorous, waiting quietly for smaller fish to pass by so that they can bait them into their mouths.

== Features ==
L. boschmai have a maximum size of 5.1 centimetres (2.0 in). Their body and head is covered with small spines and skinny flaps. The body is elongated and the head is slightly depressed, without a median groove. The mouth is large, with 1 or 2 rows of small, recurved teeth. The eyes are small and positioned dorsolateral. The Lophinchythys gills are restricted to a small pore located at the end of a short tube, above the pectoral fin base. The pectoral fin itself is a single elongated and leg like fin. The spinous dorsal has three separate spines widely separated from each other and the soft part of the dorsal fin. The skin is white on the belly and light pink on the lateral and dorsal surfaces of head and body. The skin is slightly darker brown on the upper part of the body. The fins are dark brown with white spots. The oral cavity and viscera are unpigmented. Like Frogfish, L. boschmai might use their coloring as camouflage to hide from predators and prey. Also like frogfish, who use a gas bladder to control their buoyancy, L. boschmai have an inflatable abdomen.
