= Hilbrand Boschma =

Dutch zoologist

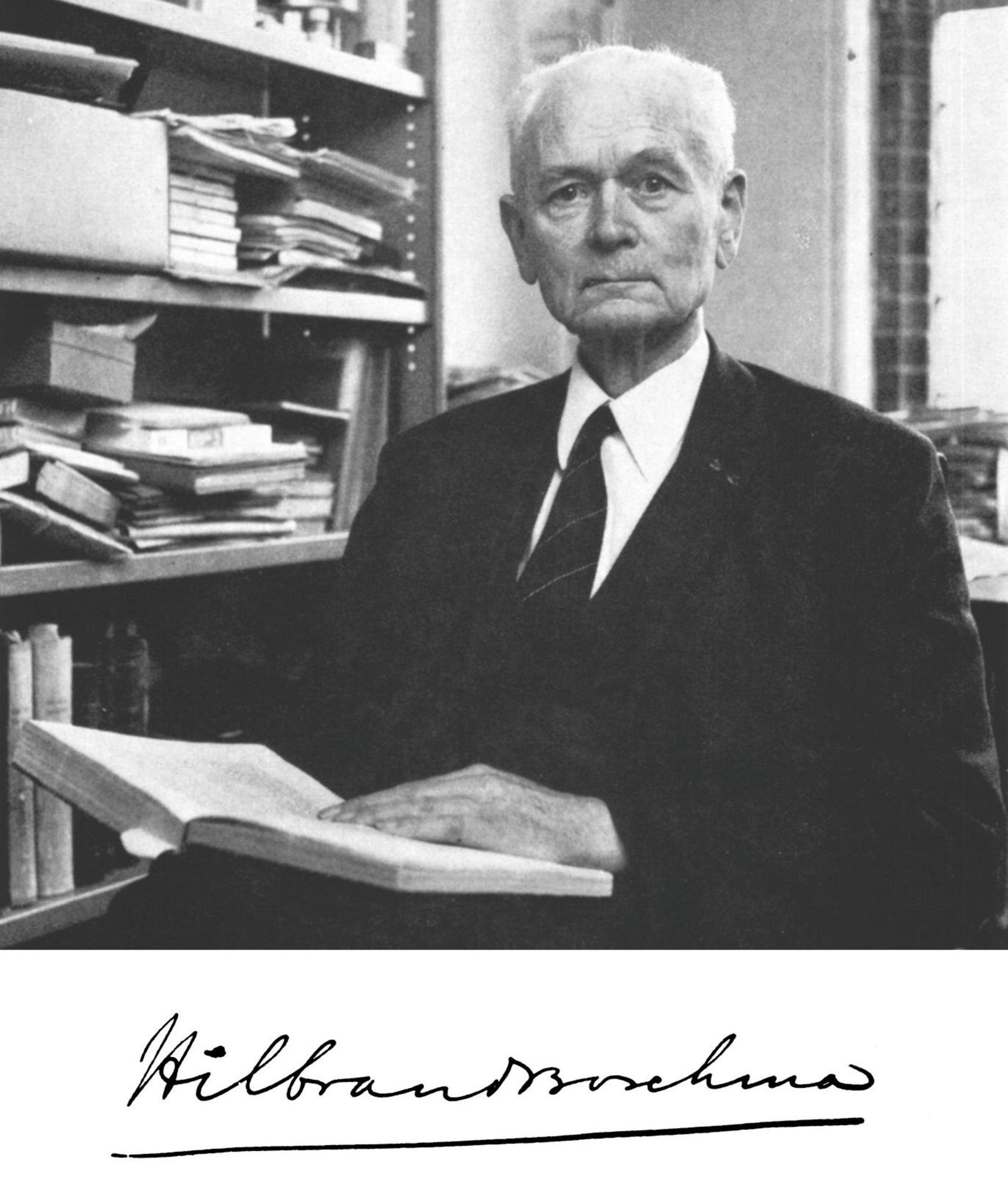
- Born: 22 April 1893; Ysbrechtum, Netherlands
- Died: 22 July 1976 (aged 83); Leiden, Netherlands
- Education: University of Amsterdam

Hilbrand Boschma (22 April 1893 – 22 July 1976) was a Dutch zoologist and director of the Rijksmuseum of Natural History in Leiden.

Boschma studied botany and zoology at the University of Amsterdam. He went to the former Dutch East Indies, where he studied embryology, functional morphology in reptiles and amphibians, and stony corals. He joined a Danish expedition to the Kai Islands in 1922 as an associate of the Danish zoologist Dr. Th. Mortensen and sampled and studied corals. He is taxon author of (among other invertebrate organisms) several different species of fire corals.

Thereafter Boschma went back to The Netherlands to take up the post of chief assistant at the Zoological Laboratory of the State University at Leiden. In 1925 he started giving lectures in general zoology for medical students, and in 1931 he became professor of general zoology.

In 1934 Boschma became director of the Rijksmuseum of Natural History in Leiden. He was the first director who was specialized in invertebrate animals. He was also a Member of the Royal Netherlands Academy of Arts and Sciences since 1946, Foreign Fellow of the Zoological Society of London, Honorary Foreign Member of the Société zoologique de France, and member of the International Commission on Zoological Nomenclature.

He retired at age 65 in 1958, but continued giving lectures until 1963 and writing scientific articles until 1974.

Boschma is commemorated in the scientific names of two species of reptile (Cryptophis boschmai and Draco boschmai), a lobster (Metanephrops boschmai), and a fish (Lophichthys boschmai).
