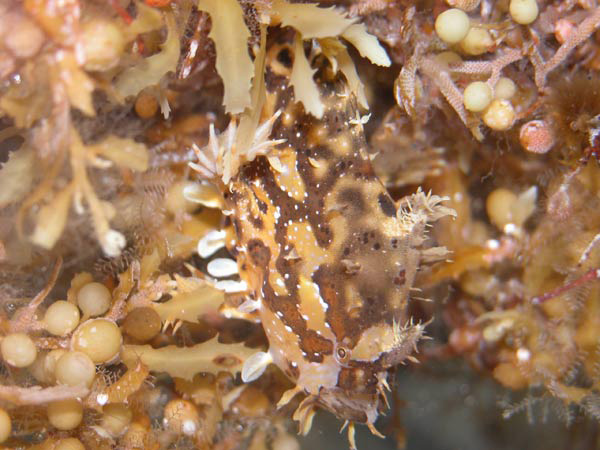
- A sargassumfish in sargassum. The fish's eyes are visible in the bottom center of the image

Conservation status
- Least Concern (IUCN 3.1)

Scientific classification
- Kingdom: Animalia
- Phylum: Chordata
- Class: Actinopterygii
- Division: Teleostei
- Order: Lophiiformes
- Family: Antennariidae
- Subfamily: Antennariinae
- Genus: Histrio; G. Fischer, 1813
- Species: H. histrio

Binomial name
- Histrio histrio (Linnaeus, 1758)

Synonyms
- Genus List: Batrachopus Goldfuss, 1820; Capellaria Gistel, 1848; Chironectes Rafinesque, 1814; Pterophryne Gill, 1863; Pterophrynoides Gill, 1878; Species List: Lophius histrio Linnaeus, 1758; Antennarius histrio (Linnaeus, 1758); Chironectes histrio (Linnaeus, 1758); Pterophryne histrio (Linnaeus, 1758); Pterophrynoides histrio (Linnaeus, 1758); Lophius tumidus Osbeck, 1765; Chironectes tumidus (Osbeck, 1765); Pterophryne tumida (Osbeck, 1765); Lophius histrio marmoratus Bloch & Schneider, 1801; Lophius laevis Latreille, 1804; Lophius raninus Tilesius, 1809; Antennarius raninus (Tilesius, 1809); Cheironectes raninus (Tilesius, 1809); Histrio raninus (Tilesius, 1809); Pterophryne ranina (Tilesius, 1809); Lophius cocinsinensis Shaw, 1812; Chironectes variegatus Rafinesque, 1814; Pterophryne variegatus (Rafinesque, 1814); Lophius gibbus Mitchill, 1815; Antennarius gibbus (Mitchill, 1815); Chironectes gibbus (Mitchill, 1815); Histrio gibbus (Mitchill, 1815); Pterophryne gibba (Mitchill, 1815); Pterophrynoides gibbus (Mitchill, 1815); Chironectes laevigatus Cuvier, 1817; Antennarius laevigatus (Cuvier, 1817); Lophius laevigatus (Cuvier, 1817); Pterophryne laevigata (Cuvier, 1817); Pterophryne laevigatus (Cuvier, 1817); Lophius calico Mitchill, 1818; Lophius geographicus Quoy & Gaimard, 1825; Antennarius nitidus Bennett, 1827; Chironectes nesogallicus Valenciennes, 1837; Antennarius nesogallicus (Valenciennes, 1837); Chironectes pictus Valenciennes, 1837; Histrio pictus (Valenciennes, 1837); Pterophryne picta (Valenciennes, 1837); Cheironectes pictus vittatus Richardson, 1844; Chironectes arcticus Düben & Koren, 1846; Chironectes barbatulus Eydoux & Souleyet, 1850; Antennarius barbatulus (Eydoux & Souleyet, 1850); Antennarius lioderma Bleeker, 1864; Chironectes sonntagii Müller, 1864; Antennarius inops Poey, 1881; Histrio jagua Nichols, 1920; Lophius pelagicus Banks, 1962

= Sargassum fish =

Species of fish

The sargassum fish, anglerfish, or frog fish (Histrio histrio) is a species of marine ray-finned fish belonging to the family Antennariidae, the frogfishes, the only species in the genus Histrio. It lives among Sargassum seaweed which floats in subtropical oceans. The scientific name comes from the Latin histrio meaning a stage player or actor and refers to the fish's feeding behaviour.

== Taxonomy ==
The sargassum fish was first formally described in 1758 by Carl Linnaeus in the 10th edition of Systema Naturae with its type locality given as the Sargasso Sea. In 1813 Johann Gotthelf Fischer von Waldheim proposed a new genus, Histrio, with the Sargassum fish being the type species by tautonymy. The sargassum fish is, with the family Antennariidae, most closely related to the deepwater frogfish (Nudiantennarius subteres). Some authorities classify this genus in the subfamily Antennariinae within the family Antennariidae. However, the 5th edition of Fishes of the World does not recognise subfamilies within the Antennariidae, classifying the family within the suborder Antennarioidei within the order Lophiiformes, the anglerfishes.

== Etymology ==
The sargassum fish has a tautonymous binomial, i.e. both the genus name and the specific name are the same. Histrio means "harlequin", an allusion Linnaeus did not explain but he may have been alluding to its gaudy appearance, the head body and fins being marked with streaks, spots and lines in varied colours and pattern and its having appendages on the skin.

== Description ==
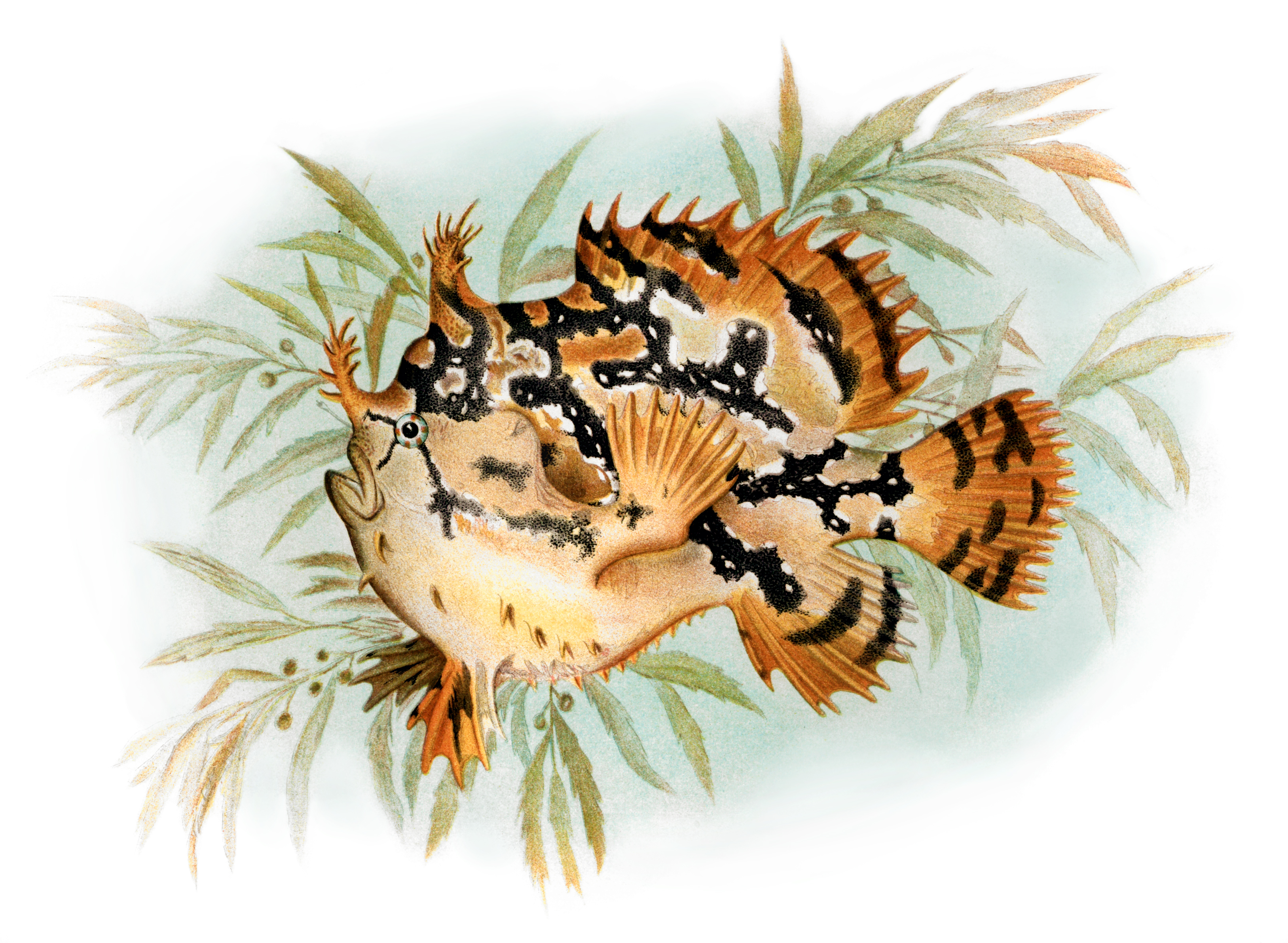
Illustration of a sargassum fish

Histrio histrio, a strange-looking fish, blends well with its surroundings in its seaweed habitat. It is laterally compressed and its length can reach 20 cm (7.9 in). The colour of the body and the large oral cavity is very variable but is usually mottled and spotted yellow, green, and brown on a paler background, and the fins often have several dark streaks or bands. The fish can change colour rapidly, from light to dark and back again. The body and the fins are covered with many weed-like protrusions, but other than these, the skin is smooth without dermal spines. The dorsal fin has three spines and 11–13 soft rays. The front spine is modified into a slender growth on the upper lip known as an illicium, which is tipped by a fleshy lump, the esca. The junction between the head and body is indistinct because no gill slits are present; the gills open as pores near the base of the pectoral fins. The anal fin has no spines and seven to 13 soft rays. The pelvic fins are large and the pectoral fins have 9–11 rays and are stalked and able to grip objects. The outer rays of the tail fin are simple, but the central rays are forked.

== Distribution and habitat ==
The sargassum fish has a cosmopolitan distribution in tropical and subtropical seas down to a depth of around 10 m (30 ft). It is found in parts of the Atlantic Ocean and the Indo-Pacific Ocean, where drifting seaweed accumulates. In the western Atlantic, it ranges from the Gulf of Maine south to Uruguay. It has been reported from northern Norway, but that sighting is likely to be as a result of its having been carried along by the North Atlantic Current. In the Indian Ocean it is found from the Western Cape east through the Mascarenes to India and Sri Lanka and then into the Western Pacific Ocean as far east as the Mariana Islands, south to as far as Perth in Western Australia and New Zealand and north to Hokkaido.

== Biology ==
The sargassum fish is a voracious ambush predator that is also a cannibal. One individual was dissected and found to have 16 juveniles in its stomach. It stalks its prey among the tangled weeds, relying on its cryptic camouflage for concealment. It can clamber through and cling to the seaweed stalks with its prehensile pectoral fins. It dangles its esca as a fishing lure to attract small fish, shrimp, and other invertebrates. It is able to dart forward to grab its prey by expelling water forcibly through its gill openings. It can expand its mouth to many times its original size in a fraction of a second, drawing prey in via suction, and can swallow prey larger than itself.

It is dioecious. At breeding time, the male courts the female by following her around closely. When ready to spawn, the female ascends rapidly to the surface, where she lays a mass of eggs stuck together by gelatinous mucus. This egg raft adheres to the seaweed, where it is fertilised by the male. On hatching, each larva is surrounded by an integumentary envelope and has a large, rounded head, fully formed fins, and eyes with double notches. As the larva develops into a juvenile, this envelope fuses with the skin.

This fish is preyed on by larger fish and sea birds. To avoid underwater threats, it can leap above the surface onto mats of weed. It can survive for some time out of water.
