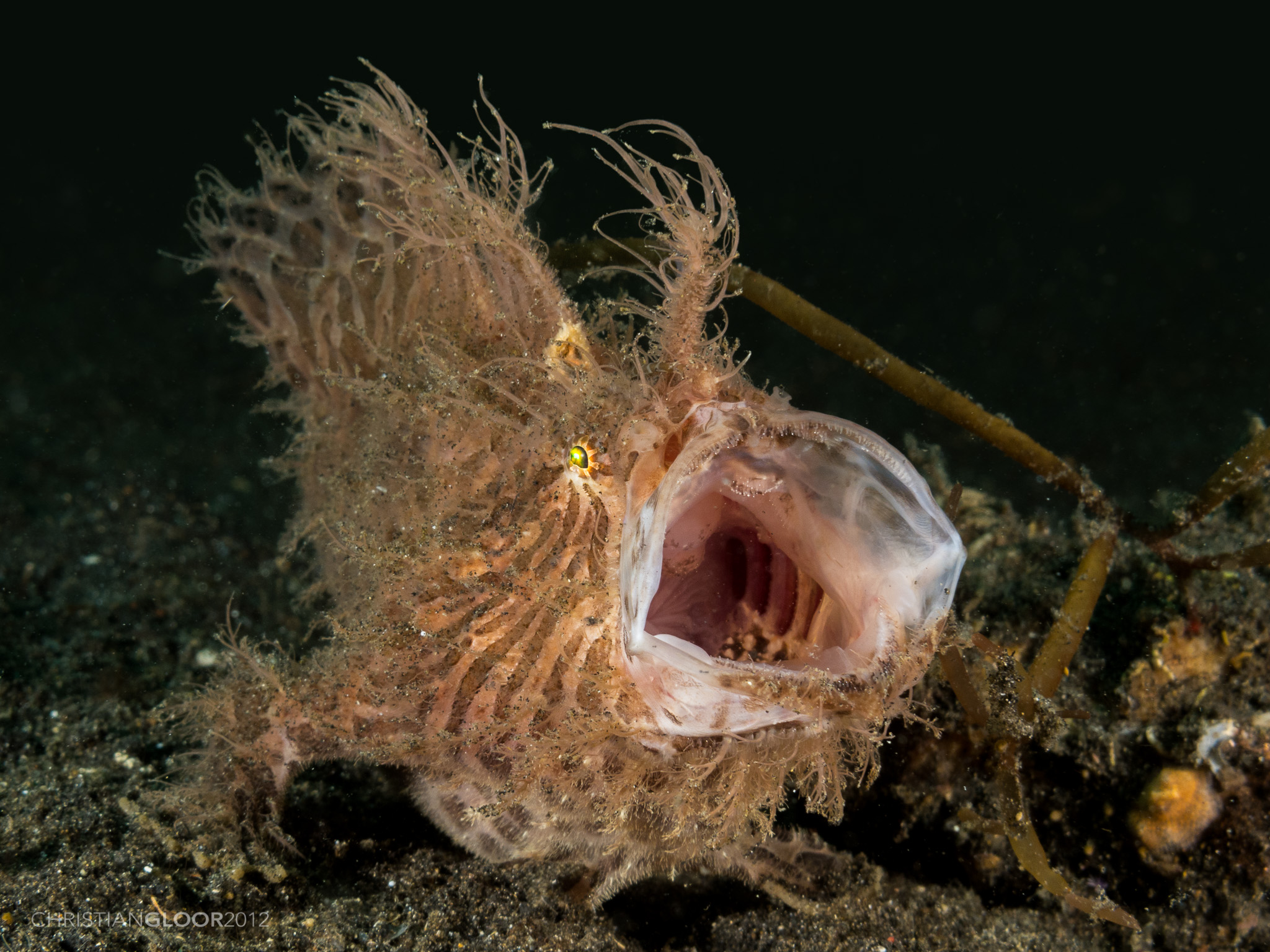
- Striated frogfish, Antennarius striatus

Scientific classification
- Kingdom: Animalia
- Phylum: Chordata
- Class: Actinopterygii
- Order: Lophiiformes
- Suborder: Antennarioidei
- Family: Antennariidae; Jarocki, 1822

Genera
- see text

= Frogfish =

Frogfish Temporal range: Early Eocene to present

Family of fishes

Frogfishes are any member of the anglerfish family Antennariidae, of the order Lophiiformes. Antennariids are known as anglerfish in Australia, where the term "frogfish" refers to members of the unrelated family Batrachoididae. Frogfishes are found in almost all tropical and subtropical oceans and seas around the world, the primary exception being the Mediterranean Sea.

Frogfishes are small, short and stocky, and sometimes covered in spinules and other appendages to aid in camouflage. The camouflage aids in protection from predators and enables them to lure prey. Many species can change colour; some are covered with other organisms, such as algae or hydrozoa. In keeping with this camouflage, frogfishes typically move slowly, lying in wait for prey, and then striking extremely rapidly, in as little as 6 milliseconds.

Few traces of frogfishes remain in the fossil record, though Fowlerichthys monodi is known from the Miocene of Algeria, and a number of species are known from the Eocene of Italy.

== Etymology ==
The frogfish family, Antennariidae, has its name derived from Antennarius, its type genus. Antennarius suffixes -ius to antenna, an allusion to first dorsal spine being adapted into a tentacle on the snout used as a lure to attract prey.

== Taxonomy ==
Antennariidae was first proposed as a family in 1822 by the Polish zoologist Feliks Paweł Jarocki. The 5th edition of the Fishes of the World recognises 13 genera within the family but no subfamilies. Other authorities recognise two subfamilies, the Antennariinae and the Histiophryninae, while others treat these as two separate families. The Antennariidae is classified within the suborder Antennarioidei within the order Lophiiformes, the anglerfishes. The Antennariidae is regarded, with its sister taxon, the Tetrabrachiidae as the most derived clade within the suborder Antennarioidei.

=== Genera ===
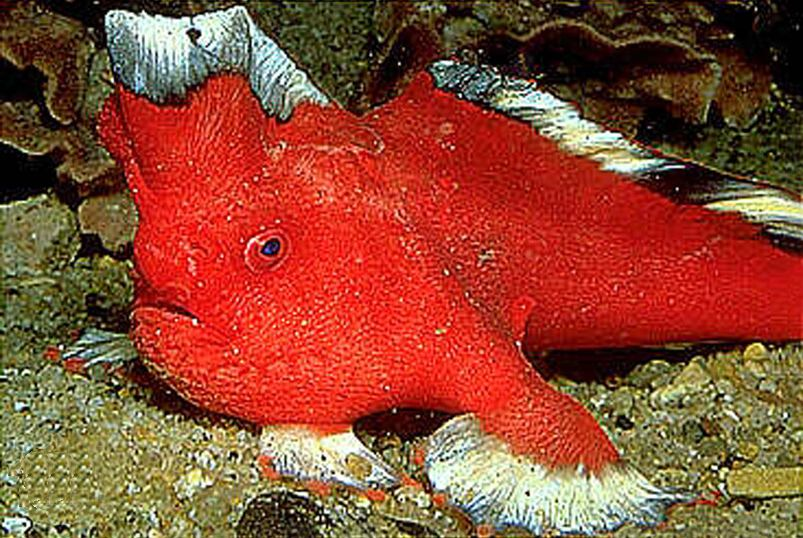
Red handfish (Thymichthys politus)

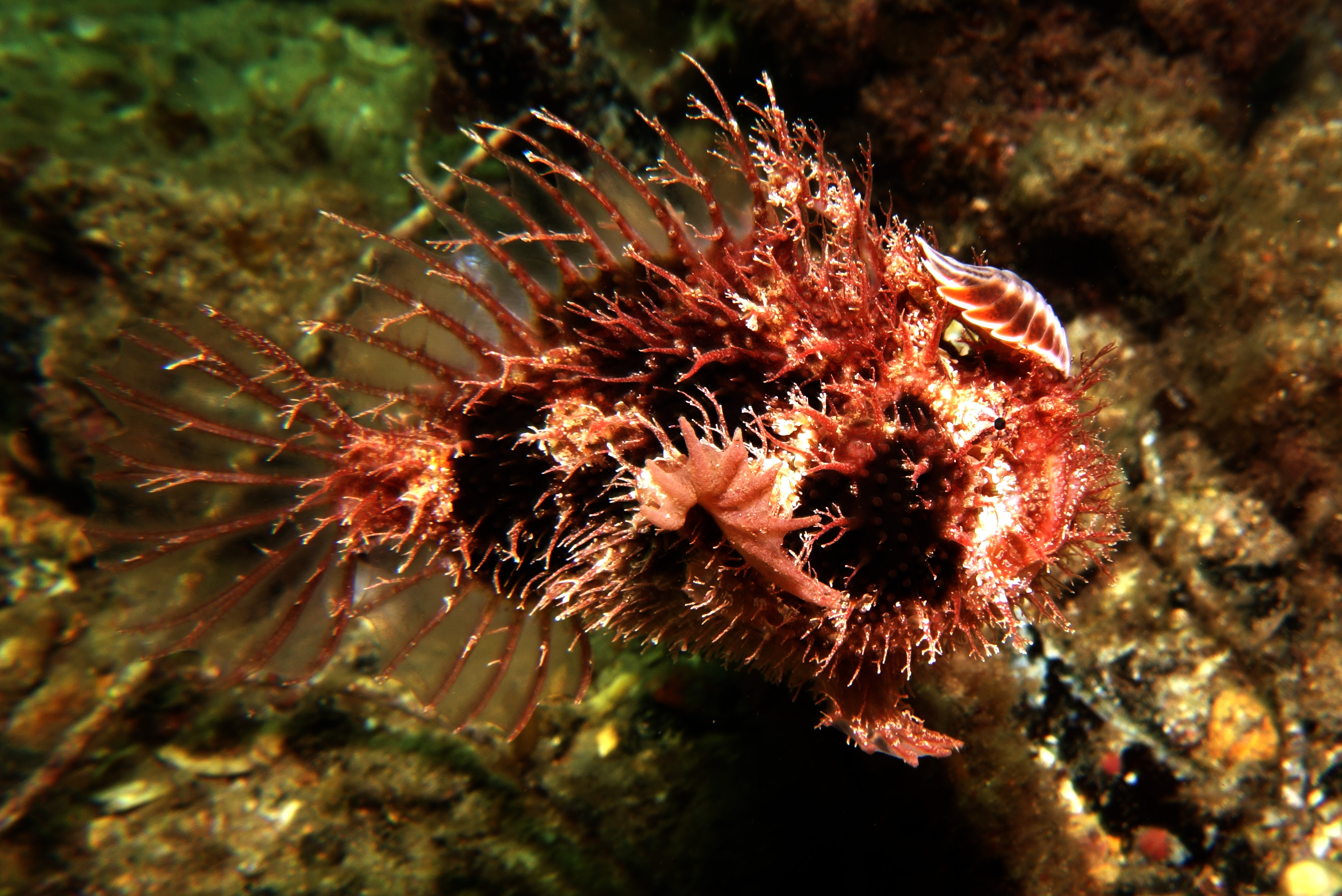
Rhycherus filamentosus

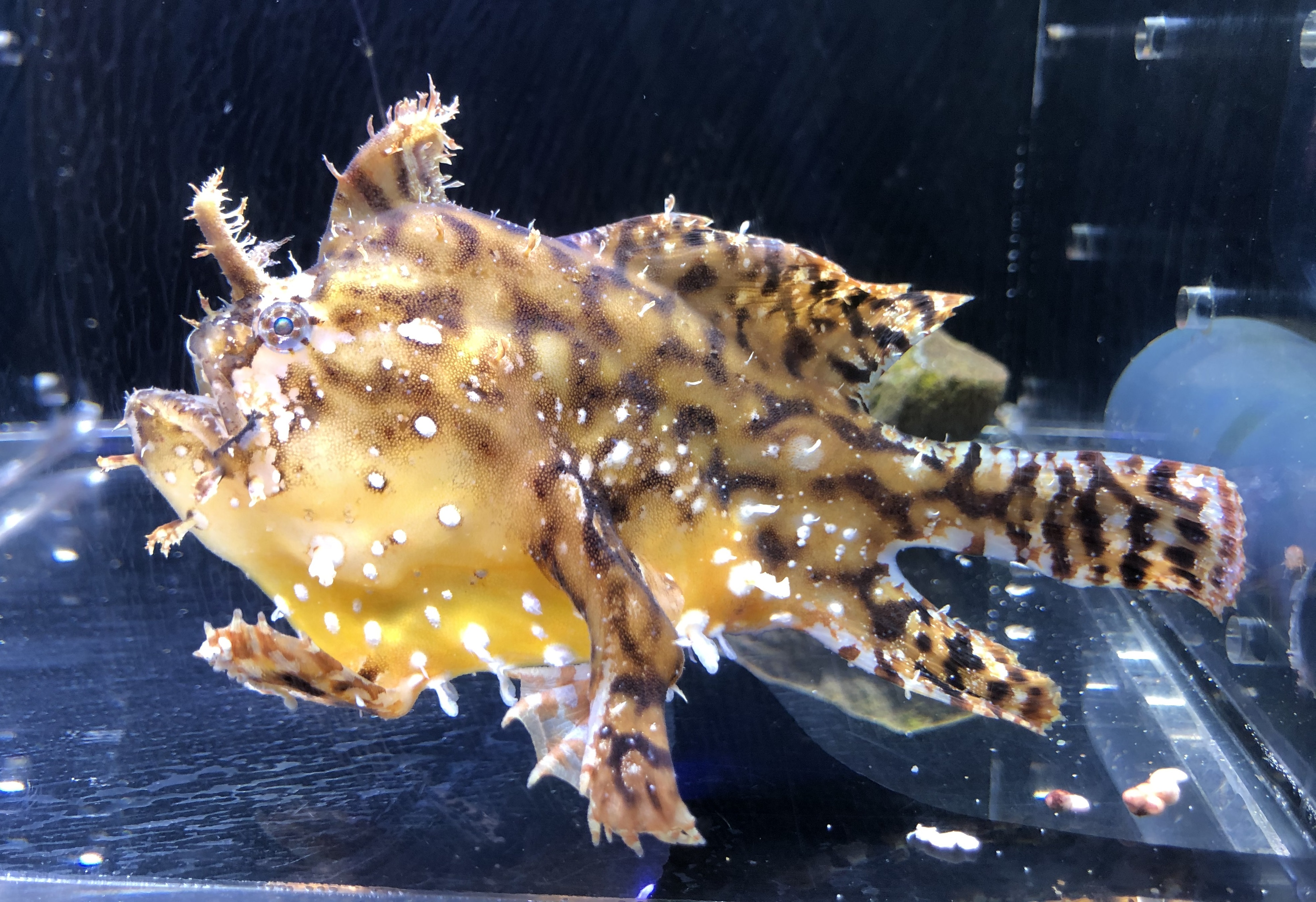
Sargassumfish (Histrio histrio)

The following classification is based on Eschmeyer's Catalog of Fishes, based on Maile et al. (2025):

Subfamily Antennariinae Jarocki 1822 (Fibonacci frogfishes)

- Abantennarius Schultz, 1957
- Antennarius Daudin, 1816
- Antennatus Schultz, 1957
- †Eophryne Carnevale & Pietsch, 2009 (Early Eocene of Italy)
- Histrio Fischer, 1813
- Nudiantennarius Schultz, 1957

Subfamily Brachionichthyinae Gill, 1863 (handfishes)

- Brachionichthys Bleeker, 1854
- Brachiopsilus Last & Gledhill, 2009
- †Histionotophorus Eastman, 1904 (Early Eocene of Italy)
- †Orrichthys Carnevale & Pietsch, 2010 (Early Eocene of Italy)
- Pezichthys Last & Gledhill, 2009
- Sympterichthys Gill, 1878
- Thymichthys Last & Gledhill, 2009

Subfamily Fowlerichthyinae Maile et al., 2025 (fanfin frogfishes)

- Fowlerichthys Barbour, 1941
- †Neilpeartia Carnevale et al., 2020

Subfamily Histiophryninae Arnold & Pietsch, 2012 (starfingered frogfishes)

- Histiophryne Gill, 1863

Subfamily Lophichthyinae Boeseman, 1964 (lophichthyin frogfishes)

- Lophichthys Boeseman, 1964
- Lophiocharon Whitley, 1933

Subfamily Rhycherinae Hart et al., 2022 (Balrog frogfishes)

- Allenichthys Pietsch, 1984
- Echinophryne McCulloch & Waite, 1918
- Kuiterichthys Pietsch, 1984
- Phyllophryne Pietsch, 1984
- Porophryne Arnold, Harcourt & Pietsch, 2014
- Rhycherus Ogilby, 1907

Subfamily Tathicarpinae Hart et al., 2022 (longfin frogfishes)

- Tathicarpus Ogilby, 1907

Subfamily Tetrabrachiinae Regan, 1912 (tetrabrachiin frogfishes)

- Dibrachichthys Pietsch, J. W. Johnson & Arnold, 2009
- Tetrabrachium Günther, 1880

† = Extinct

The division of the family into multiple subfamilies is a recent treatment, as previously the Brachionichthyinae, the Lophichthyinae, and the Tetrabrachiinae were treated as their own families. Histiophrynidae was described as its own family in 2012. In 2022, these four families were found to be paraphyletic with respect to the former treatment of Antennariidae, and due to this, Rhycherinae and Tathicarpinae (both previously placed in Antennariidae) were uplifted to their own families. A 2025 phylogenetic study combining Ultra-Conserved Elements (UCE)s, mitochondrial DNA, and morphological data found even this treatment to be paraphyletic, with Fowlerichthyinae being recognized as a distinct clade. However, to avoid taxonomic oversplitting, it was described as a distinct subfamily instead, and the Brachionichthyidae, Histiophrynidae, Lophichthyidae, Rhycheridae, Tathicarpidae, and Tetrabrachiidae were downgraded to subfamilies within the Antennariidae. The frogfishes were also treated as a single family under an interpretive classification of the Actinopterygii in 2024.

The most basal member of the family is thought to be the Fowlerichthyinae.

=== Fossil record ===
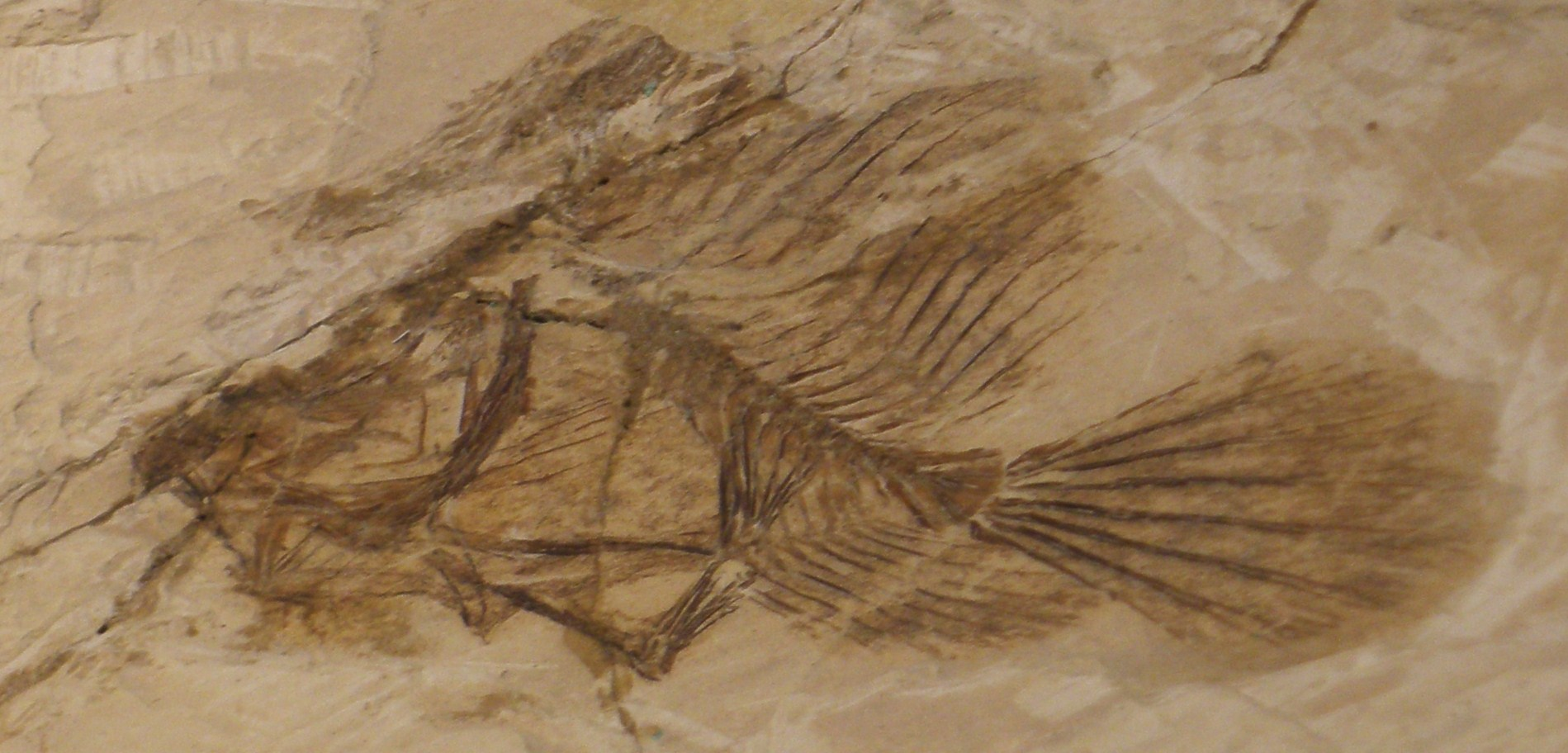
Fossil of Histionotophorus

Very few fossil remains of frogfishes have been found. The oldest known fossil evidence of frogfishes are isolated otoliths, named Antennarius euglyphus Stinton, 1966 from the Early Eocene-aged London Clay Formation of England. The highest diversity has been found in the northern Italian formation at Monte Bolca, formed from the sedimentation of the Tethys Ocean in the early Eocene (50-49 million years ago), which contains two handfish (Histionotophorus and Orrichthys), a Fibonacci frogfish (Eophryne), and a fanfin frogfish related to Fowlerichthys (Neilpeartia). Another fossil is known from Late Miocene Algeria (7 to 5 million years ago), Fowlerichthys monodi, believed to be most closely related to the extant Senegalese frogfish.

== Range ==
Frogfishes live in the tropical and subtropical regions of the Atlantic and Pacific, as well as in the Indian Ocean and the Red Sea. Their habitat lies for the most part between the 20 °C isotherms, in areas where the surface level water usually has a temperature of 20 °C (68 °F) or more. They extend beyond the 20 °C isotherms in the area of the Azores, Madeira and the Canary Islands, along the Atlantic coast of the United States, on the south coast of Australia and the northern tip of New Zealand, coastal Japan, around Durban, South Africa, and at Baja California, Mexico. The greatest diversity of species is in the Indo-Pacific region, with the highest concentration around Indonesia. In the small Lembeh Strait, north-east of Sulawesi, divers have found 9 different species. Frogfish live generally on the ocean floor around coral or rock reefs, at most to 100 m (330 ft) deep.

A few exceptions to these general limits are known. The brackishwater frogfish is at home in ocean waters as well as brackish and fresh water around river mouths. The sargassum fish lives in clumps of drifting sargassum, which often floats into the deeper ocean and has been known to take the sargassum fish as far north as Norway.

== Description ==
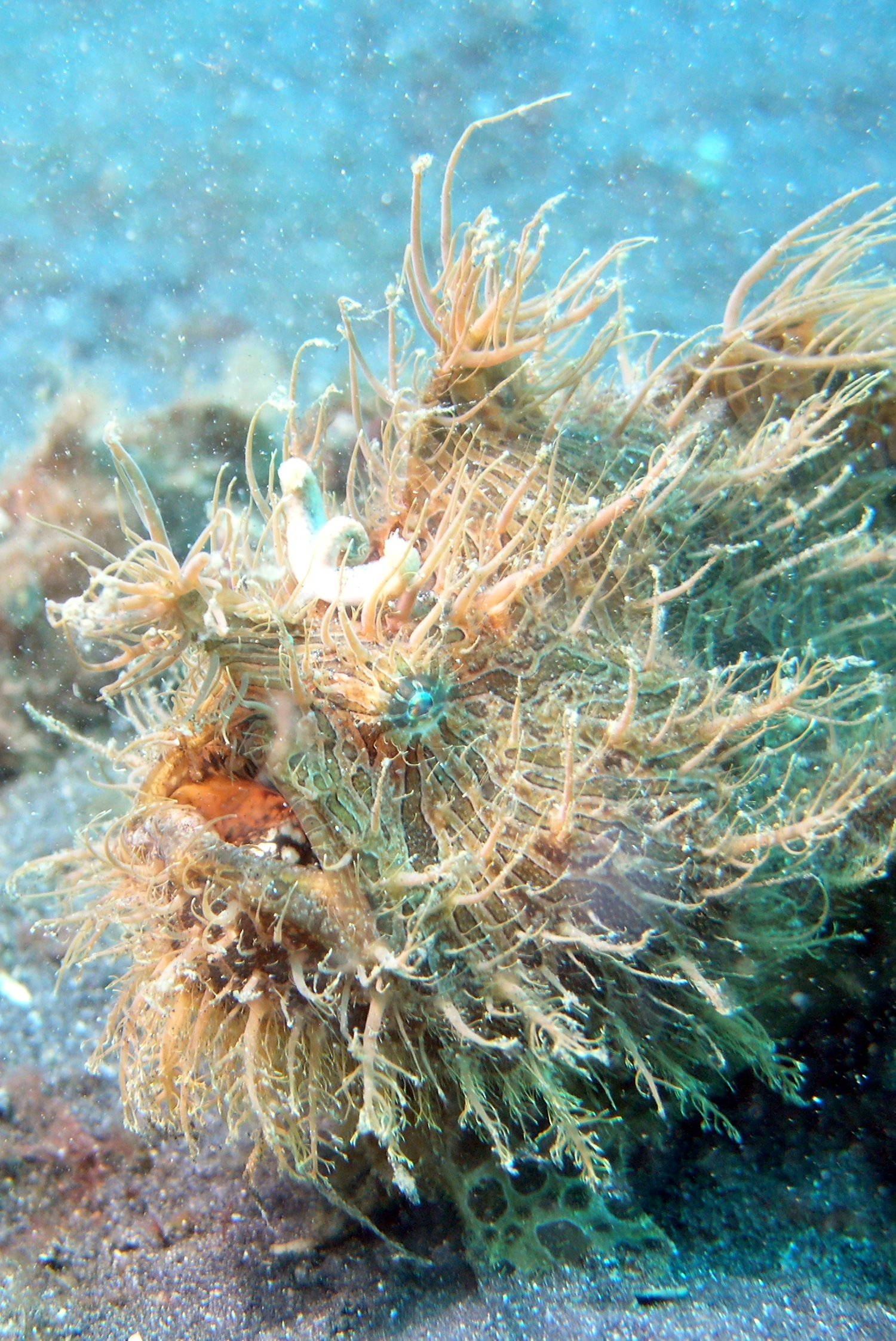
A striated frogfish, with upturned mouth, very distinct spinules, and esca in the form of a white worm

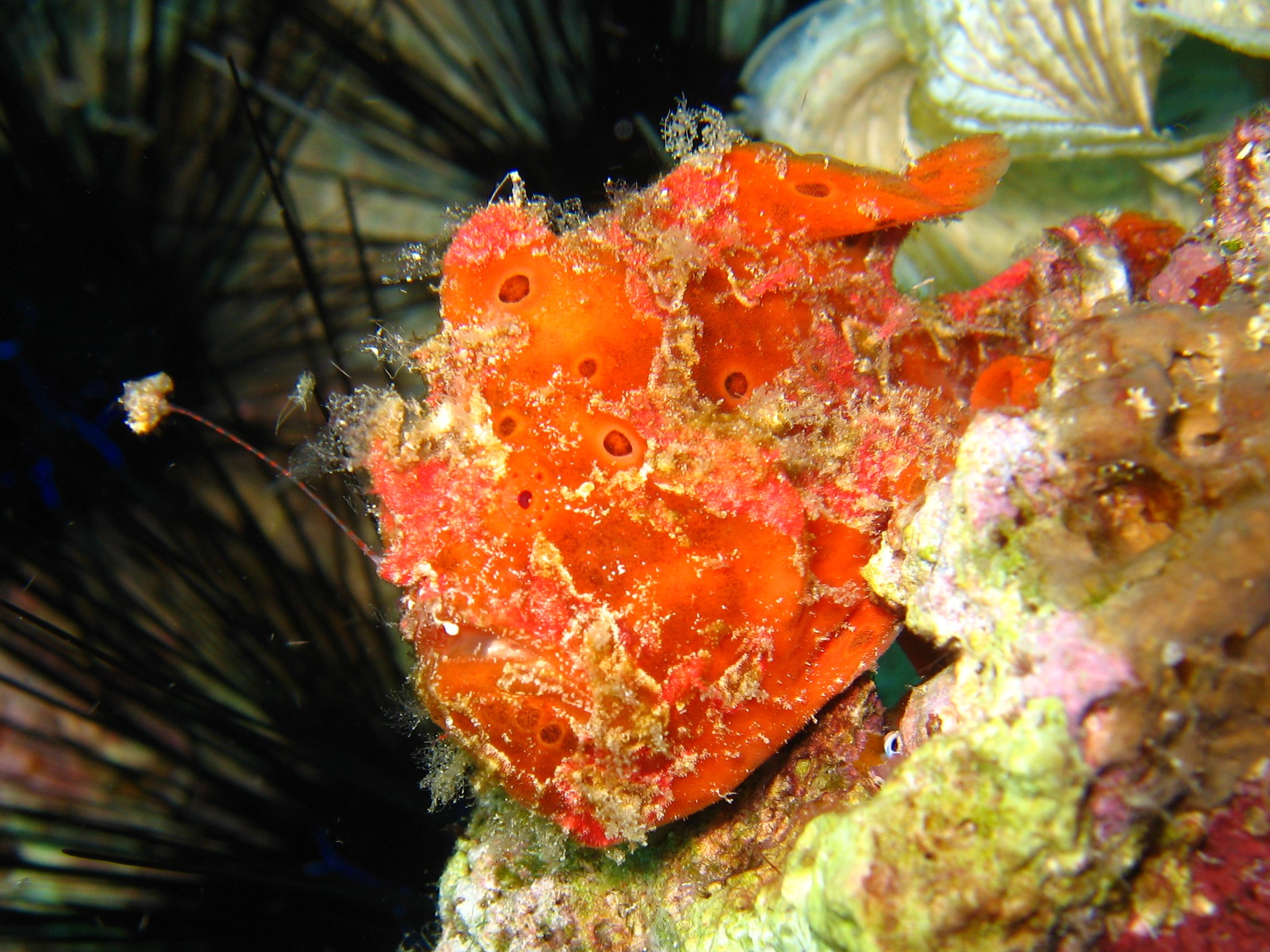
A frogfish in Mactan, Philippines

Frogfishes have a stocky appearance, atypical of fish. Ranging from 2.5–38 cm (0.98–14.96 in) long, their plump, high-backed, unstreamlined body is scaleless and bare, often covered with bumpy, bifurcated spinules. Their short bodies have between 18 and 23 vertebrae and their mouths are upward-pointed with palatal teeth. They are often brightly coloured, white, yellow, red, green, or black or spotted in several colours to blend in with their coral surroundings. Coloration can also vary within one species, making it difficult to differentiate between them.

Antennarioidei fishes are characterised by the first dorsal fin being made up of three separate spines on the head, the first being the illicium with the second sometimes being short, although this spine is not ever embedded within the skin. The pterygiophores of the first dorsal spine and the third dorsal spine have highly compressed dorsal expansions. The interhyal has a central backwards directed process that touches the preoperculum.

Rather than typical dorsal fins, the front-most of the three fins is called the illicium or "rod" and is topped with the esca or "lure". The illicium often has striped markings, while the esca takes a different form in each species. Because of the variety of colours even within a single species, the esca and illicium are useful tools to differentiate among different varieties. Some of them resemble fish, some shrimp, some polychaetes, some tubeworms, and some simply a formless lump; one genus, Echinophryne, has no esca at all. Despite very specific mimicry in the esca, examinations of stomach contents do not reveal any specialized predation patterns—‌for example, only worm-eating fish consumed by frogfishes with worm-mimicking esca. If lost, the esca can be regenerated. In many species, the illicium and esca can be withdrawn into a depression between the second and third dorsal fins for protection when they are not needed.

Frogfish have small, round gill openings behind their pectoral fins. With the exception of Butler's frogfish and the rough anglerfish, frogfish use a gas bladder to control their buoyancy.

=== Mimicry and camouflage ===
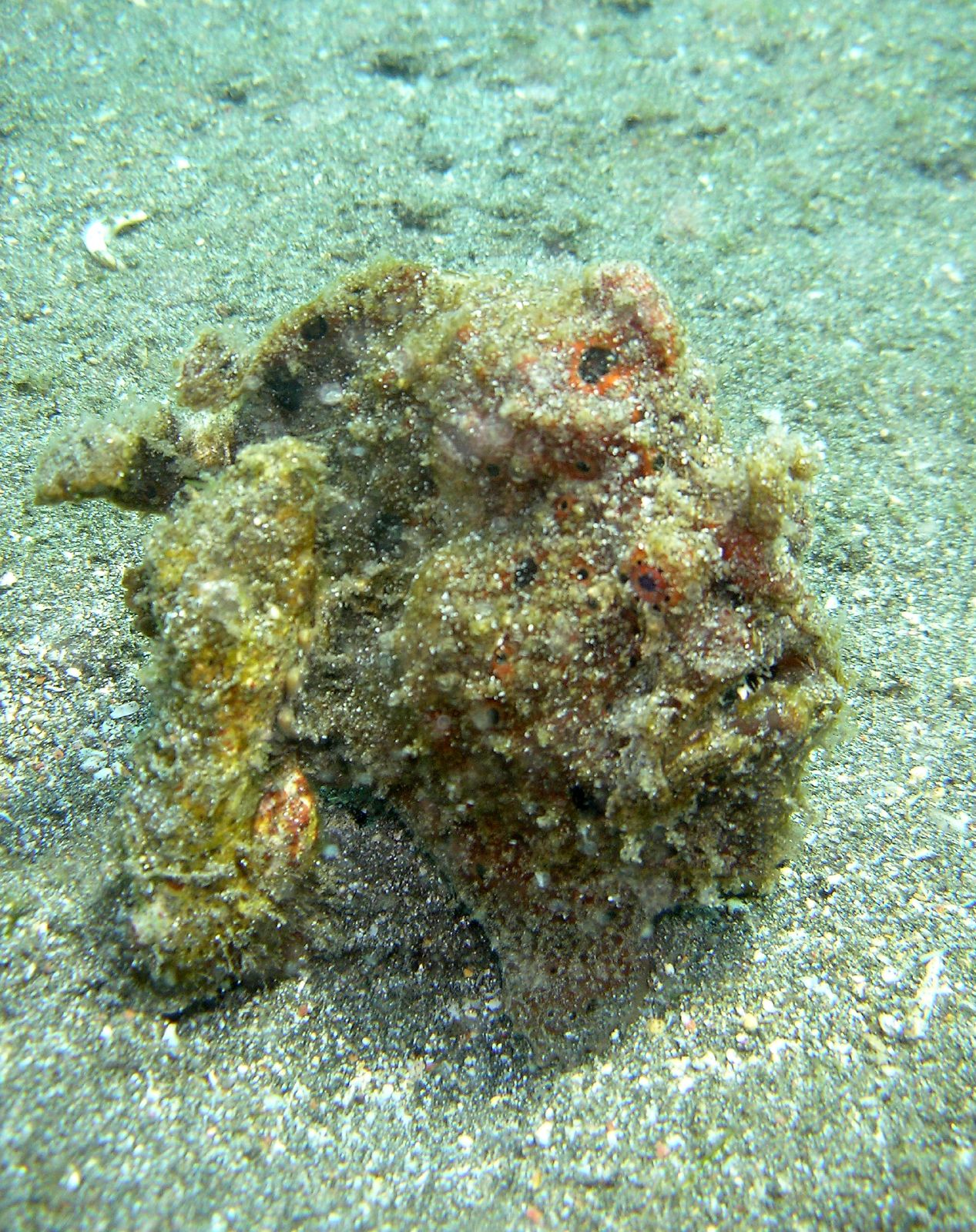
A frogfish disguised as an algae-covered stone

The unusual appearance of the frogfish functions to conceal it from predators and sometimes to mimic a potential meal to lure it in. In the study of animal behavior, this is known as aggressive mimicry. Their unusual shape, colour, and skin textures disguise frogfish. Some resemble stones or coral, while others imitate sponges or sea squirts with dark splotches instead of holes. In 2005, a species was discovered, the striated frogfish, that mimics a sea urchin, while the sargassumfish is coloured to blend in with the surrounding sargassum. Some frogfish are covered with algae or hydrozoa. Their camouflage can be so perfect that sea slugs have been known to crawl over the fish without recognizing them.

For the scaleless and unprotected frogfish, camouflage is an important defense against predators. Some species can also inflate themselves, like pufferfish, by sucking in water in a threat display. In aquaria and in nature, frogfish have been observed, when flushed from their hiding spots and clearly visible, to be attacked by clownfish, damselfish, and wrasses, and in aquaria, to be killed.

Many frogfishes can change their colour. The light colours are generally yellows or yellow-browns, while the darker are green, black, or dark red. They usually appear with the lighter color, but the change can last from a few days to several weeks. What triggers the change is unknown.

=== Movement ===
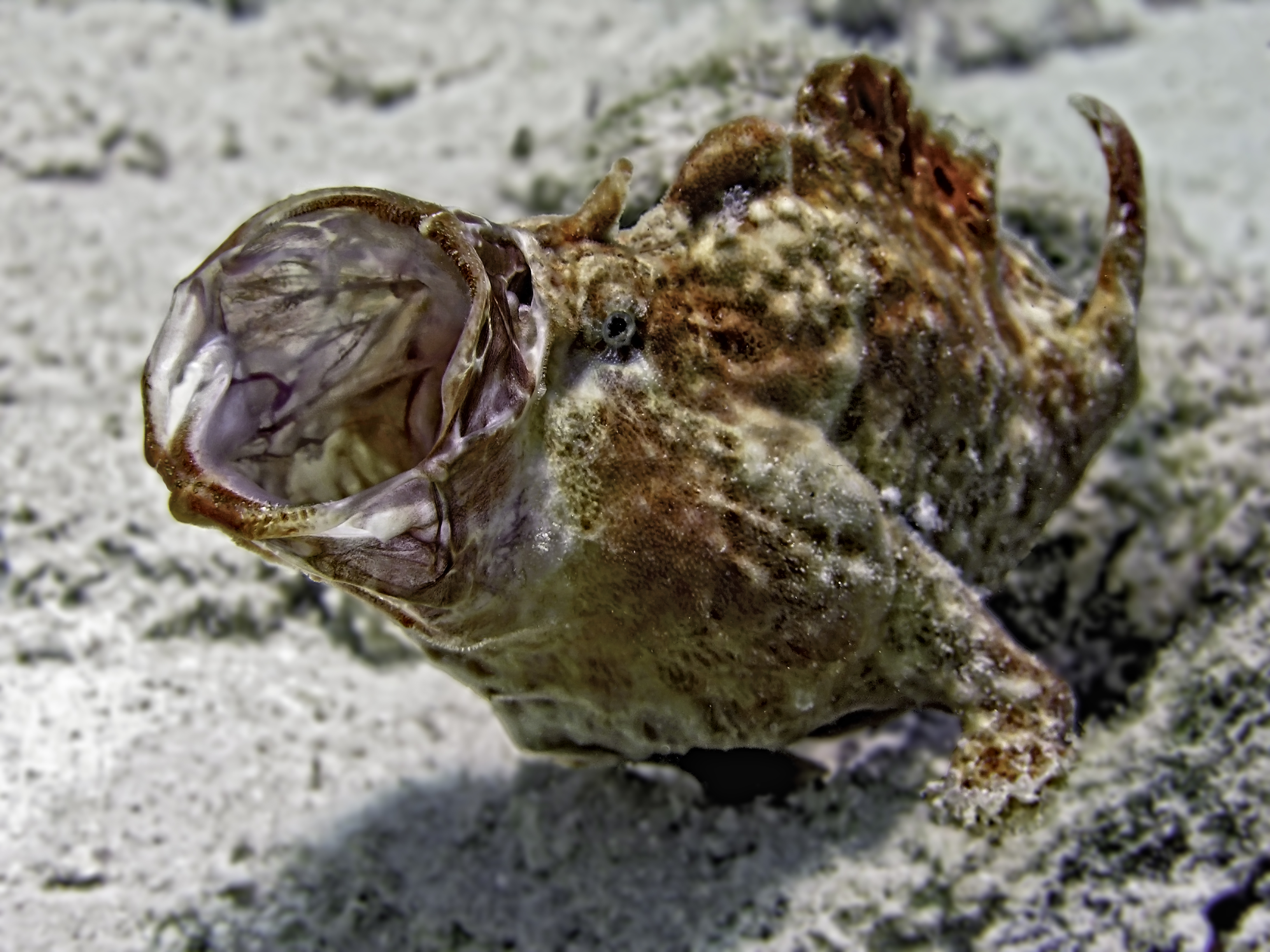
Longlure frogfish realigning its jaw

Frogfishes generally do not move very much, preferring to lie on the sea floor and wait for prey to approach. Once the prey is spotted, they can approach slowly using their pectoral and pelvic fins to walk along the floor. They rarely swim, preferring to clamber over the sea bottom with their fins in one of two "gaits". In the first, they alternately move their pectoral fins forward, propelling themselves somewhat like a two-legged tetrapod, leaving the pelvic fins out. Alternately, they can move in something like a slow gallop, whereby they move their pectoral fins simultaneously forward and back, transferring their weight to the pelvic fins while moving the pectorals forward. With either gait, they can cover only short stretches.

In open water, frogfishes can swim with strokes of the caudal fin. They also use jet propulsion, often used by younger frogfish. It is achieved by rhythmically gulping water and forcing it out through their gill openings, also called opercular openings, which lie behind their pectoral fins.

The sargassum frogfish has adapted fins which can grab strands of sargassum, enabling it to "climb" through the seaweed.

=== Hunting ===
Frogfishes eat crustaceans, other fish, and even each other. When potential prey is first spotted, the frogfish follows it with its eyes. Then, when it approaches within roughly seven body-lengths, the frogfish begins to move its illicium in such a way that the esca mimics the motions of the animal it resembles. As the prey approaches, the frogfish slowly moves to prepare for its attack; sometimes this involves approaching the prey or "stalking", while sometimes it is simply adjusting its mouth angle. The catch itself is made by the sudden opening of the jaws, which enlarges the volume of the mouth cavity up to 12-fold, pulling the prey into the mouth along with water. The attack can be as fast as 6 milliseconds. The water flows out through the gills, while the prey is swallowed and the esophagus closed with a special muscle to keep the victim from escaping. In addition to expanding their mouths, frogfish can also expand their stomachs to swallow animals up to twice their size.

Slow-motion filming has shown that the frogfish sucks in its prey in just six milliseconds, so fast that other animals cannot see it happen.

=== Reproduction ===
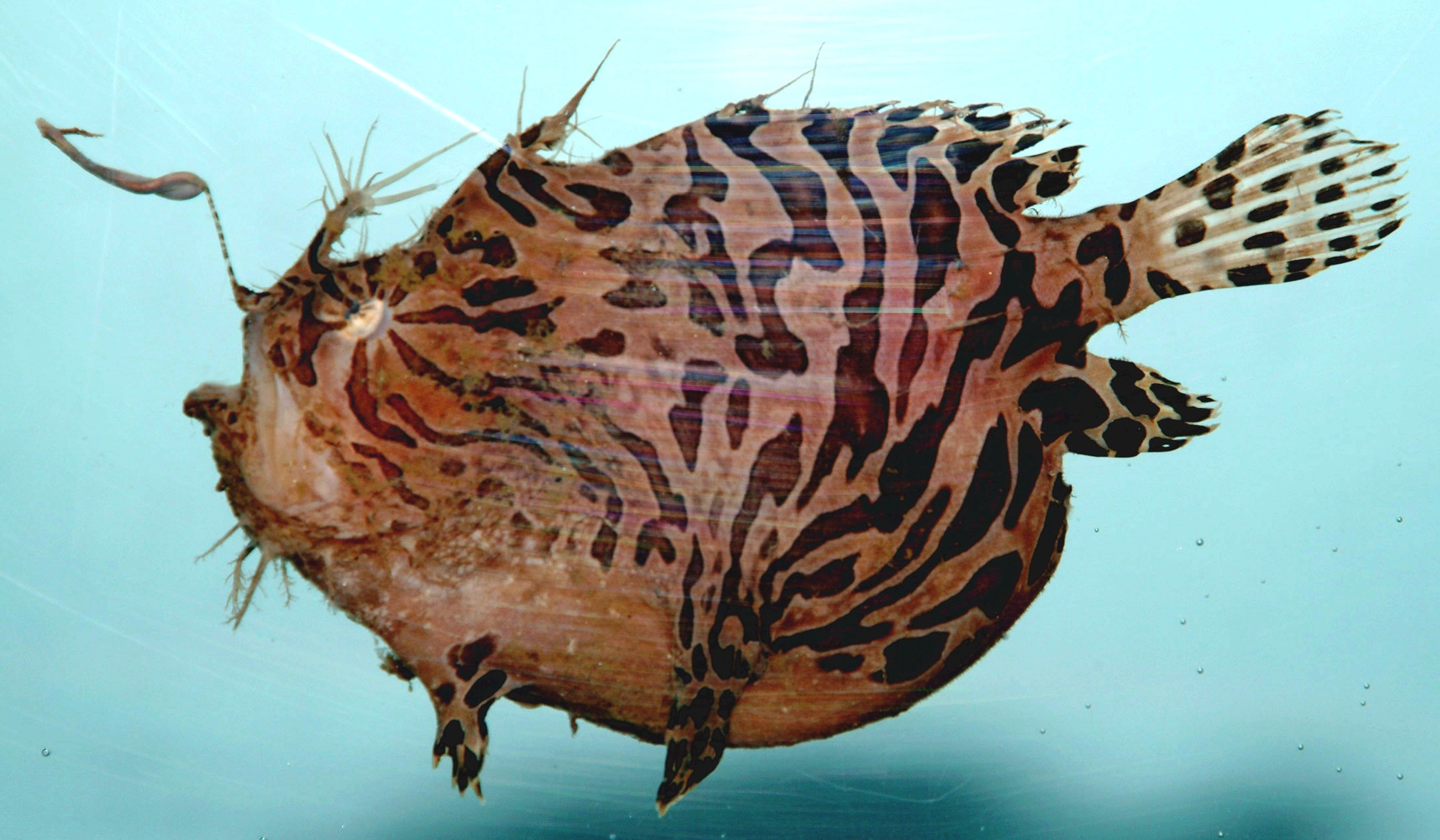
The female striated frogfish does not tolerate the smaller male after fertilization, and may eat him if he stays close.

Striated frogfish mating - YouTube

The reproductive behavior of the normally solitary frogfish is still not fully researched. Few observations in aquaria and even fewer from the wild have been made. Most species are free-spawning, with females laying the eggs in the water and males coming in behind to fertilize them. From eight hours to several days before the egg-laying, the abdomen of the female starts to swell as up to 180,000 eggs absorb water. The male begins to approach the female around two days before the spawning. Whether the spawn is predetermined by some external factor, such as the phase of the moon, or if the male is attracted to a smell or signal released by the female, is unknown. In all hitherto observed breeding pairs, one partner was noticeably larger than the other, sometimes as much as 10 times. When the sex could be determined, the larger partner was always the female.

During the free-spawning courtship ritual, the male swims beside and somewhat behind the female, nudges her with his mouth, then remains near her cloaca. Just before the spawning, the female begins to swim above the ocean floor toward the surface. At the highest point of their swim, they release the eggs and sperm before descending. Sometimes, the male pulls the eggs out of the female with his mouth. After mating, the partners depart quickly as otherwise the smaller male would likely be eaten. A few species are substrate-spawners, notably the genera Lophiocharon, Phyllophryne, and Rhycherus, which lay their eggs on a solid surface, such as a plant or rock. Some species guard their eggs, a duty assigned to the male in almost all species, while most others do not. Several species practice brood carrying, for example the three-spot frogfish, whose eggs are attached to the male, and those in the genus Histiophryne, whose brood are carried in the pectoral fins.

The eggs are 0.5–1 mm (0.020–0.039 in) in diameter and cohere in a gelatinous mass or long ribbon, which in sargassumfish are up to a metre (3.3 ft) long and 16 cm (6.5 in) wide. These egg masses can include up to 180,000 eggs. For most species, the eggs drift on the surface. After two to five days, the fish hatch and the newly hatched alevin are between 0.8 and 1.6 mm (0.031 and 0.063 in) long. For the first few days, they live on the yolk sac while their digestive systems continue to develop. The young have long fin filaments and can resemble tiny, tentacled jellyfish. For one to two months, they live planktonically. After this stage, at a length between 15 and 28 mm (0.59 and 1.10 in), they have the form of adult frogfish and begin their lives on the sea floor. Young frogfish often mimic the coloration of poisonous sea slugs or flatworms.

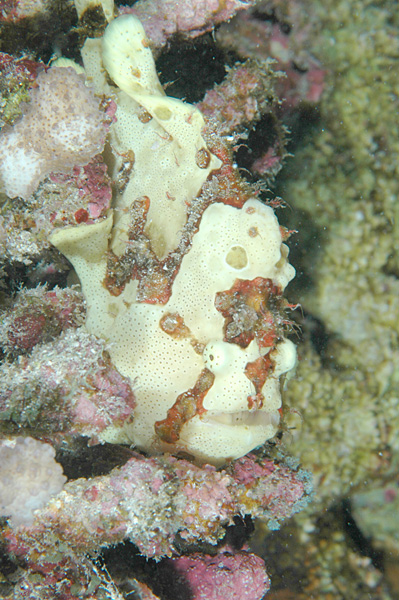
Commerson's frogfish, Kona, Hawaii, Antennarius commerson

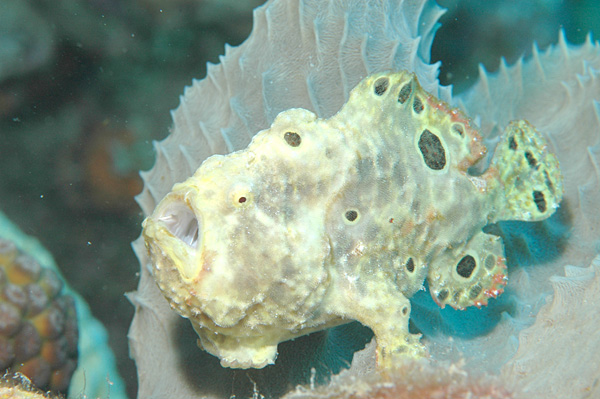
Ocellated frogfish, Bonaire, Netherlands Antilles, A. ocellatus

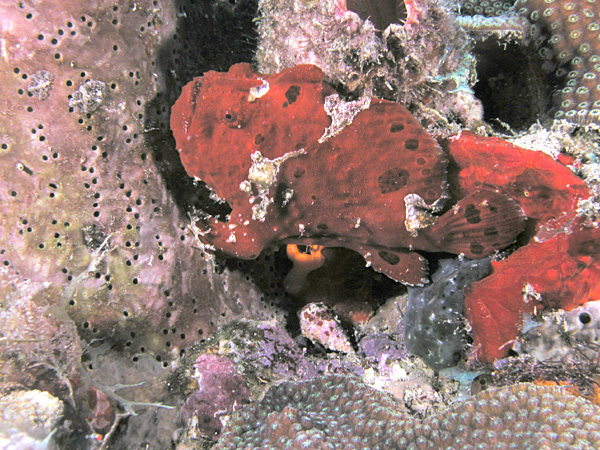
Red ocellated frogfish, St. Kitts, F. ocellatus

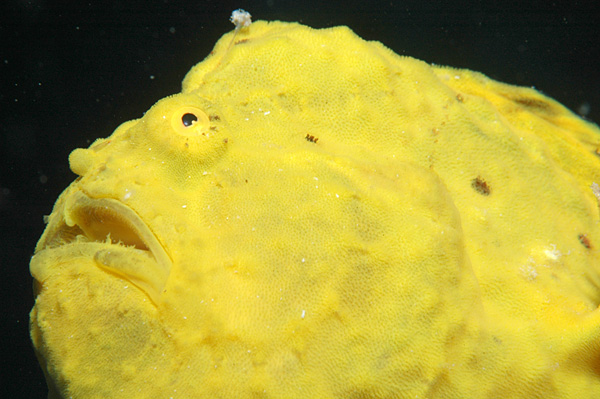
Longlure frogfish, Bonaire, A. multiocellatus

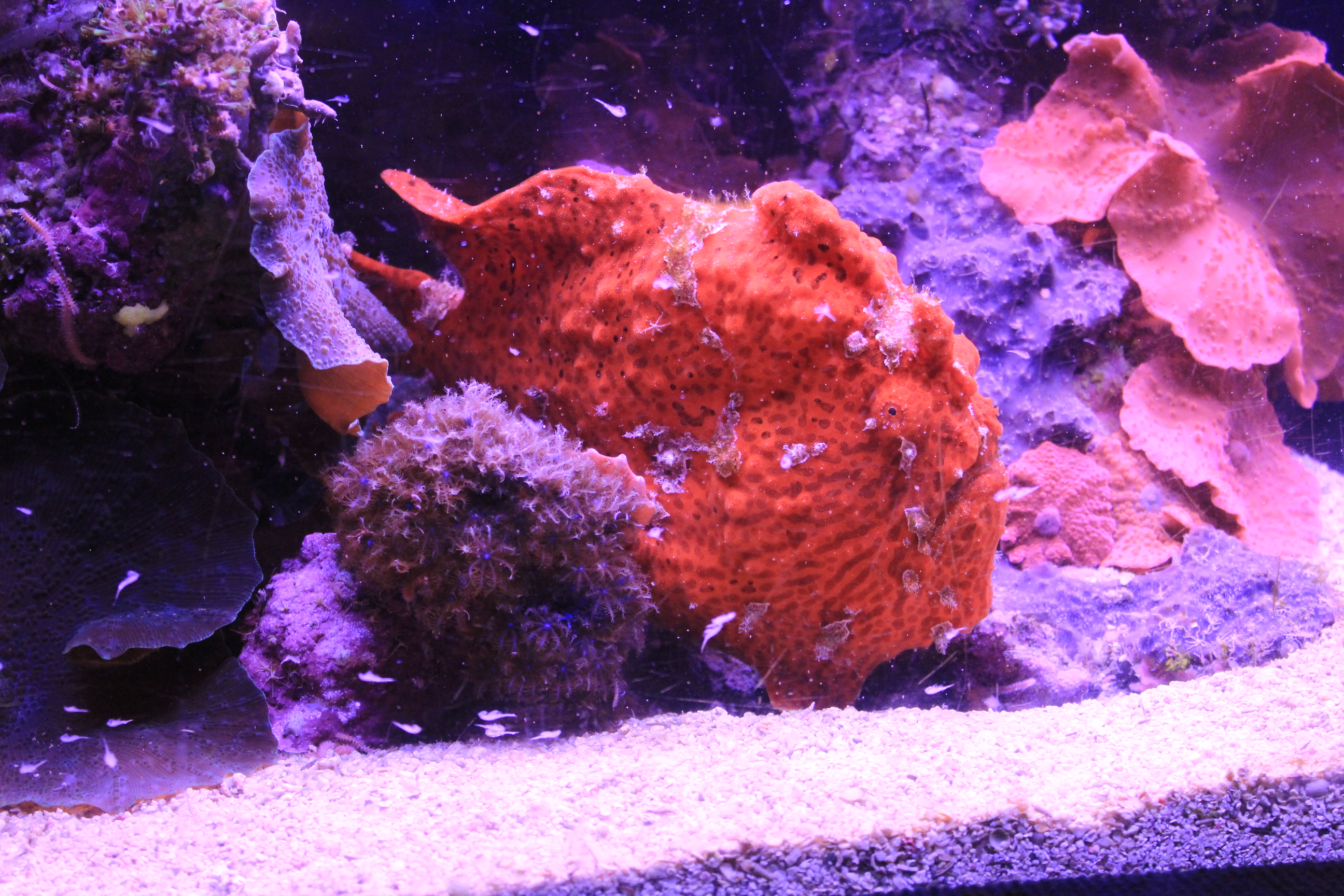
Scarlet frogfish, A. coccineus

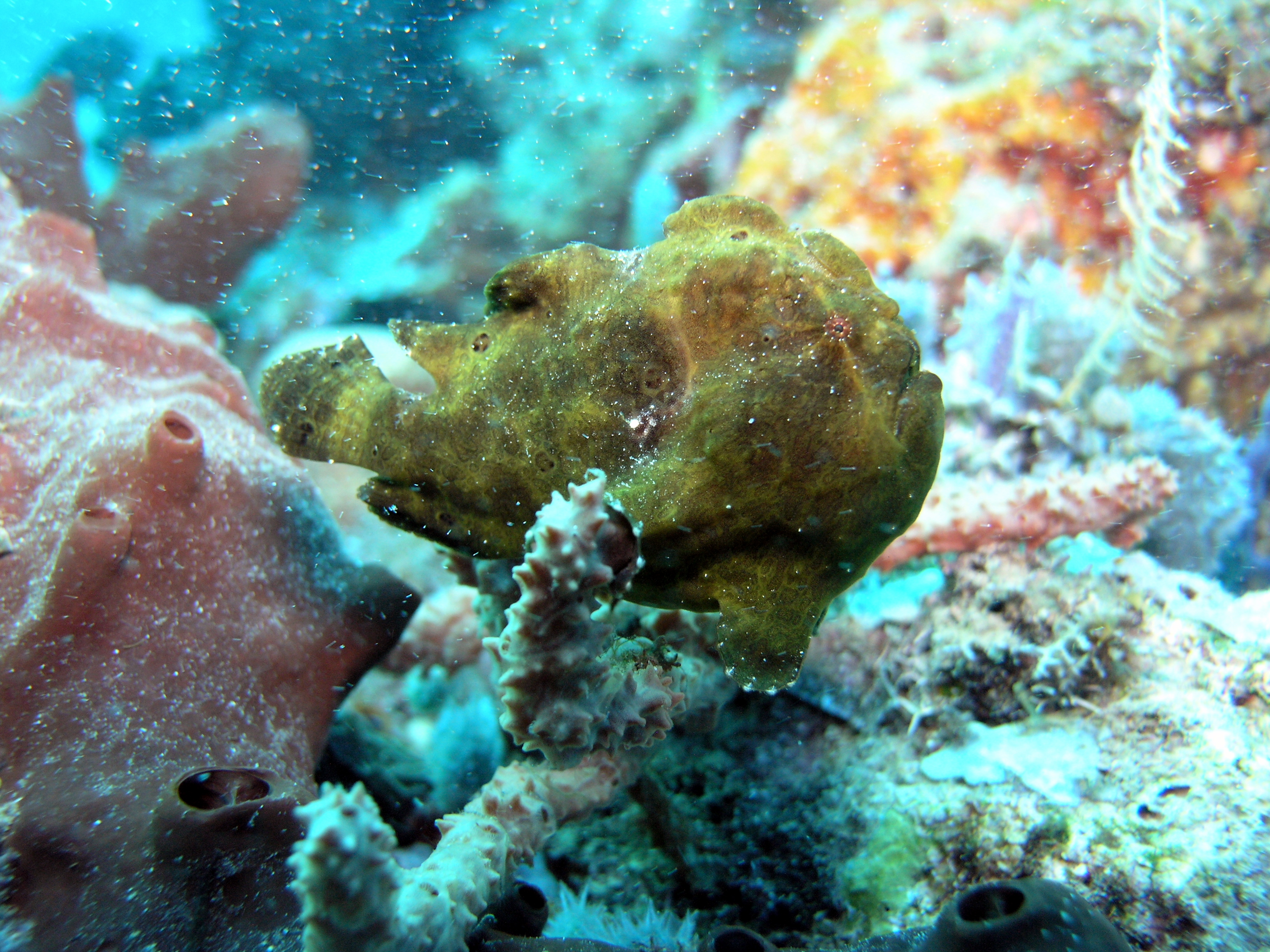
Painted frogfish, A. pictus

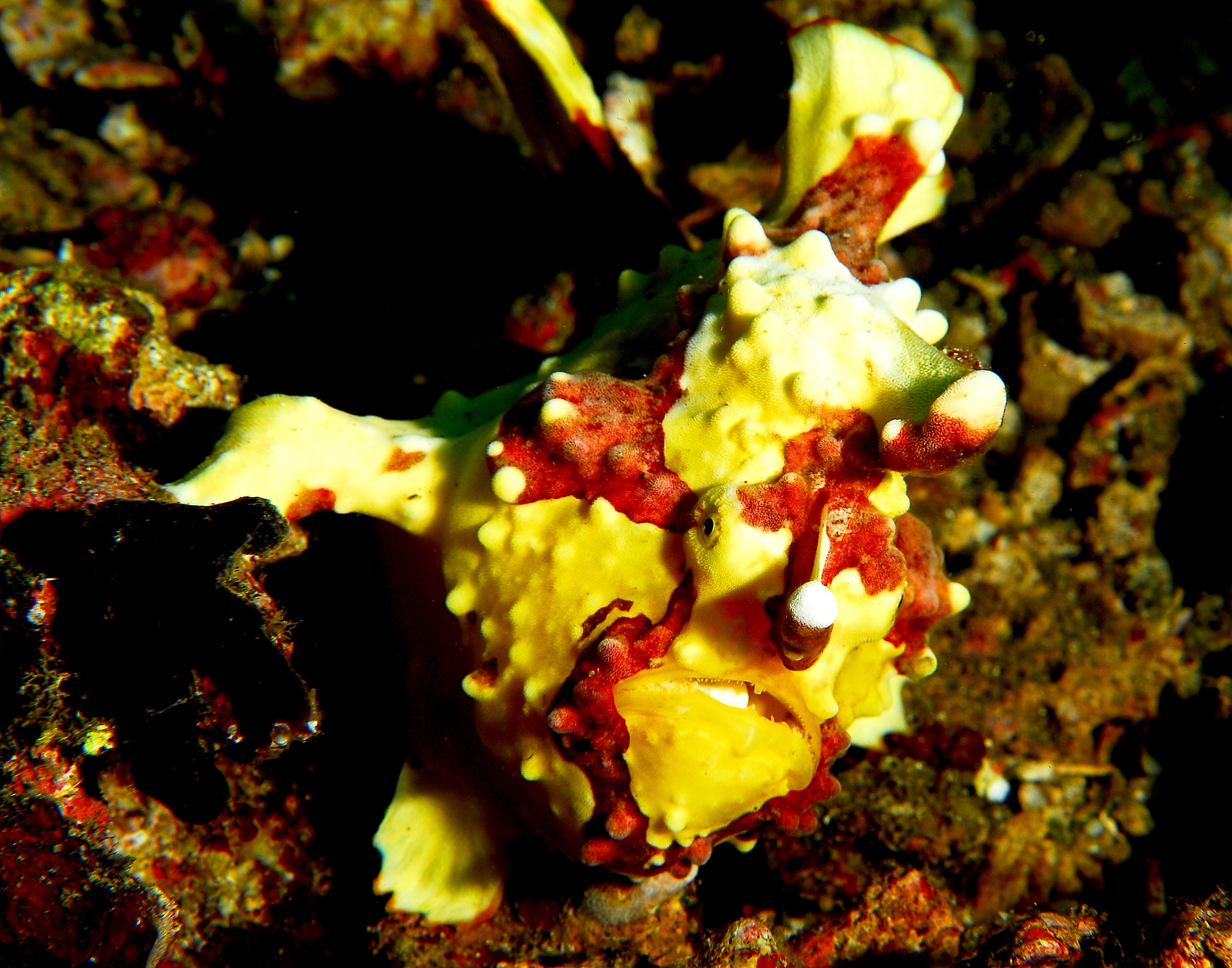
Warty frogfish, A. maculatus

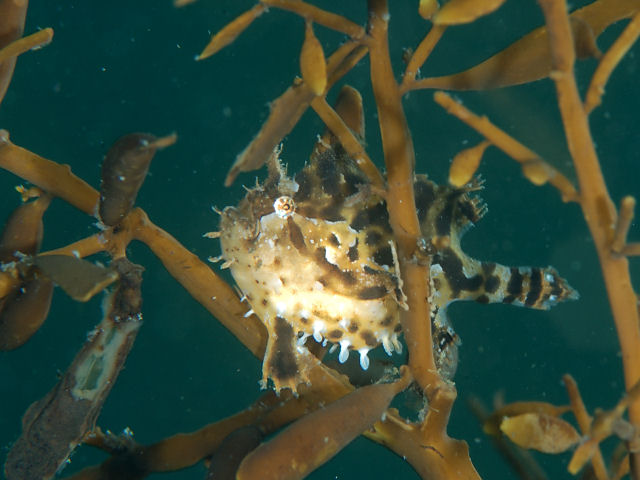
Sargassum fish, Histrio histrio
