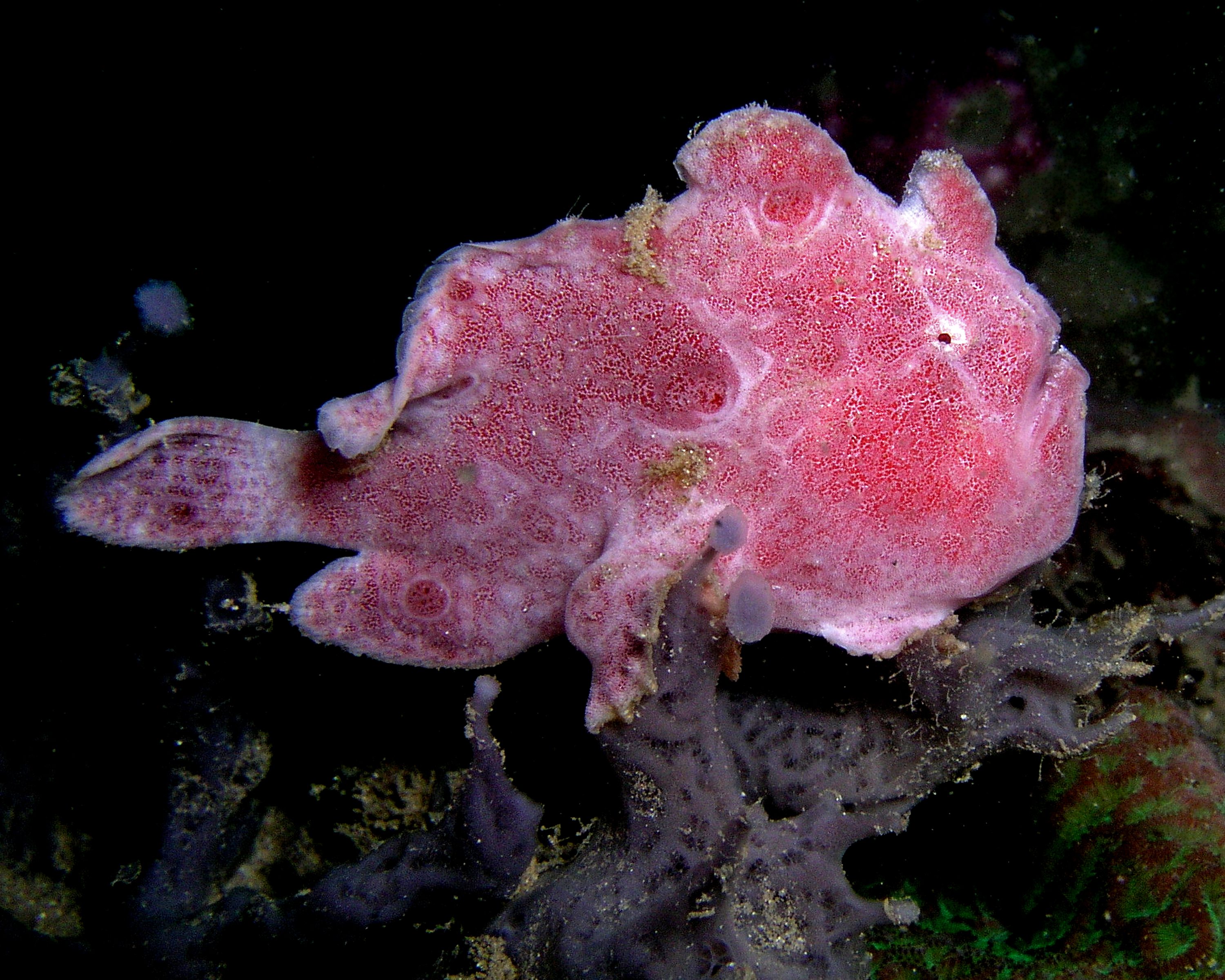

Conservation status
- Least Concern (IUCN 3.1)

Scientific classification
- Kingdom: Animalia
- Phylum: Chordata
- Class: Actinopterygii
- Division: Teleostei
- Order: Lophiiformes
- Family: Antennariidae
- Genus: Antennarius
- Species: A. commerson

Binomial name
- Antennarius commerson (Lacépède, 1798)

= Commerson's frogfish =

Species of fish

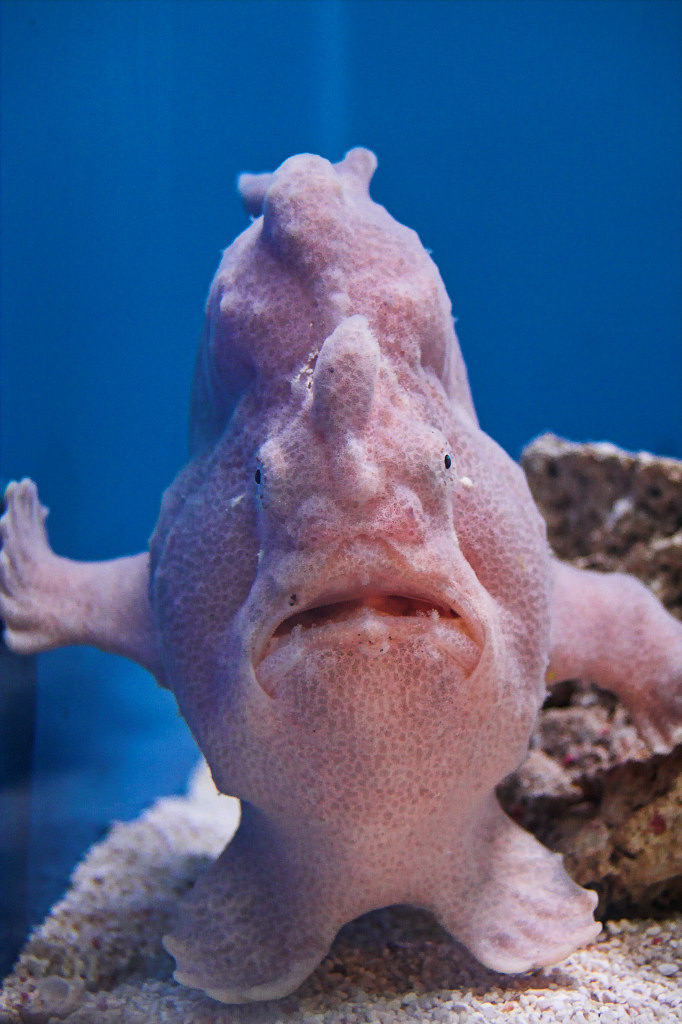
Commerson's frogfish changes its colour through a range of hues, and uses its pelvic fins to walk on the bottom and keep a stable position for ambush.

Commerson's frogfish or the giant frogfish, Antennarius commerson, is a species of euryhaline ray-finned fish belonging to the family Antennariidae, the frogfishes. This fish is found in the Indo-Pacific region.

== Taxonomy ==
Commerson's frogfish was first formally described in 1798 as Lophius commeron by French naturalist Bernard Germain de Lacépède, with its type locality given as Mauritius. Within the genus Antennarius this species belongs to the Antennarius pictus group. The 5th edition of Fishes of the World classifies the genus Antennarius in the family Antennariidae within the suborder Antennarioidei and order Lophiiformes, the anglerfishes.

== Etymology ==
Its latinized generic name Antennarius is from antenna, an allusion to first dorsal spine being adapted into a tentacle on the snout used as a lure to attract prey. The specific name honours Philibert Commerçon, the French naturalist whose note Lacépède used to describe this species in 1798 and propose the French name Lophie commerson, which was also latinised in a book written anonymously in the same year, although name is often erroneously attributed to Pierre André Latreille in 1804.

== Description ==
Commerson's frogfish grows up to 38 cm (15 in) in total length. Like other members of its family, it has a globular, extensible body. Its soft skin is covered with small dermal spinules and partially covered with a few small, wartlike protuberances, some variably shaped, scab-like blotches, and a few, small eye spots (ocelli) reminiscent of the holes in sponges. Its large mouth is prognathous, allowing it to consume prey as large as itself. Its coloration is extremely variable, as this species tends to match its environment. Frogfish can change their coloration in a few weeks, but the dominant coloration goes from grey to black, passing through a whole range of related hues, such as cream, pink, yellow, red, and brown, and also usually with circular eye spots or blotches that are darker than the background. Juvenile specimens can easily be confused with related Antennarius maculatus and Antennarius pictus. To distinguish these species, A. maculatus usually has red or orange margins on all fins, while A. maculatus has numerous warts on the skin, and A. pictus is covered with ocelli. A. pictus has three eye spots on its caudal fin.

The first dorsal spine, the illicium, is modified for use as a fishing rod. Its extremity is endowed with a characteristic esca (lure), which resembles a small fish or shrimp with a pinkish to brownish coloration. The illicium is twice the length of the second dorsal spine and is often darkly banded. The second dorsal spine is practically straight and is mobile, the third one is bent towards the back of the body, and both are membranously attached to the head. They are well separated from each other and also from the dorsal fin.

== Distribution and habitat ==
Antennarius commerson lives in the tropical and subtropical waters from the Indian Ocean to the eastern coasts of the Pacific Ocean. It is found in lagoons and sheltered rocky and coral reefs. It is usually associated with big sponges, on underwater ropes, on jetty pillars, or any structures down to 70 m (230 ft) deep, with an average occurrence at 20 m (66 ft) deep.

== Feeding and behavior ==
As all frogfishes, A. commerson is a voracious carnivore that attacks any small animals that pass within range, mainly other fish, but sometimes even congeners. Commerson's frogfish has a benthic and solitary lifestyle. They gather during the mating period, but do not tolerate each other anymore after the act of fertilization. The female can kill or eat the male if he stays close. It uses a small tuft of flattened appendage as a fishing lure.
