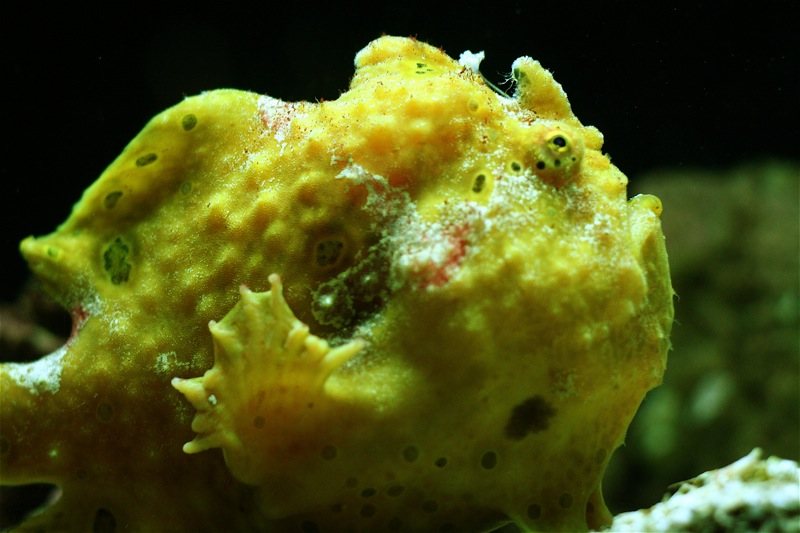

Conservation status
- Least Concern (IUCN 3.1)

Scientific classification
- Kingdom: Animalia
- Phylum: Chordata
- Class: Actinopterygii
- Order: Lophiiformes
- Family: Antennariidae
- Genus: Antennarius
- Species: A. pardalis

Binomial name
- Antennarius pardalis (Valenciennes, 1837)

Synonyms
- Chironectes pardalis Valenciennes, 1837; Antennarius campylacanthus Bleeker, 1863; Lophiocharon campylacanthus (Bleeker, 1863)

= Antennarius pardalis =

Species of fish

Antennarius pardalis, the leopard frogfish or peixe pescador, is a species of marine ray-finned fish belonging to the family Antennariidae, the frogfishes. This species is found in the eastern Atlantic Ocean.

== Taxonomy ==
Antennarius pardalis was first formally described as Chironectes pardalis in 1837 by the French zoologist Achille Valenciennes with its type locality given as Gorée in Senegal. Within the genus Antennarius the leopard frogfish belongs to the pictus species group. The 5th edition of Fishes of the World classifies the genus Antennarius in the family Antennariidae within the suborder Antennarioidei within the order Lophiiformes, the anglerfishes.

== Etymology ==
Antennarius pardalis has the genus name Antennarius which suffixes -ius to antenna, an allusion to first dorsal spine being adapted into a tentacle on the snout used as a lure to attract prey. The specific name pardalis means "leopard-like", a reference to the black spots and ocelli on the red body.

== Description ==
Antennarius pardalis has the globose, short body covered in rough skin with closely set spinules typical of the genus Antennarius. The lobe of the pectoral fin has a broad connection to the body with pelvic fins are short, less than a quarter of the standard length. The illicium is long, roughly double the length of the second dorsal spine. The second dorsal spine is attached to the head by a membrane. The body and fins are typically marked with dark spots and ocelli, frequently with three spots on the caudal fin arranged in a triangular pattern. The dorsal fin contains between 11 and 14 soft rays while the anal fin contains between 6 and 10 soft rays. The large mouth has many small, bristle-like teeth. This species has a maximum published standard length of 10.2 cm (4.0 in).

== Distribution and habitat ==
Antennarius pardalis is found in the eastern Atlantic Ocean along the western coast of Africa from southern Western Sahara to Angola, including Cape Verde and São Tomé and Príncipe. It is found in coastal waters at depths between 18 and 50 m (59 and 164 ft) on rocky reefs and rocky reefs.

== Biology ==
Antennarius pardalis is an ambush predator which lures prey towards its mouth with a lure on the illicium. The females lay eggs in large, floating gelatinous masses,
