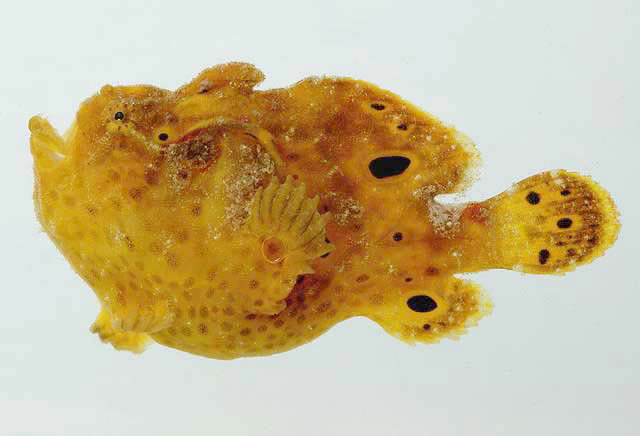

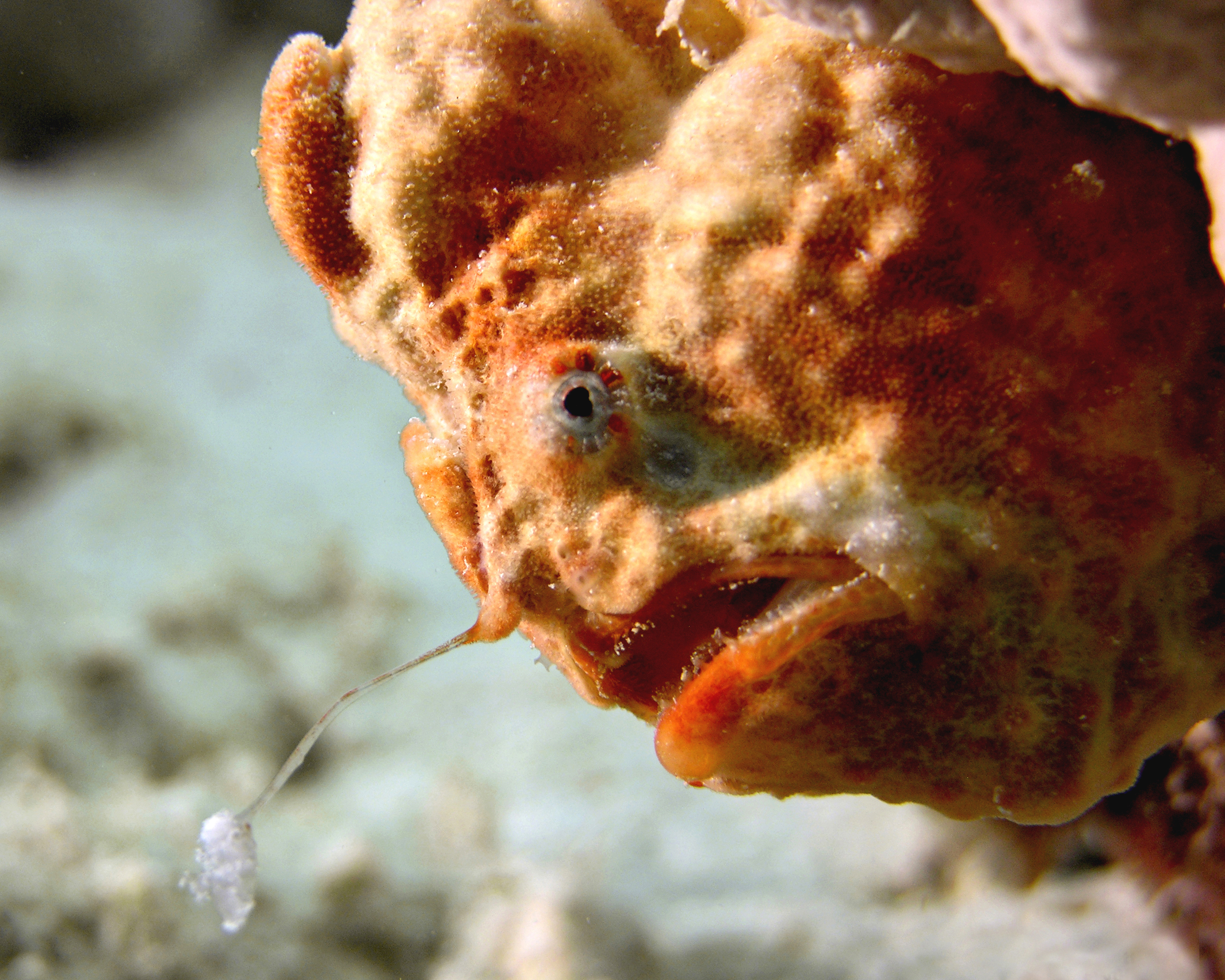

Conservation status
- Least Concern (IUCN 3.1)

Scientific classification
- Kingdom: Animalia
- Phylum: Chordata
- Class: Actinopterygii
- Division: Teleostei
- Order: Lophiiformes
- Family: Antennariidae
- Genus: Antennarius
- Species: A. multiocellatus

Binomial name
- Antennarius multiocellatus (Valenciennes, 1837)
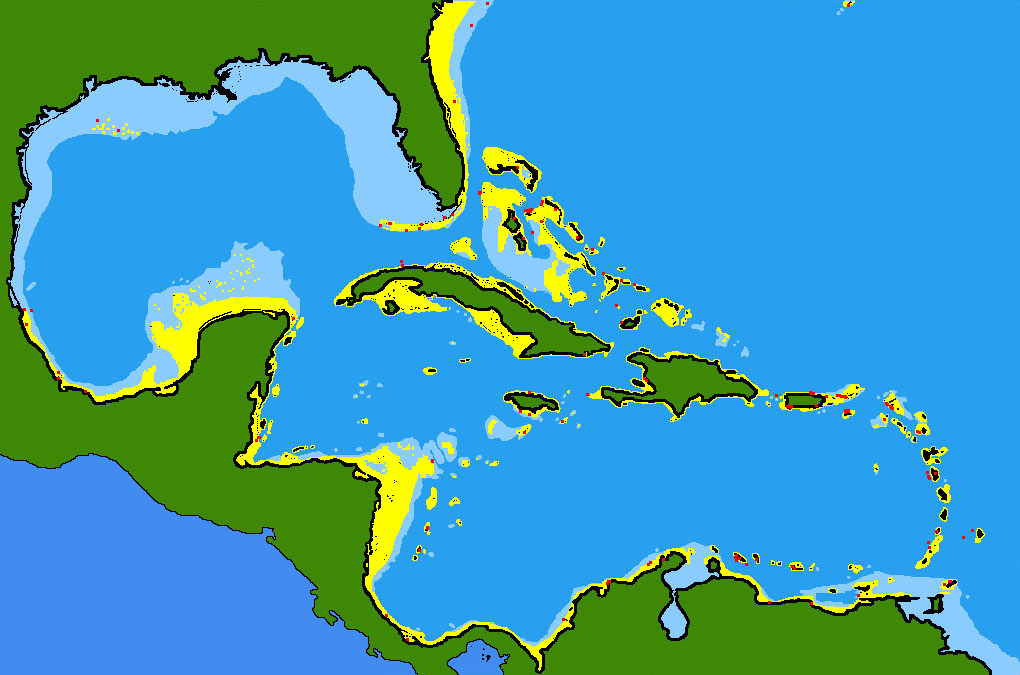

Synonyms
- Chironectes multiocellatus Valenciennes, 1837; Chironectes principis Valenciennes, 1837; Chironectes pavoninus Valenciennes, 1837; Antennarius annulatus Gill, 1863; Antennarius corallinus Poey, 1865; Antennarius stellifer Barbour, 1905; Antennarius verrucosus Bean, 1906; Antennarius astroscopus Nichols, 1912

= Longlure frogfish =

Species of fish

The longlure frogfish (Antennarius multiocellatus), also known as the flagpole frogfish, is a species of marine ray-finned fish belonging to the family Antennariidae, the frogfishes. This species is found in the western Atlantic. The longlure frogfish mimics its background habitat of sponges.

== Taxonomy ==
The longlure frogfish was first formally described as Chironectes multiocellatus in 1837 by the French zoologist Achille Valenciennes with its type locality given as Havana. Within the genus Antennarius the longlure frogfish belongs to the pictus species group. The 5th edition of Fishes of the World classifies the genus Antennarius in the family Antennariidae within the suborder Antennarioidei within the order Lophiiformes, the anglerfishes.

== Etymology ==
The longlure frogfish has the genus name Antennarius which suffixes -ius to antenna, an allusion to first dorsal spine being adapted into a tentacle on the snout used as a lure to attract prey. The specific name multiocellatus combines multi, meaning "many", with ocellatus, meaning ocellus or eyespot, an allusion to the many eye-like spots on the flanks.

== Characteristics ==
the longlure frogfish is a bottom dweller, mimicking the surrounding sponges by varying its background hue to match that of the dominant sponge in the area. It also has multiple ocellii (eye-like markings) that look like the openings in a sponge. The frogfish uses its stalked pectoral fins and its pelvic fins to slowly "walk" across the bottom. Frogfishes have been observed inflating themselves by filling their stomachs with air or water. This is a solitary species found in small populations. It is the most common frogfish species in the West Indies and harmless to humans.

== Distinctive features ==
The longlure frogfish has a short, fat, globular body, and its skin is thick and covered in highly modified scales called dermal spicules. These spicules are prickly in appearance and resemble the warts of a toad. The frogfish has small eyes, a very large mouth that is directed upwards, and pectoral fins situated on stalks. The gill openings are very small and located behind the pectoral fins. The basic color of the longlure frogfish is highly variable, ranging from pale yellow to bright red or dark green to reddish brown. Black spots are scattered across the body no matter what the base color. It also has a phase where the body is completely black, except for the ends of the paired fins which are white, and for a pale area that resembles a saddle on the back. The second and third dorsal spines are separate from the others and covered in thick skin. This species has a maximum published total length of 20 cm (7.9 in).

== Distribution and habitat ==
The longlure frogfish is found in the Western Atlantic from Bermuda and the Bahamas, eastern Florida, in the Gulf of Mexico from the Florida Keys and the Flower Garden Banks to Tuxpan and along the Yucatan Peninsula to Cuba. It occurs throughout the Caribbean Sea and along the coasts of South America as far south as Salvador, Bahia in northeastern Brazil. It also extends to around the Fernando de Noronha islands and east as far as Ascension Island. This species is found at depths between 0 and 66 m (0 and 217 ft) on shallow reefs, especially in areas with sponges.

== Reproduction ==
The longlure frogfish, like other frogfishes, spawns eggs that are encapsulated in a buoyant mass of mucus, referred to as an "egg raft". This structure may serve as a transport of moving a large number of eggs over a large geographical distances. Spawning can be dangerous for the frogfish due to the cannibalistic nature of the species. The male and female march across the bottom before spawning, with the female leading and the male close behind. His snout usually is in immediate contact with her vent. The female is bloated with eggs during this time, often swelling to twice her normal size. The pair will then make a dash to the surface and the egg mass bursts from the female. The frogfish may spawn several times over a few weeks.

== Diet ==
The longlure frogfish is an ambush predator, it feeds mainly on fishes, but also on crabs and mantis shrimp. The name "longlure" is refers to the elongated illicium which acts as a fishing lure. The illicium is the first spine of the dorsal fin, highly modified into a long rod with a lure (esca) at the end. In most species, the esca looks like potential prey, such as a worm, crustacean, or even a fish. The frogfish will lie in a sponge and wait for a fish to swim by. It will then wiggle the lure around to attract the prey. It is capable of swallowing a fish that is larger in size than itself. Like a recreational human angler, the frogfish will move to a different location if no fish are biting. Frogfishes are reported to be the fastest animal alive. It can move and suck in prey at speeds as quickly as 0.006 seconds, so only high-speed film can catch the action.
