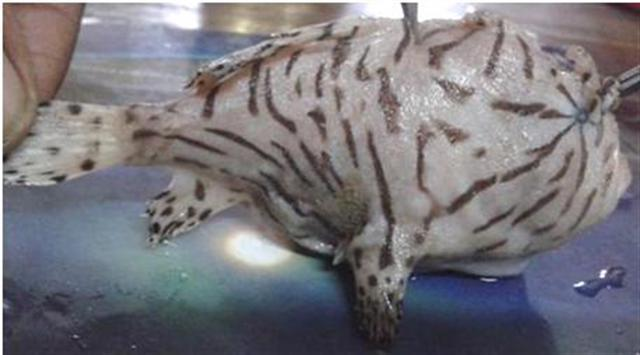

Conservation status
- Least Concern (IUCN 3.1)

Scientific classification
- Kingdom: Animalia
- Phylum: Chordata
- Class: Actinopterygii
- Division: Teleostei
- Order: Lophiiformes
- Family: Antennariidae
- Genus: Antennarius
- Species: A. indicus

Binomial name
- Antennarius indicus Schultz, 1964

= Antennarius indicus =

Species of fish

Antennarius indicus, the Indian frogfish, is a species of marine ray-finned fish belonging to the family Antennariidae, the frogfishes. The Indian frogfish inhabits the Indian Ocean.

== Taxonomy ==
A. indicus was first formally described in 1964 by Leonard Peter Schultz with its type locality given as Vizagapatam in India. Within the genus Antennarius the Indian frogfish belongs to the striatus species group. The 5th edition of Fishes of the World classified Antennarius in Antennariidae within the suborder Antennarioidei within the order Lophiiformes, the anglerfishes.

== Etymology ==
A. indicus has the genus name Antennarius which suffixes -ius to antenna, an allusion to first dorsal spine being adapted into a tentacle on the snout used as a lure to attract prey. The specific name indicus refers to the type locality in India.

== Description ==
A. indicus has an illicium that is roughly equal in length to the second dorsal spine and which has an esca, or lure that is made up of leaf-like appendages. The dorsal fin has 12 soft rays while the anal fin has 7 soft rays. The body colour is tawny to brown marked with dark brown to black bars on the fins, which may be interconnected and which form stripes when the fins are folded. It features 2 or 3 obvious pale-margined ocelli, one below the base of the dorsal fin, one above and to the rear of the base of the pectoral fin and the other close to the base of the anal fin. Preserved specimens may be beige with pale fins and dark mottling. The Indian frogfish has a maximum published length of 23 cm (9.1 in).

== Distribution and habitat ==
A. indicus inhabits the western Indian Ocean from the Gulf of Aden to northern Mozambique to southeastern India and Sri Lanka, including the Seychelles and Lakshadweep. The Indian frogfish occurs between 0 and 30 m (0 and 98 ft) in sandy and muddy habitats close to coral reefs and algal beds.
