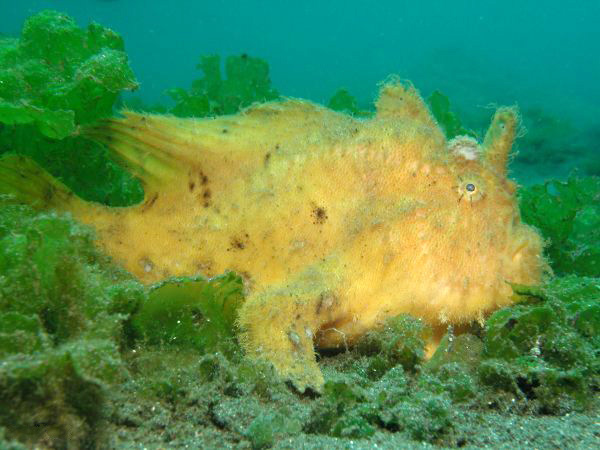
- Shaggy frogfish

Conservation status
- Least Concern (IUCN 3.1)

Scientific classification
- Kingdom: Animalia
- Phylum: Chordata
- Class: Actinopterygii
- Order: Lophiiformes
- Family: Antennariidae
- Genus: Antennarius
- Species: A. hispidus

Binomial name
- Antennarius hispidus (Bloch & Schneider, 1801)

Synonyms
- Lophius hispidus Bloch & Schneider, 1801; Chironectes hispidus (Bloch & Schneider, 1801)

= Shaggy frogfish =

Species of fish

The shaggy frogfish (Antennarius hispidus), also known as the hispid frogfish, shaggy anglerfish or zebra anglerfish, is a marine ray-finned fish belonging to the family Antennariidae, the frogfishes. This fish is found in the Indo-Pacific.

== Taxonomy ==
The shaggy frogfish was first formally described in 1801 as Lophius hispidus by the German naturalists Marcus Elieser Bloch and Johann Gottlob Theaenus Schneider with its type locality given as the Coromandel Coast of India. Within the genus Antennarius the shaggy frogfish belongs to the striatus species group. The 5th edition of Fishes of the World classifies the genus Antennarius in the family Antennariidae within the suborder Antennarioidei within the order Lophiiformes, the anglerfishes.

== Etymology ==
The shaggy frogfish has the genus name Antennarius which suffixes -ius to antenna, an allusion to first dorsal spine being adapted into a tentacle on the snout used as a lure to attract prey. The specific name hispida means "bristly", a reference to the dense covering of spinules on the skin.

== Description ==
The shaggy frogfish grows up to 20 cm (7.9 in) in length. Like other members of its family, it has a globulous, extensible body, and its soft skin is covered with small dermal spinules. The skin can also be adorned, but not systematically, with cutaneous appendages reminding one of hairs. Its large mouth is prognathous and allows it to gobble up prey as large as itself. The colouring of their bodies is extremely variable because they always tend to match their living environments. Frogfishes have the capacity to change colour and pigment pattern in few weeks. However, the dominant colour goes from yellow to brownish-orange, passing through a whole range of related nuances. Their bodies and fins can be endowed with roughly parallel, dark stripes, some radiating outward from the eye. The belly is free from stripes.

The first dorsal spine, called illicium, is modified and is used as a fishing lure. Its extremity is endowed with a characteristic oval esca composed of a multitude of slender filaments in a tuft. This lure is a way to separate easily A. hispidus from Antennarius striatus, which presents similar physical characteristics (stripes, coloration, cutaneous appendages) and with which it is often confused. The illicium has the same length as the second dorsal spine. The second dorsal spine is practically straight and is mobile, and the third one is bent towards the back of the body. They are well separated from each other and also from the dorsal fin.

== Distribution ==
Shaggy frogfish are found in tropical coastal waters from Indian Ocean and in the middle of the Indo-Pacific area, but are absent from oceanic islands.

== Habitat ==
This species inhabits shallow rocky and coral reefs to deep muddy habitats. It can be found from the surface to 90 m deep with average occurrences at 45 m.

== Feeding ==
As all frogfishes, A. hispidus is a voracious carnivore which gulps down all the prey which pass in its strike area, mainly fish, but even some congeners. Its prey range in size up to close to its own size.

== Behaviour ==
Like other members of its family, it has a benthic and solitary lifestyle. They gather during mating period. but do not tolerate each other any more after the act of fertilisation. The male can kill or eat the female if she stays close.
