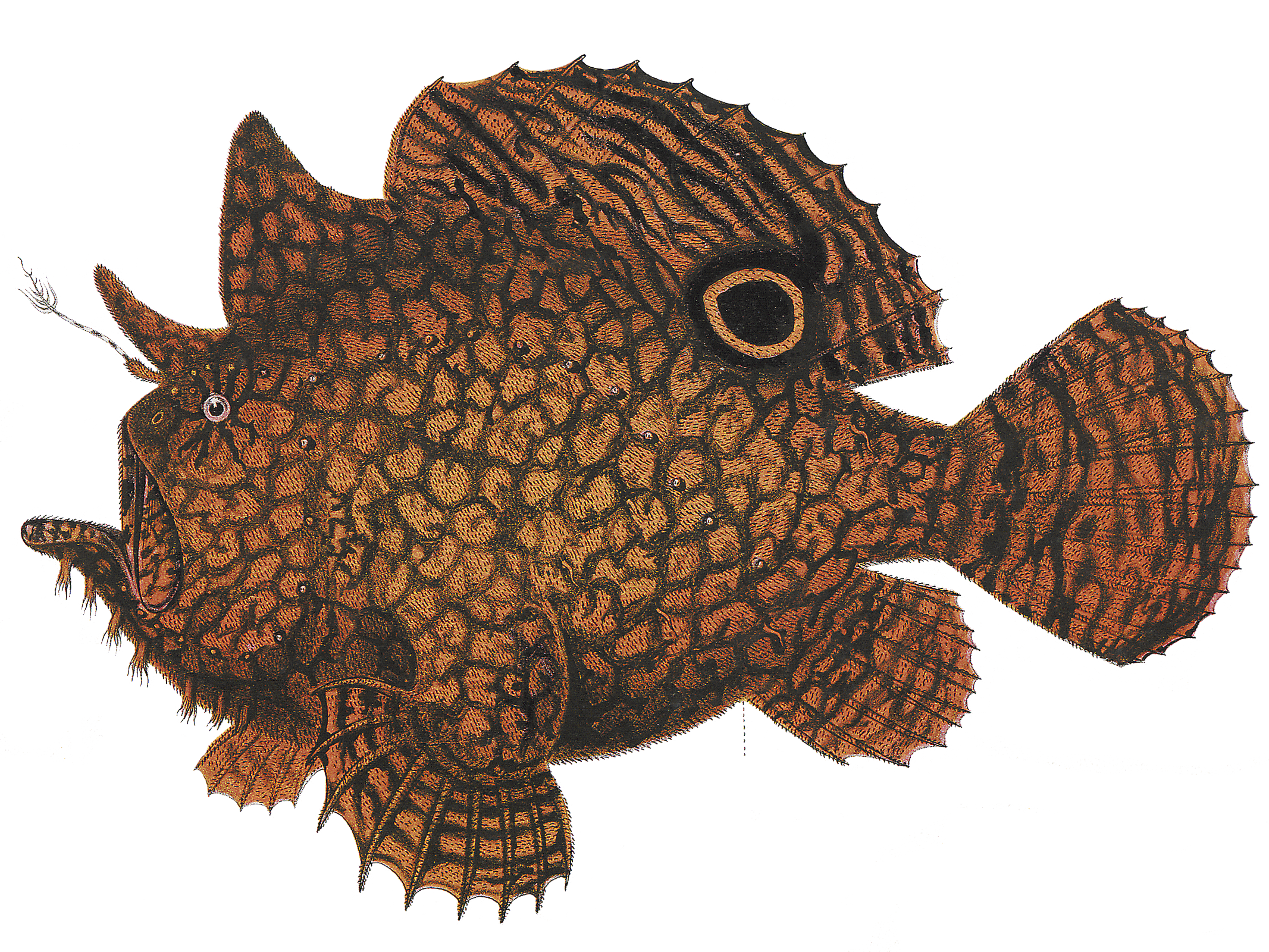

Conservation status
- Data Deficient (IUCN 3.1)

Scientific classification
- Kingdom: Animalia
- Phylum: Chordata
- Class: Actinopterygii
- Division: Teleostei
- Order: Lophiiformes
- Family: Antennariidae
- Genus: Antennarius
- Species: A. biocellatus

Binomial name
- Antennarius biocellatus Cuvier, 1817

Synonyms
- Chironectes biocellatus Cuvier, 1817; Antennarius notophthalmus Bleeker, 1854

= Antennarius biocellatus =

Species of fish

Antennarius biocellatus, the brackish water frogfish, brackish water anglerfish, freshwater frogfish, twinspot frogfish or fishing frog, is a species of euryhaline ray-finned fish belonging to the family Antennariidae, the frogfishes. This fish is found in the Western Pacific Ocean.

== Taxonomy ==
Antennarius biocellatus' was first formally described as Chironectes biocellatus in 1817 by the French zoologist Georges Cuvier, the type locality is not known. Within the genus Antennarius this species is a sister taxon to all of the others. The 5th edition of Fishes of the World classifies the genus Antennarius in the family Antennariidae within the suborder Antennarioidei within the order Lophiiformes, the anglerfishes.

== Etymology ==
Antennarius biocellatus has the genus name Antennarius which suffixes -ius to antenna, an allusion to first dorsal spine being adapted into a tentacle on the snout used as a lure to attract prey. The specific name biocellatus. this means "two little eyes" and is an allusion to the two ocelli, one on the rear of the base of the dorsal fin, and the other (not always present) on the caudal peduncle.

== Description ==
Antennarius biocellatus has a second dorsal spine which is longer than the first dorsal spine, the illicium which is tipped with a small esca, or lure. The second dorsal spine is not connected to the head by a membrane. The ocellus at the base of the rear of the dorsal fin is surrounded by a thin pale yellow, black-margined ring. The body is deep and slightly compressed. The second dorsal fin has 12 soft rays while the anal fin has 6 or 7 soft rays. This species has a maximum published standard length of 14 cm (5.5 in).

== Distribution and habitat ==
Antennarius biocellatus is found in the Western Pacific Ocean from Indonesia and the Philippines east through New Guinea and the Solomon Islands, north to Taiwan. records from elsewhere require verification. It is found at depths between 0 and 10 m (0 and 33 ft) in estuaries and inshore waters, including reefs. It has been recorded entering freshwater.

== Biology ==
Antennarius biocellatus is and ambush predator which sits still and lures prey to its mouth using the esca. The females lay eggs in a gelatinous mass or ribbon known as an "egg-raft" or "veil".

== Gallery ==
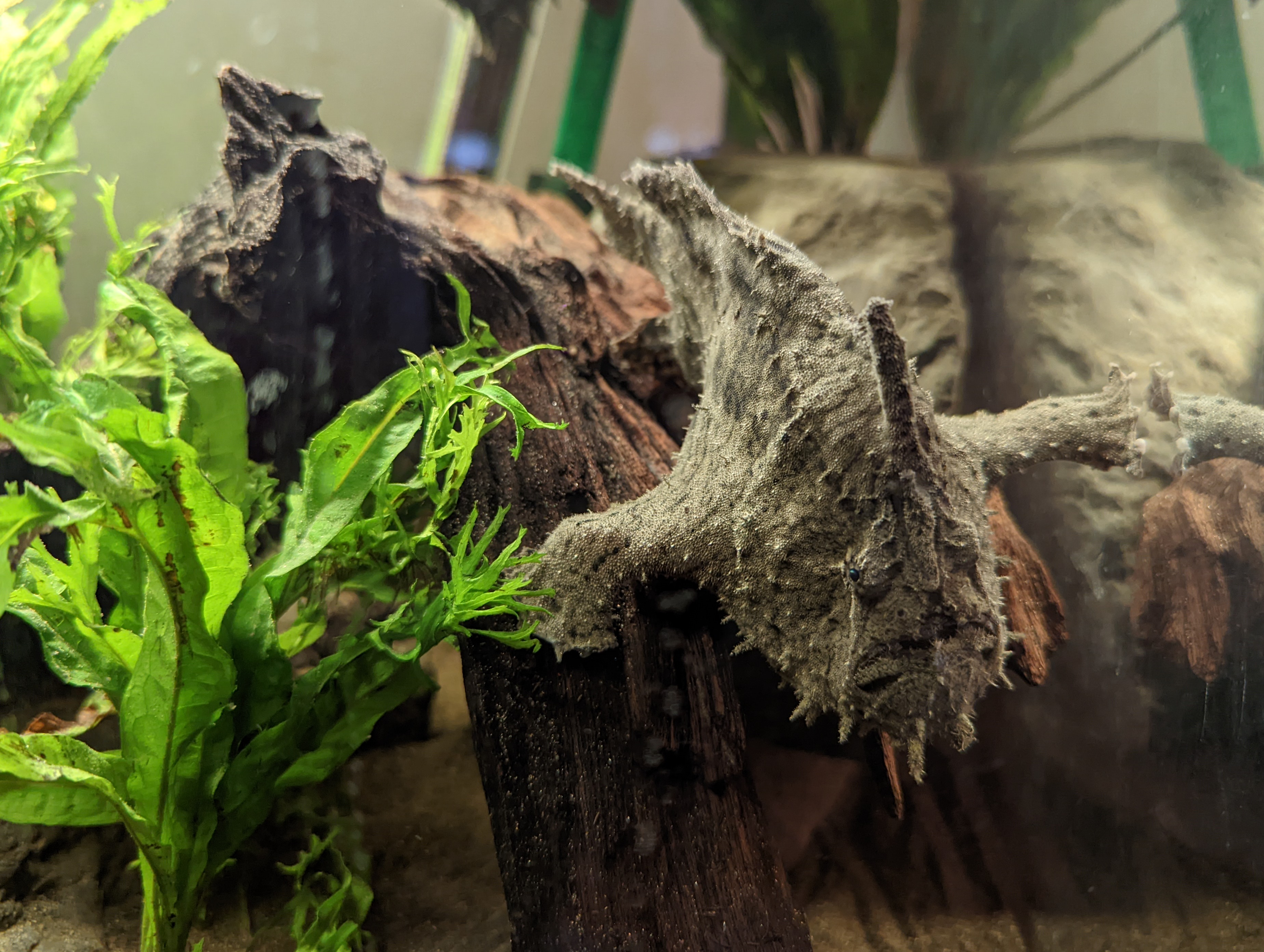
Brackish-water frogfish using pectoral fins for locomotion

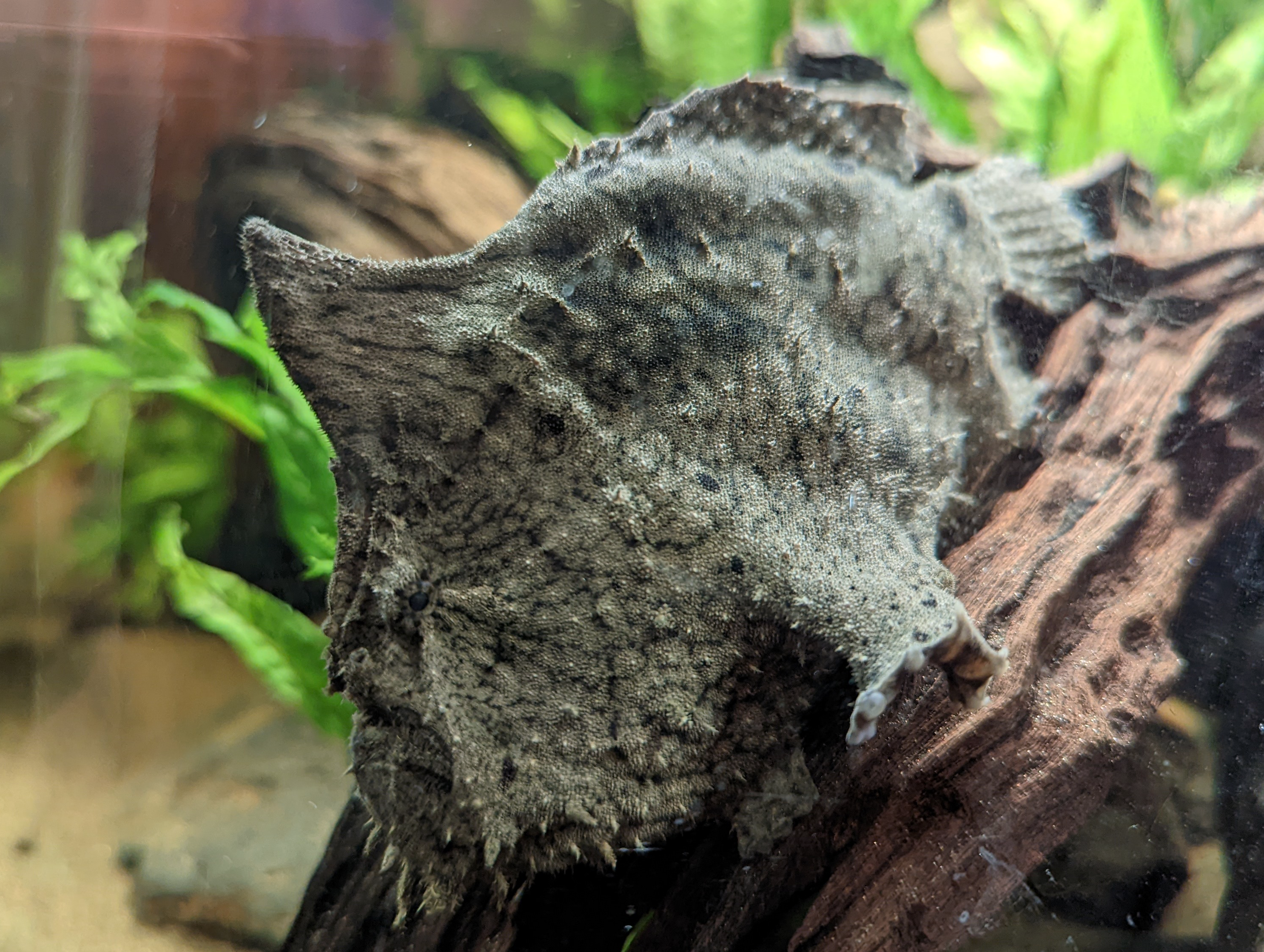
Brackish-water frogfish detail

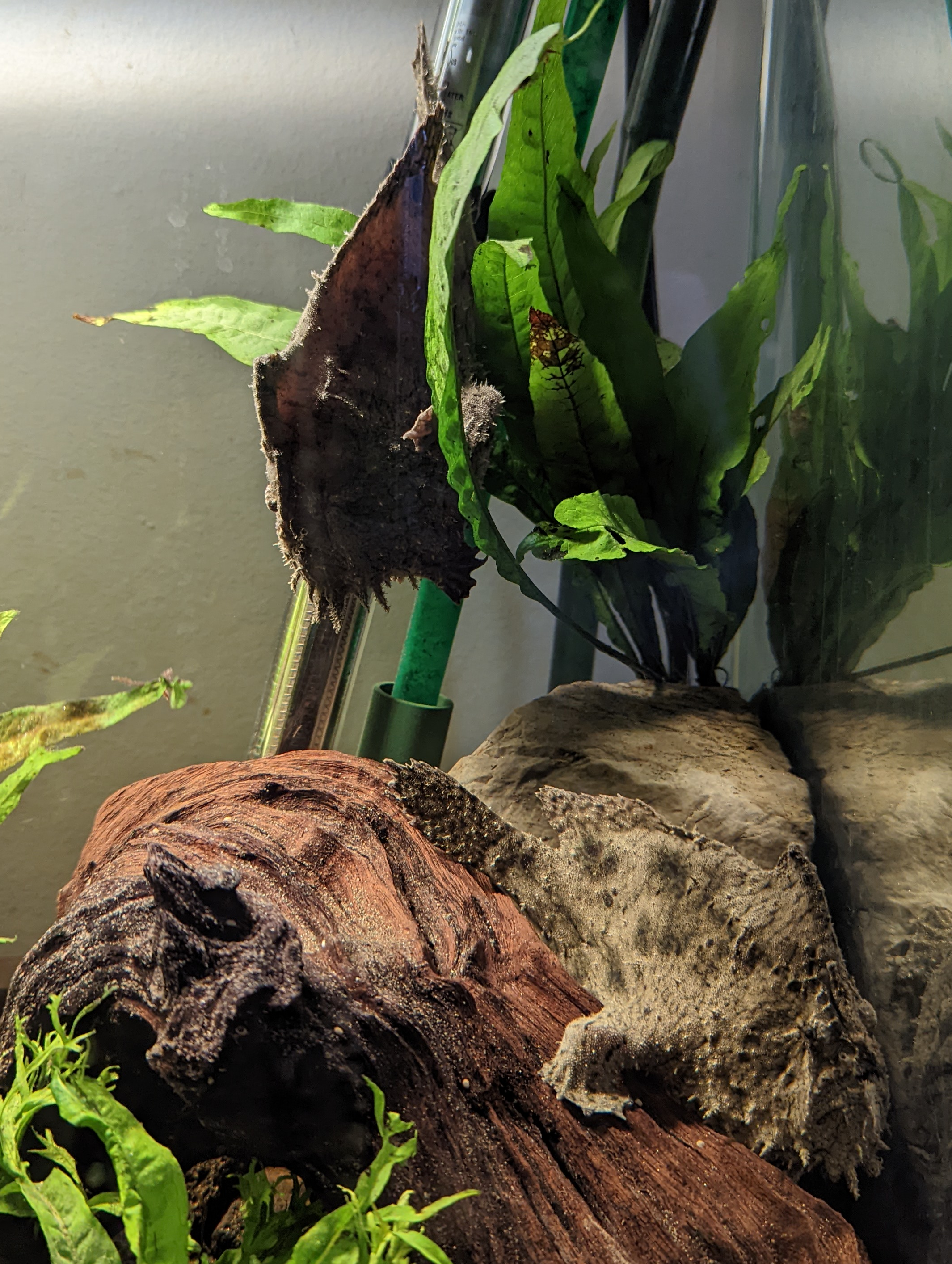
two Brackish-water frogfish
