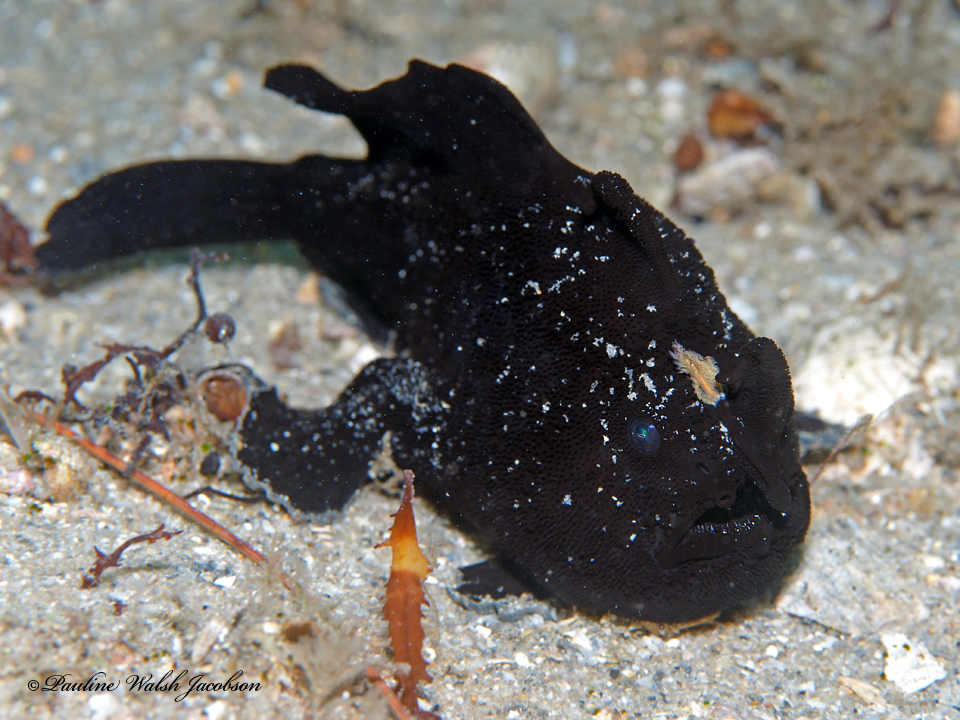

Conservation status
- Least Concern (IUCN 3.1)

Scientific classification
- Kingdom: Animalia
- Phylum: Chordata
- Class: Actinopterygii
- Division: Teleostei
- Order: Lophiiformes
- Family: Antennariidae
- Genus: Antennarius
- Species: A. scaber

Binomial name
- Antennarius scaber (Cuvier, 1817)

Synonyms
- List: Chironectes scaber Cuvier, 1817; Phrynelox scaber (Cuvier, 1817); Ostracion knorrii Walbaum, 1792; Chironectes tenebrosus Poey, 1852; Antennarius tenebrosus (Poey, 1852); Lophius spectrum Gronow, 1854; Antennarius nuttingii Garman, 1896; Antennarius teleplanus Fowler, 1912; Antennarius cubensis Borodin, 1928

= Antennarius scaber =

Species of fish

Antennarius scaber, the splitlure frogfish or striated frogfish, is a species of marine ray-finned fish belonging to the family Antennariidae, the frogfishes. This species is found in the Western Atlantic Ocean and was previously considered to be a synonym of Antennarius striatus.

== Taxonomy ==
Antennarius scaber was first formally described in 1817 as Chironectes scaber by the French zoologist Georges Cuvier with its type locality given as the Martinique. A. scaber was regarded as a synonym of A. striatus of the eastern Atlantic, Indian and Pacific Oceans but molecular and morphological evidence has confirmed that A scaber is a valid species. Within the genus Antennarius this species belongs to the striatus species group. The 5th edition of Fishes of the World classifies the genus Antennarius in the family Antennariidae within the suborder Antennarioidei within the order Lophiiformes, the anglerfishes.

== Etymology ==
Antennarius scaber has the genus name Antennarius which suffixes -ius to antenna, an allusion to first dorsal spine being adapted into a tentacle on the snout used as a lure to attract prey. The specific name scaber, means "rough", an allusion to the rough skin with its covering of spinules.

== Description ==
Antennarius scaber has a globose rather compressed body with eyes on the sides of head. It has a very large, upwardly pointung mouth with numerous small teeth. The small round gill opening is located below and behind the base of the pectoral fin. There are three dorsal spines, the first is the Illicium which is tipped with an esca or "lure" made up of two vermiform appendages. The second dorsal spine is roughly straight and is connected to head by a smooth membrane. The third dorsal spine is movable and is not fixed to the skin. The limb-like pectoral fins have a joint that resembles an elbow and is broadly connected to body. There are 7 soft rays in the anal fin and the dorsal fin has 12 soft rays. There is a caudal peduncle and the dorsal and anal fins are not joined to the caudal fin. The rough skin of the body has a dense covering of bifurcated spinules. The overall colour varies through yellow, orange, green, brown, grey, or almost white. There are irregular, slender brown bars and spots on the head, body and fins with dark discontinuous lines radiating out from the eye.

== Distribution and habitat ==
Antennarius scaber is found in the western Atlantic Ocean where it occurs as far north as New Jersey and Bermuda south through the Bahamas, the Gulf of Mexico and throughout the island groups of the Caribbean to the southernmost coast of Brazil. This species is found at depths between the surface and 219 m (719 ft) but is typically found at depths shallower than 30 m (98 ft) on reefs and sandy and muddy substrates.

== Biology ==
Anetnnarius scaber, like other frogfishes, is an ambush predator using the illicium with its esca on the tip to lure prey within striking distance of the mouth. Fishes in the genus Antennarius lay their eggs in gelatinous masses called rafts or veils. The eggs remain within this mass until they hatch.
