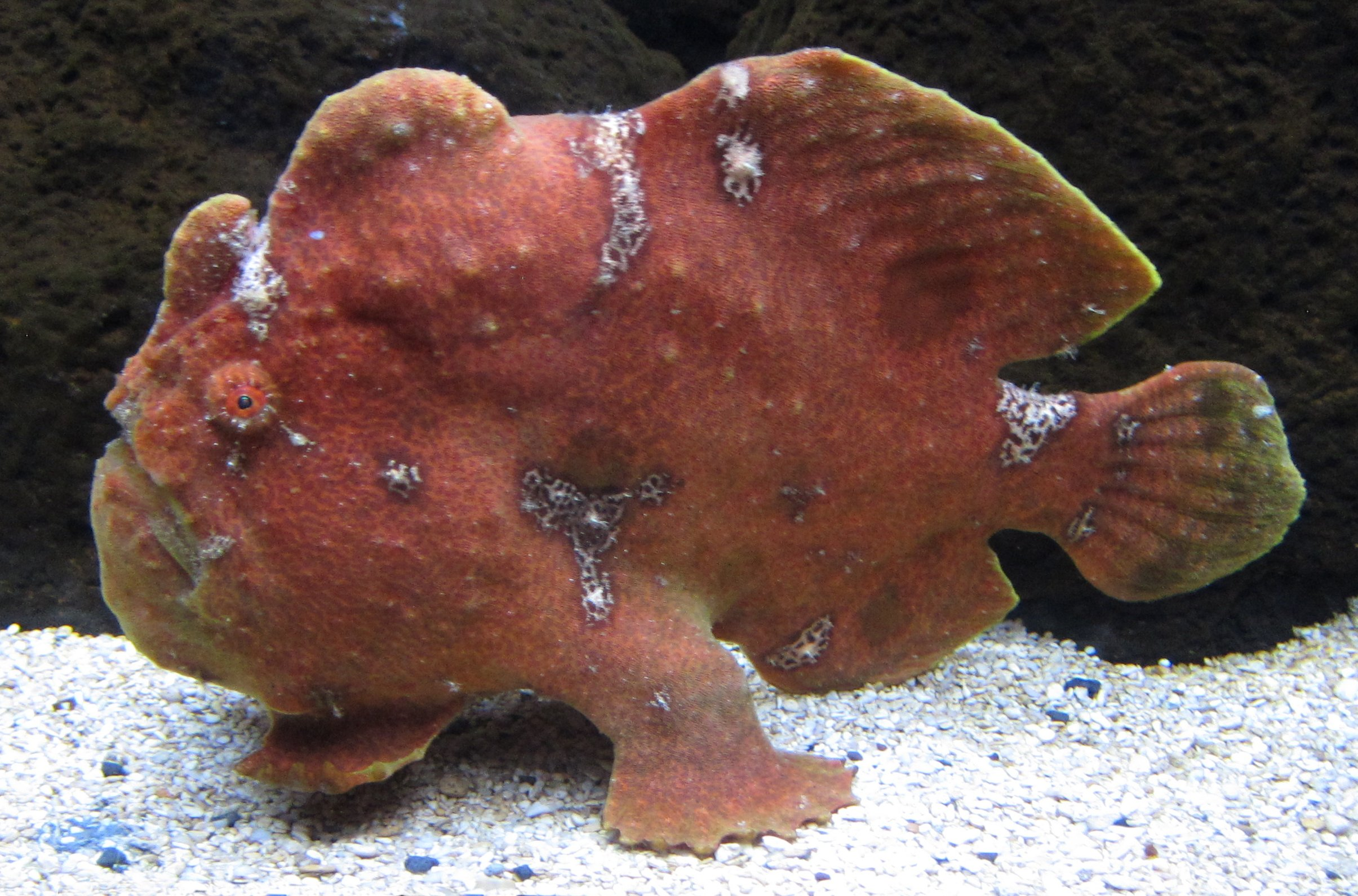
- Commerson's frogfish (A. commerson)

Scientific classification
- Kingdom: Animalia
- Phylum: Chordata
- Class: Actinopterygii
- Order: Lophiiformes
- Family: Antennariidae
- Subfamily: Antennariinae
- Genus: Antennarius; Daudin, 1816

Type species
- Lophius chironectes Latreille, 1804

Species
- see text.

Synonyms
- Antennarius Cuvier (ex Commerson), 1816; Chironectes Cuvier, 1817 (Unavailable); Saccarius Günther, 1861; Phrynelox Whitley, 1931; Triantennatus Schultz, 1957; Uniantennatus Schultz, 1957; Phymatophryne Le Danois, 1964

= Antennarius =

Genus of fishes

Antennarius is a genus of anglerfish belonging to the family Antennariidae, the frogfishes. The fishes in this genus are found in warmer parts of the Atlantic, Indian, and Pacific Oceans.

== Taxonomy ==
Antennarius was first proposed as a genus in 1816 by French naturalist François Marie Daudin with Lophius chironectes being designated as its type species in 1856 by Pieter Bleeker. Lophius chironectes was a binomial authored twice, once by Bernard Germain de Lacépède in 1798 and again by Pierre André Latreille in 1804, though which is the type species of this genus is not clear. Catalog of Fishes lists Latreille's name as a synonym of A. pictus and states that this taxon is probably the correct type species. Some authorities classify this genus in the subfamily Antennariinae within the family Antennariidae. However, the 5th edition of Fishes of the World does not recognise subfamilies within the Antennariidae, classifying the family within the suborder Antennarioidei in the order Lophiiformes, the anglerfishes.

== Etymology ==
Antennarius suffixes -ius to antenna, an allusion to first dorsal spine being adapted into a tentacle on the snout used as a lure to attract prey.

== Species ==
Antennarius contains these recognised valid species:

Image	Scientific name	Common name	Distribution
	Antennarius biocellatus G. Cuvier, 1817	Brackish-water frogfish	Indonesia, New Guinea, the Solomons, the Philippines and Taiwan.
	Antennarius commerson Lacépède, 1798	Commerson's frogfish	Red Sea and South Africa to Panama, north to southern Japan and the Hawaiian Islands, south to the Lord Howe and the Society islands
	Antennarius hispidus Bloch & J. G. Schneider, 1801	Shaggy frogfish	East Africa, India, and Malaysia to the Moluccas, north to Taiwan, south to northern Australia.
	Antennarius indicus L. P. Schultz, 1964	Indian frogfish	East Africa, Gulf of Aden, and Seychelles to southeast India and Sri Lanka, north to the Gulf of Oman.
	Antennarius maculatus Desjardins, 1840	Warty frogfish	Maldives and Mauritius to Indonesia, Singapore, the Philippines, Papua New Guinea and the Solomon Islands.
	Antennarius multiocellatus Valenciennes, 1837	Longlure frogfish	Bermuda to the Bahamas, throughout the Caribbean, and along the coast of Central America to Colombia, Venezuela and Brazil as far south as Salvador. Antilles
	Antennarius pardalis Valenciennes, 1837	Leopard frogfish	Senegal to Congo
	Antennarius pauciradiatus L. P. Schultz, 1957	Dwarf frogfish	Bahamas, off Belize, Colombia, Bermuda, Puerto Rico, Antigua, Tortugas and off the Atlantic coast of Florida.
	Antennarius pictus G. Shaw, 1794	Painted frogfish	Red Sea and East Africa to the Hawaiian and Society islands.
	Antennarius randalli G. R. Allen, 1970	Randall's frogfish	Japan, Taiwan, Philippines, Moluccas, Fiji, Marshall Islands and Easter Island.
	Antennarius scaber Cuvier, 1817		Western Atlantic. Off the coast of New Jersey (USA), Bermuda, Bahamas, Gulf of Mexico and throughout the island groups of the Caribbean to the southernmost coast of Brazil.
	Antennarius striatus G. Shaw, 1794	Striated frogfish	African coast, from Senegal to Southwest Africa, with a single record from St. Helena. Red Sea and the East African coast to the Society and Hawaiian islands, north to Japan, south to Australia and New Zealand.

The fossil species †Antennarius monodi Carnevale & Pietsch, 2006 from the latest Miocene (Messinian) of Algeria was previously placed in this genus. However, more recent studies have suggested that it actually belongs to the genus Fowlerichthys.

== Characteristics ==
Antennarius frogfishes have a slightly compressed rather globose body. The head has no spines on it, the eyes are located on the sides of the head and there is a large upwardly pointing mouth with numerous small teeth. The illicium has a distinct esca, or lure, and if there are spinule these are either at the base or along the front edge. The third dorsal spine is movable and is not embedded in the skin. These is a small round gill opening, to the rear and underneath the base of the pectoral fin, these are limb-like with a joint which resembles an elbow and the base is broadly joined to the body. They have a caudal peduncle but this is not connected to the dorsal and anal fin. The pelvic fins are short, with 5 fin rays, 4 simple and one branched. The rough skin on the body has a covering of closely set bifurcated spinules. The largest species in the genus is Commerson's frogfish (A. commerson) which has a maximum published total length 45 cm (18 in), while the smallest is Randall's frogfish (A. randalli) with a maximum standard length of 8 cm (3.1 in).

== Distribution and habitat ==
Antennarius frogfishes are cosmopolitan in coastal waters in tropical and subtropical oceans, although they are most diverse in the Indo-West Pacific region. One species, A. biocellatus, is often found in brackish, or even fresh, waters but they are mostly marine, largely in shallow water and are found on a variety of substrates.
