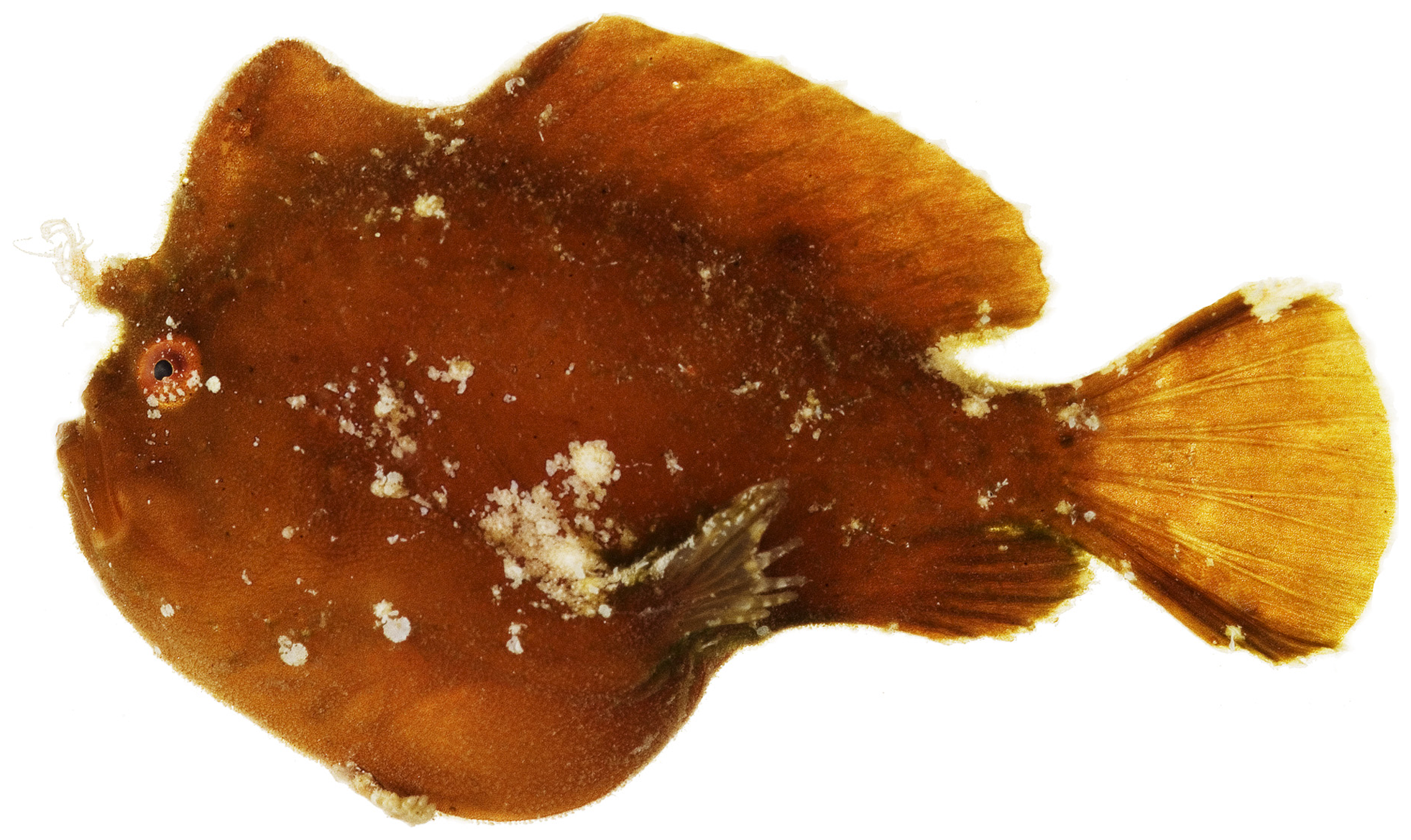

Conservation status
- Least Concern (IUCN 3.1)

Scientific classification
- Kingdom: Animalia
- Phylum: Chordata
- Class: Actinopterygii
- Order: Lophiiformes
- Family: Antennariidae
- Genus: Antennarius
- Species: A. pauciradiatus

Binomial name
- Antennarius pauciradiatus Schultz, 1957

= Antennarius pauciradiatus =

Species of fish

Antennarius pauciradiatus, the dwarf frogfish or smallspot frogfish, is a species of marine ray-finned fish belonging to the family Antennariidae, the frogfishes. This species is found in the western Atlantic.

== Taxonomy ==
Antennarius pauciradiatus was first formally described in 1957 by the American ichthyologist Leonard Peter Schultz with its type locality given as Palm Beach, Florida. Within the genus Antennarius the dwarf frogfish belongs to the pauciradiatus species group, along with Randall's frogfish (A. randalli). The 5th edition of Fishes of the World classifies the genus Antennarius in the family Antennariidae within the suborder Antennarioidei within the order Lophiiformes, the anglerfishes.

== Etymology ==
Antennarius pauciradiatus has the genus name Antennarius which suffixes -ius to antenna, an allusion to first dorsal spine being adapted into a tentacle on the snout used as a lure to attract prey. The specific name pauciradiatus combines pauci-, meaning few, and radiates, which means rayed, an allusion to the fewer rays in the pectoral fin in comparison to the Fowlerichthys species that were assumed to be its congeners when it was described.

== Description ==
Antennarius pauciradiatus has a globose, slightly compressed body. The large mouth points upwards and has many small, sharp teeth. The small round opening to the gills is located under and to the rear of the pectoral fin. There are 3 dorsal spines, the first is the "fishing rod", or illicium, which is markedly shorter than the second and is tipped by the lure, or esca, an oval shape with many filaments that resemble tentacles. The second spine is connected to the head and part of the third spine by a membrane. This membrane includes a pocket into which the esca can be folded. The long, curved third spine is moveable and is not connected to the head by a membrane. The pectoral fins are limb-like and having a joint that resembles an elbow, the lobe of the fin is widely connected to the body. There is a dense covering of bifurcated spinules on the body. The overall colour is tan and there are two small brown spots on the dorsal fin. The dwarf frogfish has a maximum published total length of 6.3 cm (2.5 in).

== Distribution and habitat ==
Antennarius pauciradiatus is found in the Western Atlantic Ocean where it is distributed from Bermuda, Florida and the Bahamas south through the Caribbean Sea to Colombia. It is found at depths between 6 and 73 m (20 and 240 ft) on reefs and rock substrates. It may have been extirpated from Bermuda due to habitat loss.
