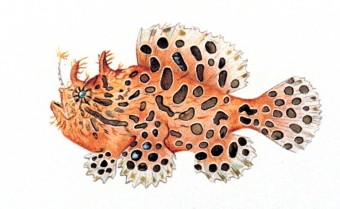

Conservation status
- Least Concern (IUCN 3.1)

Scientific classification
- Kingdom: Animalia
- Phylum: Chordata
- Class: Actinopterygii
- Order: Lophiiformes
- Family: Antennariidae
- Genus: Antennarius
- Species: A. striatus

Binomial name
- Antennarius striatus (G. Shaw, 1794)

= Striated frogfish =

Species of fish

The striated frogfish or hairy frogfish (Antennarius striatus) is a species of marine ray-finned fish belonging to the family Antennariidae, the frogfishes. This species is found in the Indo-Pacific and eastern Atlantic Ocean.

== Taxonomy ==
The striated frogfish was first formally described in 1794 as Lophius striatus by the English biologist George Shaw with its type locality given as Tahiti in the Society Islands. Within the genus Antennarius, this species belongs to the striatus species group. The 5th edition of Fishes of the World classifies the genus Antennarius in the family Antennariidae within the suborder Antennarioidei within the order Lophiiformes, the anglerfishes.

== Etymology ==
The striated frogfish has the genus name Antennarius (which adds ius after antenna), an allusion to its first dorsal spine being adapted into a tentacle on the snout used as a lure to attract prey. The specific name striatus (meaning "striped" or "streaked") refers to the numerous black streaks on the body of this fish.

== Description ==
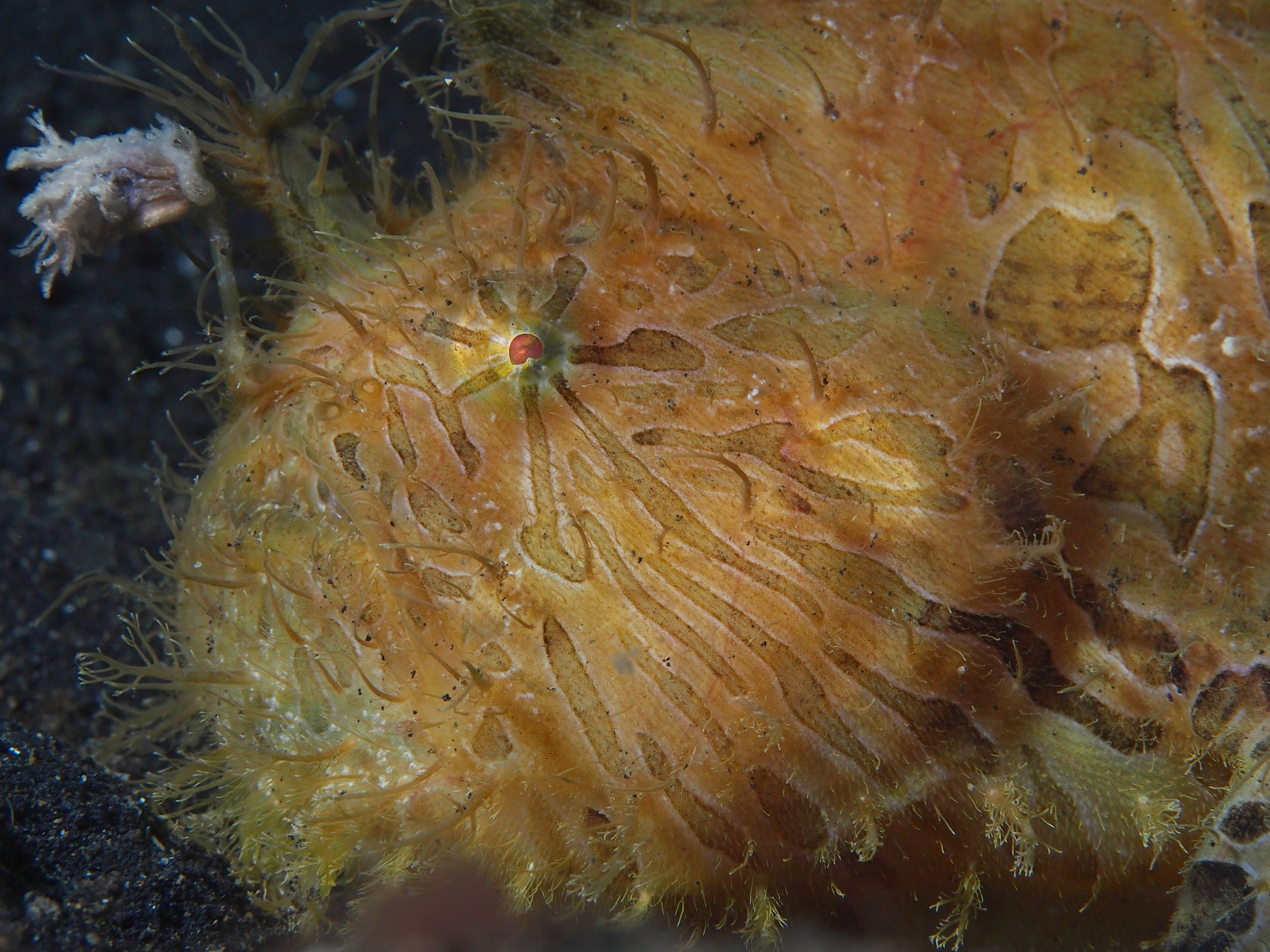
Striated frogfish gather during the mating period but do not tolerate each other after fertilization.

This small fish grows up to 22 cm (8.7 in) long. Like other members of its family, it has a rounded, extensible body, and its soft skin is covered with irregularly-arranged dermal spinules resembling hairs. Its large mouth is forwardly extensible, allowing it to swallow prey as large as itself. The coloring of its body is extremely variable because individual fish tend to match their living environments.

Frogfishes have the capacity to change coloration and pigment pattern, taking only a few weeks to adapt. The dominant coloration varies from yellow to brownish-orange, passing through a range of shades, but it can also be green, gray, brown, almost white, or even completely black without any pattern. Body and fins can be marked with roughly parallel dark stripes or elongated blotches, some with rays radiating outward from the eye.

The first dorsal spine, the illicium, tips forward, and is modified for use like a fishing rod. Its tip has a characteristic worm-like esca (lure) which, when waved, attracts unsuspecting prey. The dorsal spine is composed of two to seven elongated appendages. The lure is a way to easily distinguish A. striatus from Antennarius hispidus, which otherwise has similar physical characteristics (stripes, coloration, cutaneous appendages) and with which it is often confused. The illicium has the same length as the second dorsal spine and it is often darkly banded. The second dorsal spine is practically vertical and is movable, while the third one is bent towards the back of the body. They are well separated from each other and also from the dorsal fin.

The pectoral fins are angled, and with the pelvic fins, allow the frogfish to "walk" on the sea bottom and to keep a stable position for ambush.

== Distribution ==
The striated frogfish is found in the tropical and subtropical waters from the Indian Ocean to the center of the Pacific Ocean, and in the Atlantic Ocean on the western coast of Africa and from the New Jersey coast to the southern Brazilian coast including the Gulf of Mexico and the Caribbean. The only waters these fish are not found in are the Mediterranean and the Arctic. Williams (1989) and Arnold and Pietsch (2012), however, considered Antennarius striatus a species complex, and the putative synonym Antennarius scaber is apparently a distinct species from A. striatus in having a bifid esca and 11–12 pectoral rays.

== Habitat ==
This species inhabits shallow, sandy areas or rocky and coral reefs to deep waters. It can be found from the surface to 210 m (690 ft) with average occurrence at 40 m (130 ft) deep. They often mimic coral or sponges around them to blend in with the environment known as cryptic coloration.

As general daily temperatures continue to rise, this poses a big problem for the oceans and their inhabitants that rely on the ecosystems within to survive. The frogfish is no exception, as they are dependent on coral reefs to blend in and prey on smaller fish. After a frogfish has been subjected to a certain environment, they are able to take in their settings and change color over the span of a few weeks to blend in with the surroundings. With the oceans gradually becoming warmer, their pH levels are lowering (becoming more acidic), causing the waters to hold less oxygen. This is greatly expressed in the coral reefs in regard to coral bleaching where habitats are being lost daily. These acidic conditions bleach the coral, causing it to lose all color. As coral loses its color, the frogfish must adapt and overcome or become more vulnerable to predators. This is seen through the species Antennarius maculatus where the frogfish has changed to a white color in order to blend in with the bleached coral in the Indian Ocean.

== Behaviour ==
External videos
- The Insatiable Hairy Frogfish – YouTube
- Striated Frogfish Mating – YouTube

As with all frogfishes, A. striatus is a voracious carnivore which will devour all right-sized prey that pass within reach, usually other fish, but sometimes even its own kind. It can swallow prey its own size.

Like other members of its family, it has a benthic and solitary lifestyle. They gather during mating period, but do not tolerate each other any more after the act of fertilization. The family Antennariidae use a unique form of locomotion which includes a jet type like propulsion that involves breathing. Water is taken in from the mouth and expelled through tube like gill openings behind the pectoral fins that propel the fish forward by performing opercular exhalations. The family generally has a globulous body shape with a large mouth upturned in the front of the body. This modification of increased oral cavity and reduced gill openings combined with pulsed water jet like propulsion expelled from breathing allow the fish to propel itself along the floor. They also have a unique jointed pectoral and pelvic fins that allow them to walk along the floor using their anterior dorsal fin in conjunction with their anal tail. Their fins are not modified for actual swimming therefore they remain benthic on the ocean floor. While frogfish have the ability to take in their surroundings and camouflage, they also have the ability to express batesian mimicry where they mimic other dangerous species such as the sea anemone to prevent predators from attacking. An example of such is frogfishes mimicking sea urchins resting on the floor. These fish also have a defense mechanism for when they are found by predators which includes swelling their body with water and remaining inflated to make swallowing difficult. Frogfish are carnivorous, mainly feeding on a diet of small marine fish and crustaceans, but have been known to perform in acts of cannibalism. A. striatus is one of the rare species of this family that exhibits a chemical attractant as well when fishing which is mainly used at night when light is unavailable. It is also observed that the esca is very susceptible to predators therefore the fish rolls it up close to the body when not hunting, and in some species, such as the A. pauciradiatus and A. randalli they have a pocket like structure they can place the esca in between the second and third dorsal spine. Frogfish have one of the fastest eating methods known in the animal kingdom, the fish lacks any teeth and uses suction to inhale its food whole and live. They expand their oral cavity by lowering the lower jaw and extending the upper. The trick remains in gaining the preys attention by moving their illicium usually in an arch like or wiggly fashion to mimic that of a small distressed animal. Once the frogfish can bring their prey close enough, they are able to inhale their prey in six thousandths of a second.

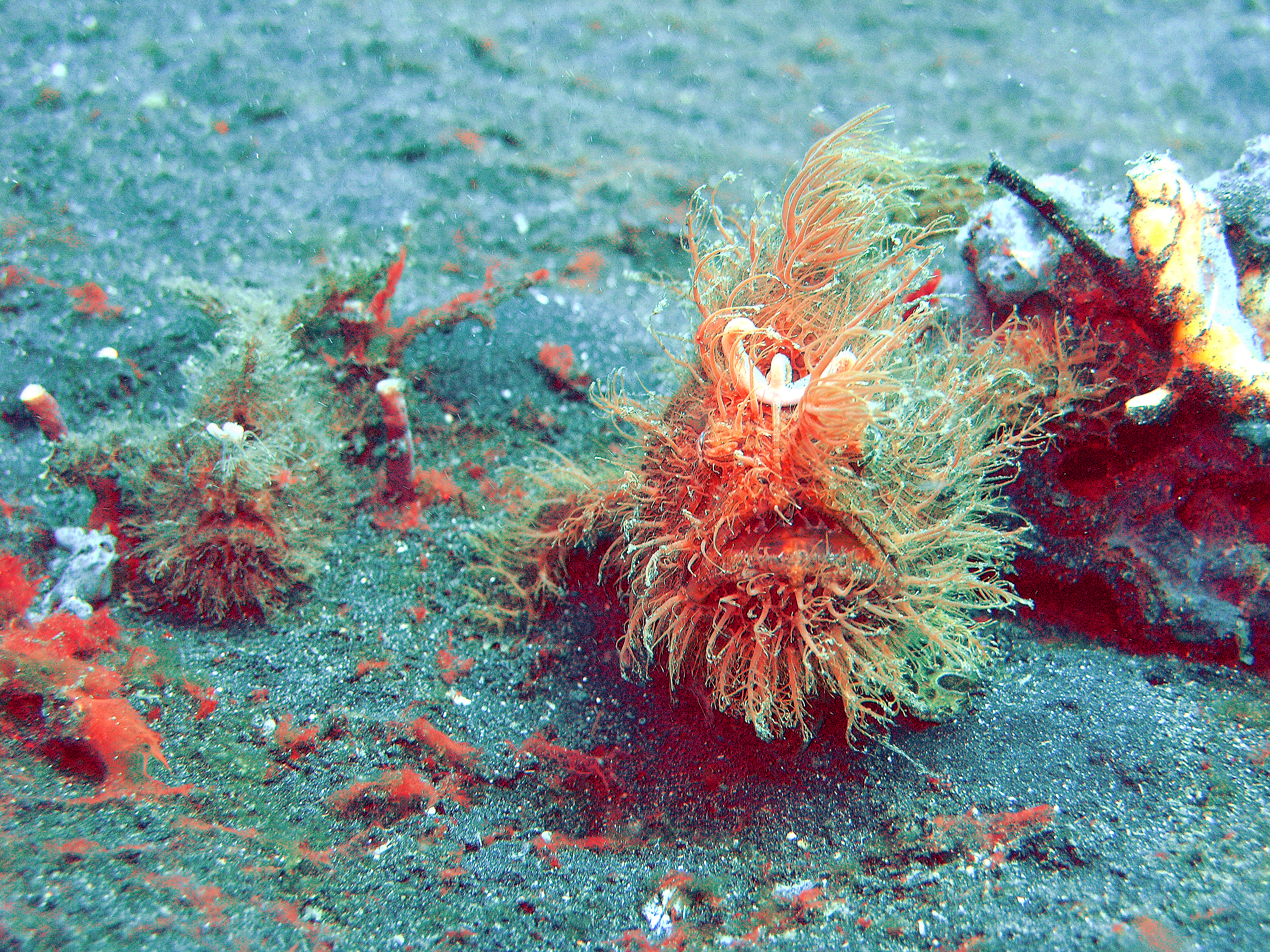

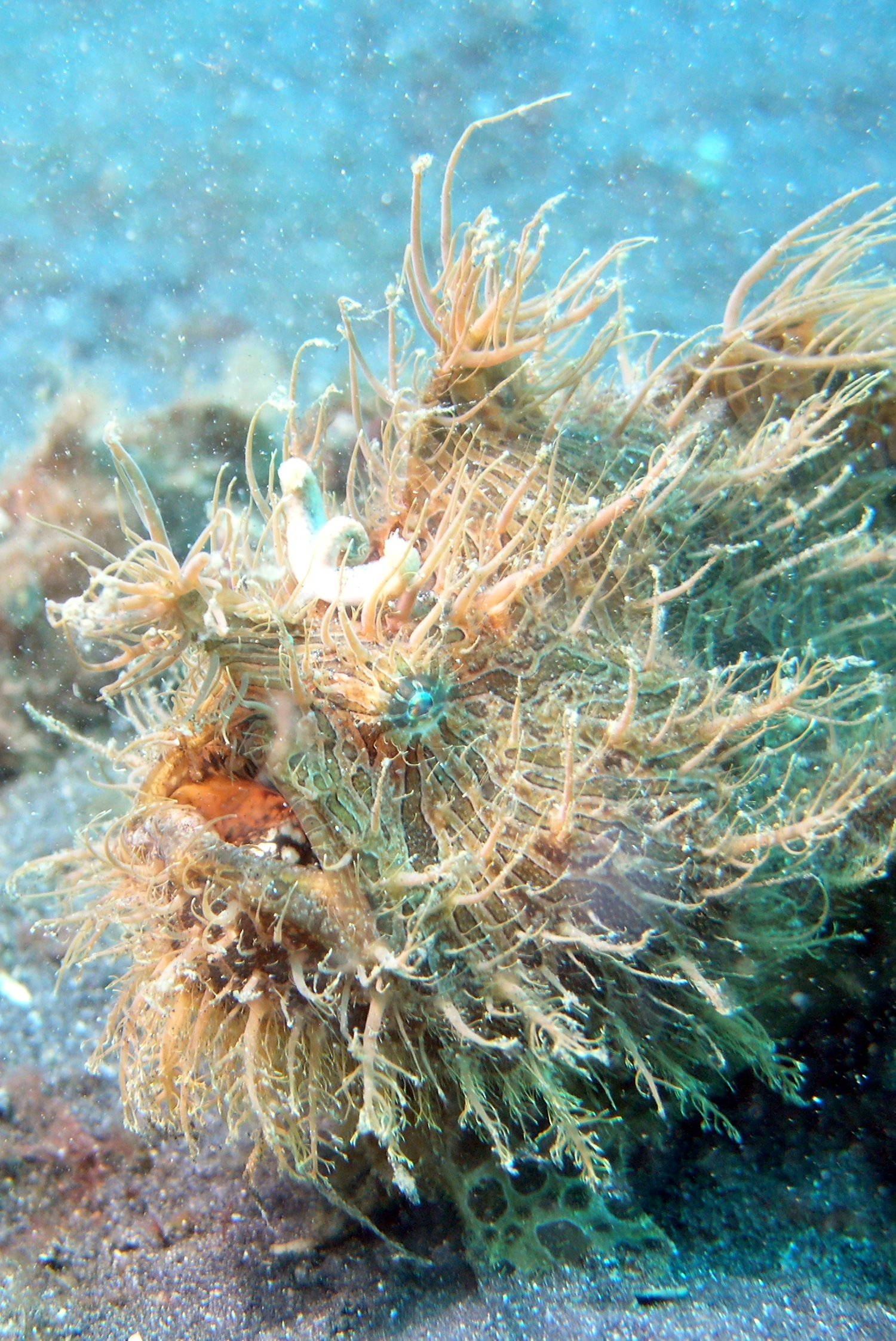

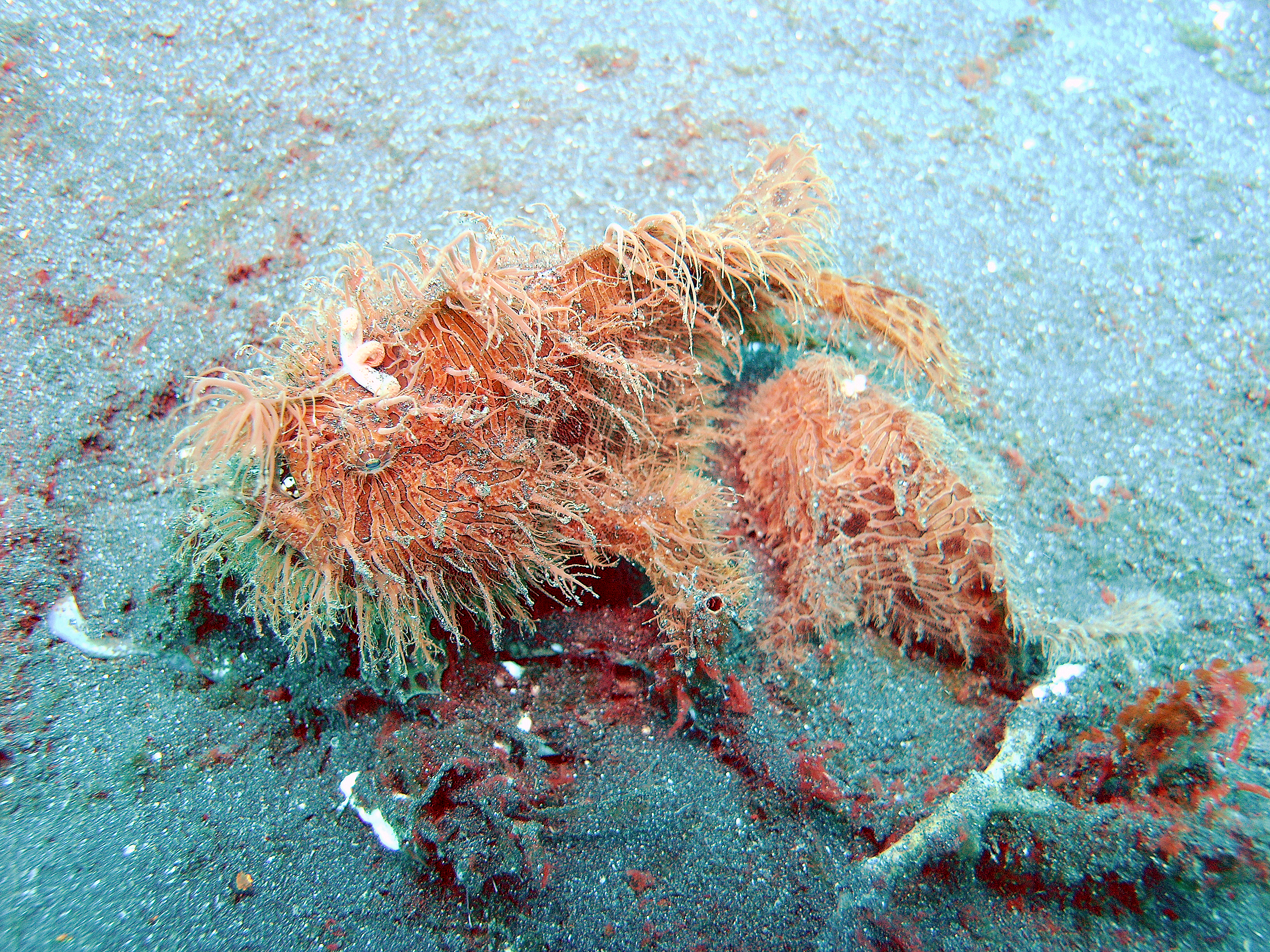

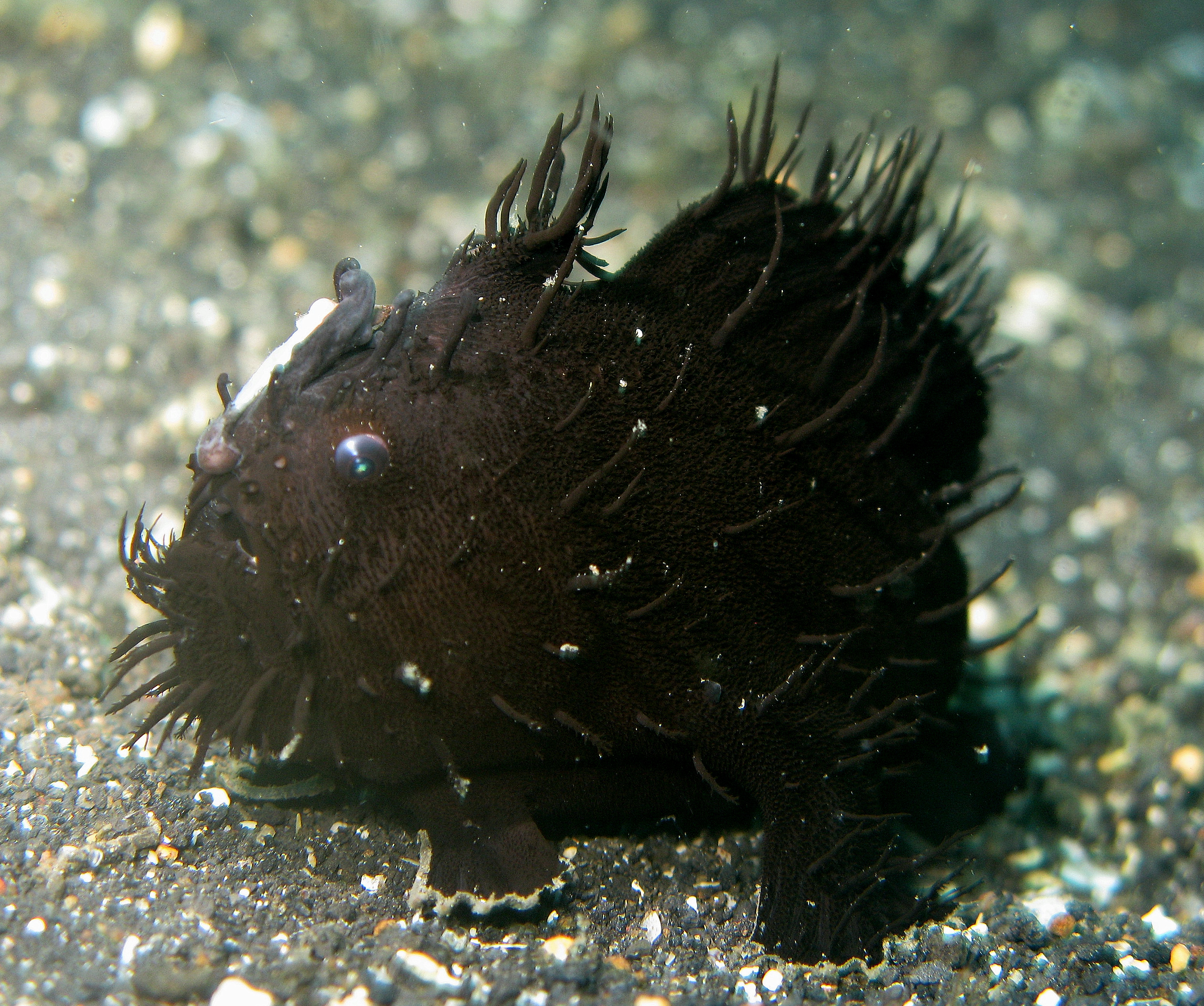

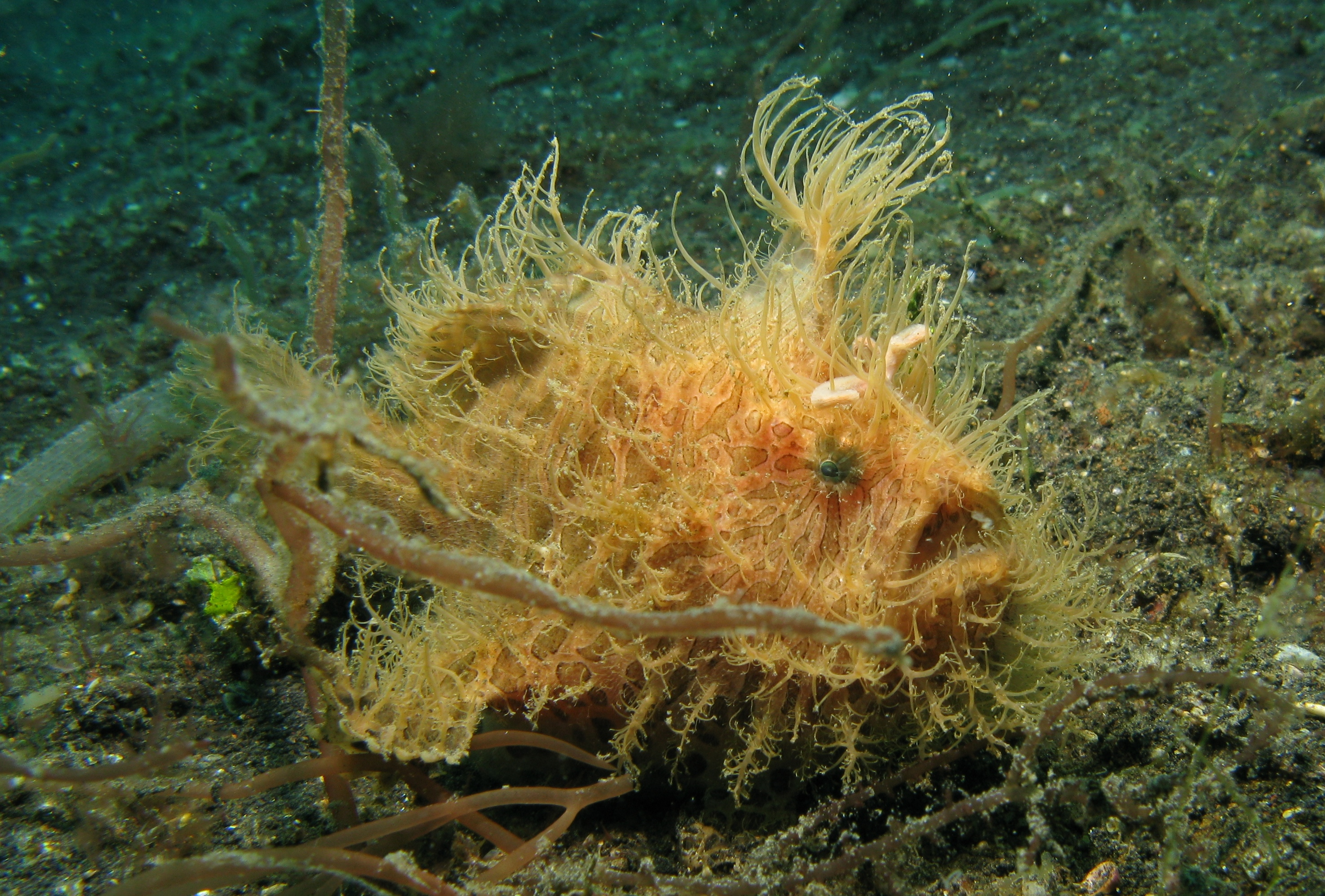
