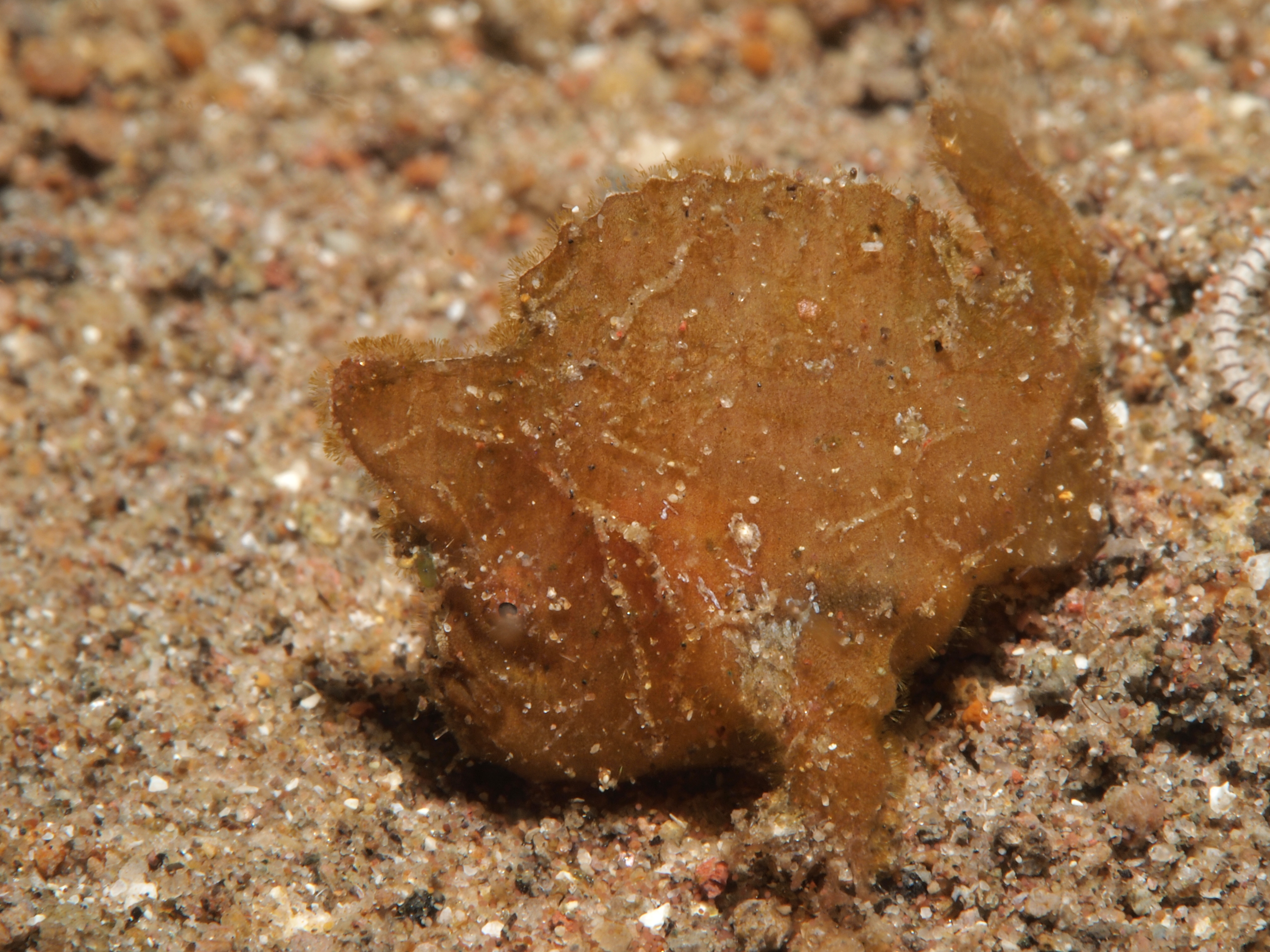

Conservation status
- Least Concern (IUCN 3.1)

Scientific classification
- Kingdom: Animalia
- Phylum: Chordata
- Class: Actinopterygii
- Order: Lophiiformes
- Family: Antennariidae
- Genus: Antennarius
- Species: A. randalli

Binomial name
- Antennarius randalli G. R. Allen, 1970

= Randall's frogfish =

Species of fish

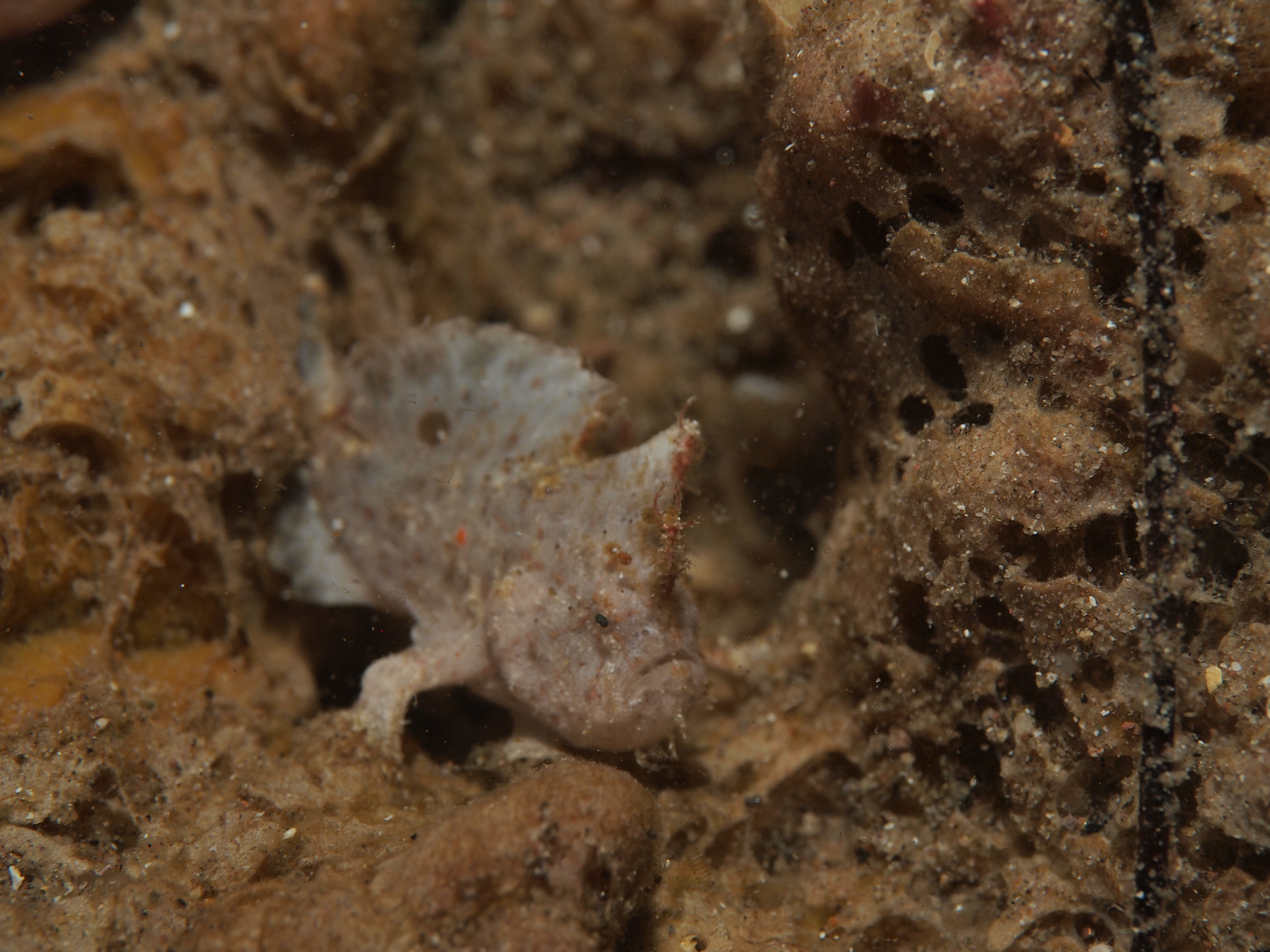
Randalls's frogfish uses its pelvic fins to walk on the bottom and keep a stable position for ambush

Randall's frogfish (Antennarius randalli) is a species of marine ray-finned fish belonging to the family Antennariidae, the frogfishes. This species is found in the Indo-Pacific region.

== Taxonomy ==
Randall's frogfish was first formally described in 1970 by the American ichthyologist Gerald R. Allen with its type locality given as off Motu Tautara, Easter Island. Within the genus Antennarius Randall's frogfish belongs to the pauciradiatus species group, along with A. pauciradiatus. The 5th edition of Fishes of the World classifies the genus Antennarius in the family Antennariidae within the suborder Antennarioidei within the order Lophiiformes, the anglerfishes.

== Etymology ==
Randall's frogfish has the genus name Antennarius which suffixes -ius to antenna, an allusion to first dorsal spine being adapted into a tentacle on the snout used as a lure to attract prey. The specific name honours John Ernest Randall of the Bishop Museum who enabled Allen to participate in the 1969 expedition to Easter Island on which the holotype was collected.

== Description ==
Randall's frogfish has a short illicium with thin filaments and an esca, or "lure", which is split into several thin filaments. There are two white spots on the caudal fin and other whiote spots are to the rear of the eye, near the pectoral fin and one at the base of the dorsal fin. The second and third dorsal spines are connected by a membrane, this membrane forms a pocket for the esca. The dorsal fin is supported by 12 or 13 soft rays while the anal fin has 7 soft rays. This species has a maximum published standard length of 8 cm (3.1 in).

== Distribution and habitat ==
Randall's frogfish is found in the Indo-Pacific region. It has been recorded from the Cocos (Keeling) Islands, Indonesia and Papua New Guinea east as far as the Marquesas Islands and Easter Island, in 2020 it was recorded from the Gulf of Aqaba in the northern Red Sea. It is found from the surface down to depths of 53 m (174 ft) in rubble and rocky habitats and it is often found in association with coral reefs and algae.
