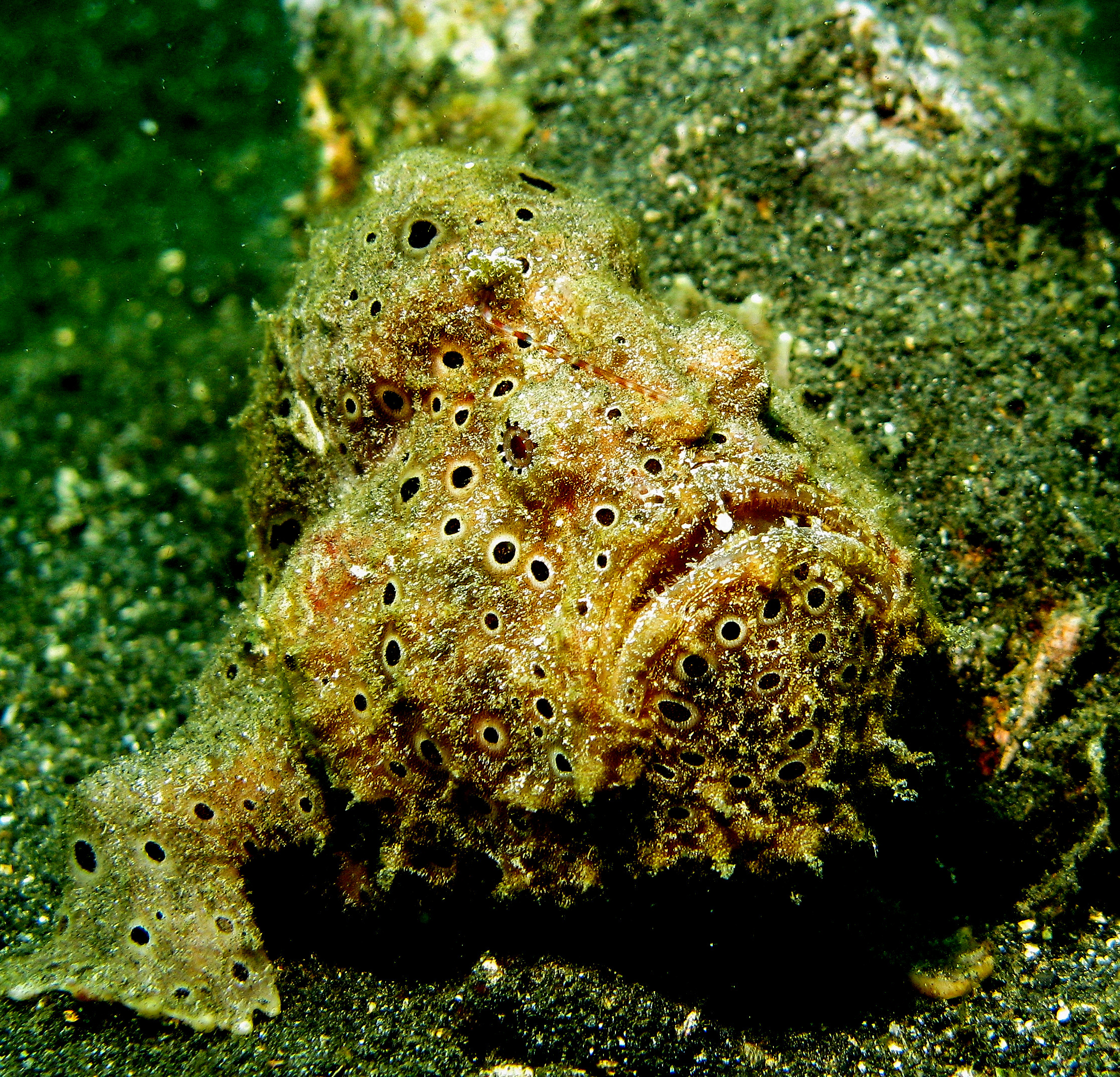

Conservation status
- Least Concern (IUCN 3.1)

Scientific classification
- Kingdom: Animalia
- Phylum: Chordata
- Class: Actinopterygii
- Order: Lophiiformes
- Family: Antennariidae
- Genus: Antennarius
- Species: A. pictus

Binomial name
- Antennarius pictus (Shaw, 1794)

Synonyms
- Lophius pictus Shaw, 1794; Lophius chironectes Latreille, 1804; Antennarius chironectes (Latreille, 1804); Chironectes verus Cloquet, 1817; Chironectes leprosus Eydoux & Souleyet, 1850; Antennarius leprosus (Eydoux & Souleyet, 1850); Antennarius polyophthalmus Bleeker, 1852; Antennarius horridus Bleeker, 1853; Lophiocharon horridus (Bleeker, 1853)

= Painted frogfish =

Species of fish

The painted frogfish (Antennarius pictus), or spotted frogfish, black angler or painted anglerfish is a species of marine ray-finned fish belonging to the family Antennariidae, the frogfishes. This species is found in the Indo-Pacific region.

== Taxonomy ==
The painted frogfish was first formally described as Lophius pictus in 1794 by the English biologist George Shaw with its type locality given as Tahiti in the Society Islands. Within the genus Antennarius the painted frogfish belongs to the pictus species group. The 5th edition of Fishes of the World classifies the genus Antennarius in the family Antennariidae within the suborder Antennarioidei within the order Lophiiformes, the anglerfishes.

== Etymology ==
The painted frogfish has the genus name Antennarius which suffixes -ius to antenna, an allusion to first dorsal spine being adapted into a tentacle on the snout used as a lure to attract prey. The specific name pictus means "painted", the body being described by Shaw as being brown marked with red-margined yellowish blotches.

== Description ==
The painted frogfish has a maximum published total length of 30 cm (12 in). Like other members of its family, it has a globulous, extensible body, with soft skin is covered with small dermal spinules. Its skin is covered partially with few, small, wart-like protuberances, some variably shaped, scab-like blotches and many small eye spots (ocelli) which look like sponges holes. Its large prognathous mouth allows it to consume prey its same size.

The coloring of the body is extremely variable because they always tend to match their living environments. Frogfishes have the capacity to change coloration and pigment pattern in few weeks. However, the dominant coloration goes from white to black, passing through a whole range of related nuances such as cream, pink, yellow, red, and brown, usually with circular eye spots darker than the background color and/or with saddles and blotches. Some specimens can easily be confused with Antennarius maculatus.

These characteristics can help to separate the two close species: usually, A. maculatus has red or orange margins on all fins, and sometimes a spike of the saddle blotch starts posterior to the eye, numerous warts on the skin, and few or no ocellis; A. pictus has also three eye spots on its caudal fin.

Juveniles can have a dark background color with small yellow spots.

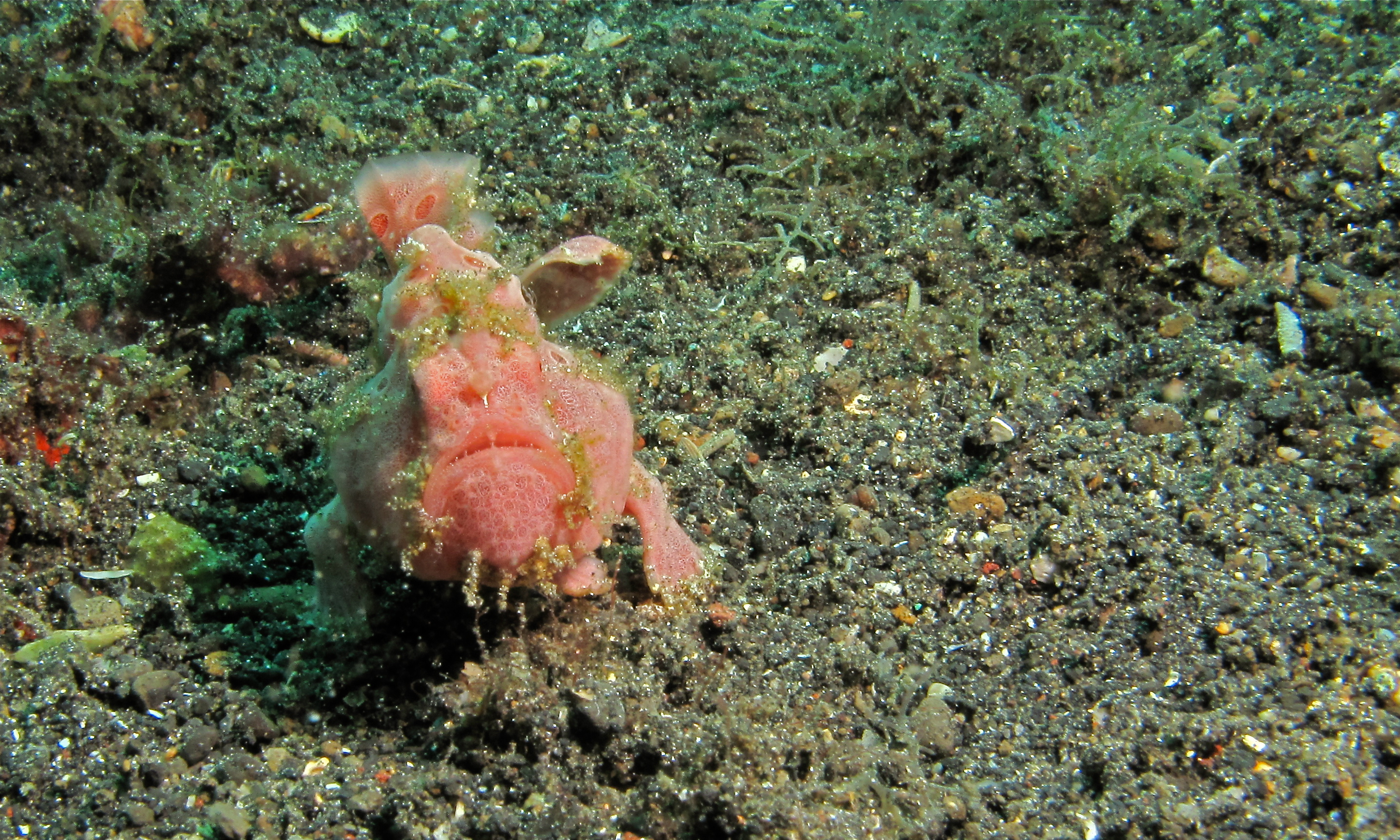
Pink coloration

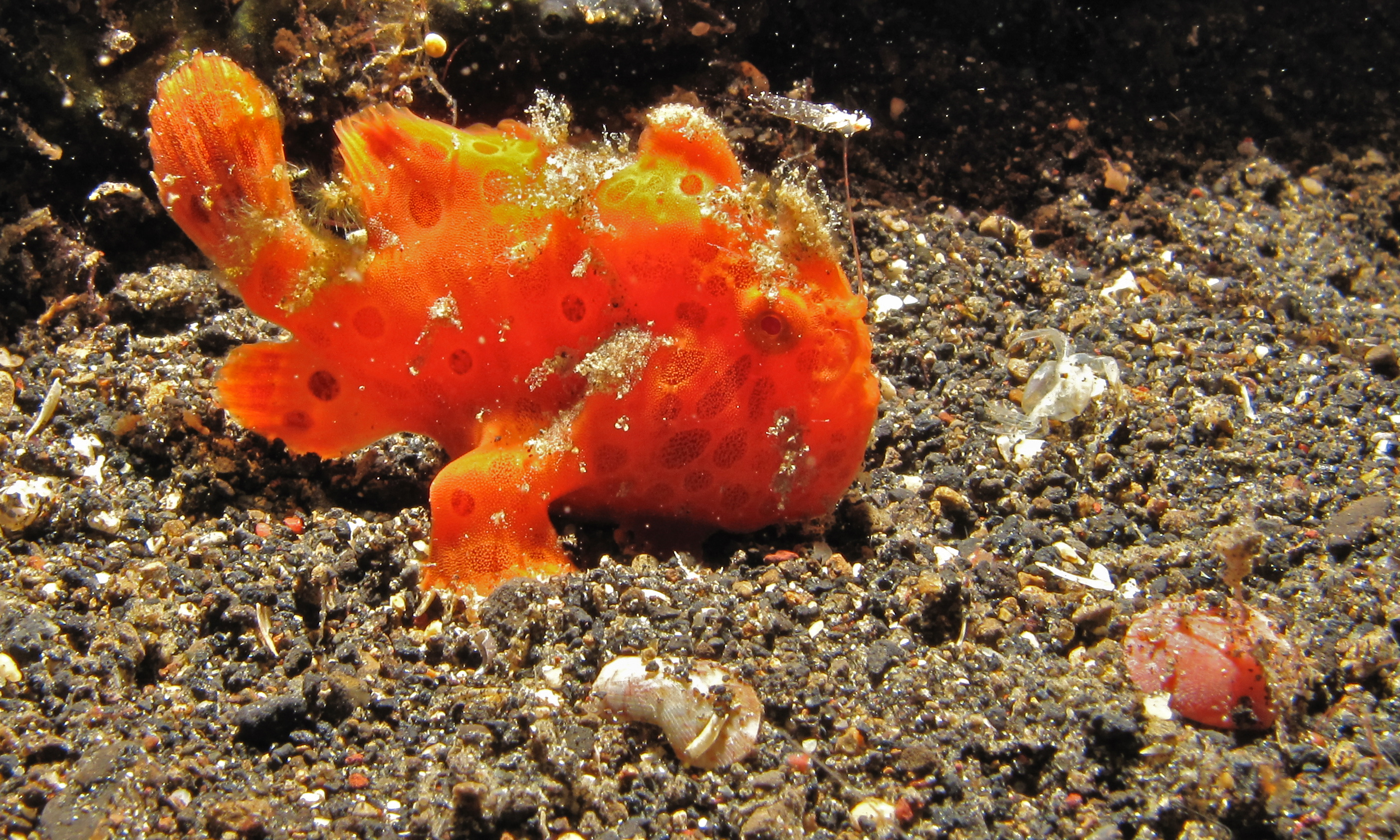
Orange coloration

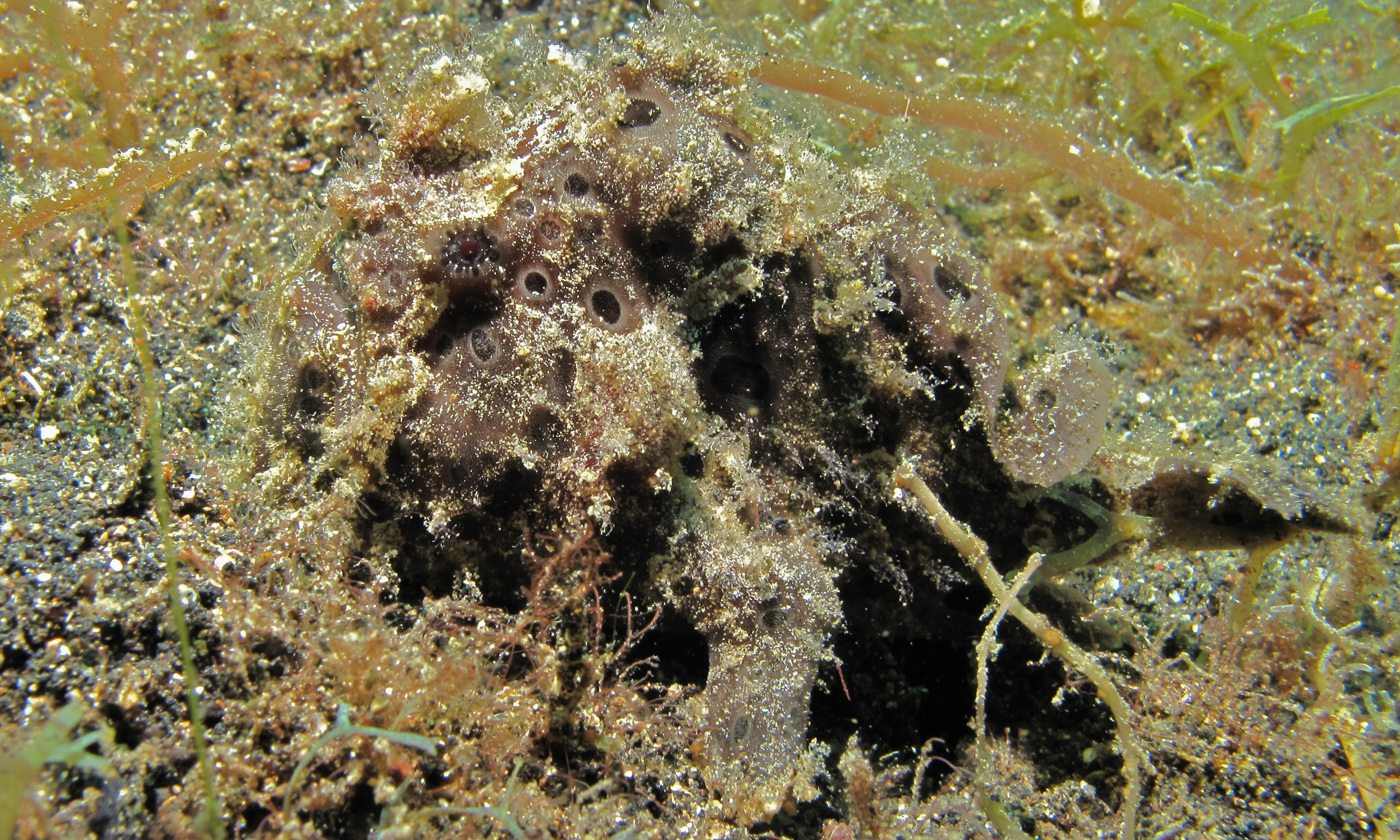
Brown coloration

The first dorsal spine, the illicium, is modified and is used as a fishing rod. Its extremity is endowed with a characteristic esca (lure), which looks like a small fish with a pinkish to brownish coloration. The illicium is twice the length of the second dorsal spine and its often darkly banded. The second dorsal spine is practically straight and is mobile, and the third one is bent towards the back of the body; both are membranously attached to the head. They are well separated from each other and from the dorsal fin.

The pectoral fins of frogfishes are angled and help, with the pelvic fins, to move the frogfish on the bottom and to keep a stable position for ambush.

== Distribution and habitat ==
The painted frogfish has a wide distribution in the tropical and subtropical waters from the Indo-Pacific area, along the eastern African coast between the Gulf of Aqaba south to the Aliwal Shoal off South Africa, east to Hawaii and the Society Islands, north to Jeju Island in Korea and the Ryukyu Islands and south to Western Australia's Houtman Abrolhos and Lord Howe Island. It is found on sheltered rocky and coral reefs, and adults are usually associated with sponges down to 75 m (246 ft) deep, with an average occurrence at 15 m (49 ft).

== Biology ==
The painted frogfish, like all frogfishes, is a voracious carnivore, an ambush predator, which can attack all small animals that pass within its "strike range", mainly fishes, but even sometimes congeners. Its prey can be close to its own size. Like other members of its family, the painted frogfish has a benthic and solitary lifestyle. They gather during mating period, but do not tolerate each other any more after the act of fertilization. The male can kill or eat the female if she stays too close. The sexes are separate, the eggs are laid in a gelatinous raft, they remain in this raft until they hatch, the larvae remain pelagic for the first two months of their lives. This species prefers to live on or near colorful sponges and have the ability to change their skin colour to camouflage themselves to their background.

== Utilization ==
The painted frogfish is of no interest to fisheries but is occasionally featured in the aquarium trade.
