= Spinule =

Small spines or thorns in biological or manmade structures

Spinules are small spines or thorns (vertebral columns) that are part of biological and manmade structures. The word originates from the Latin word spinula and is often used in botany and zoology.

The presence or absence of spinules, and their shape, can differentiate species and is used to describe and distinguish anatomical features. The development of spinules in the eye may be affected by dopamine, circadian rhythms, and exposure to light or dark environments, according to a studies of controlling mechanisms.

liquid-crystal displays (LCDs) can employ an anisotropic conducting film (ACF) that "consists of an epoxy resin and nickel particles with spinules".
