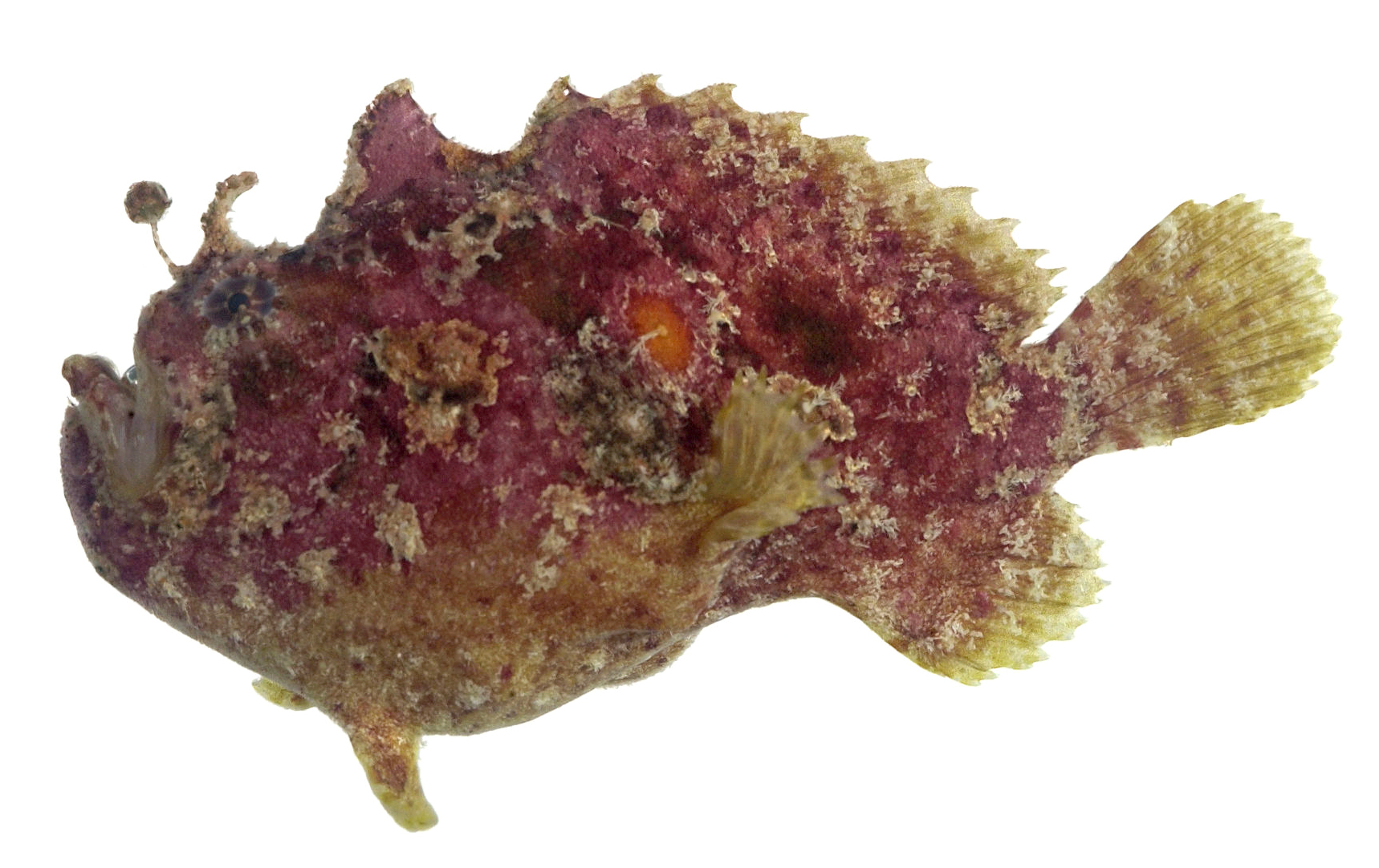

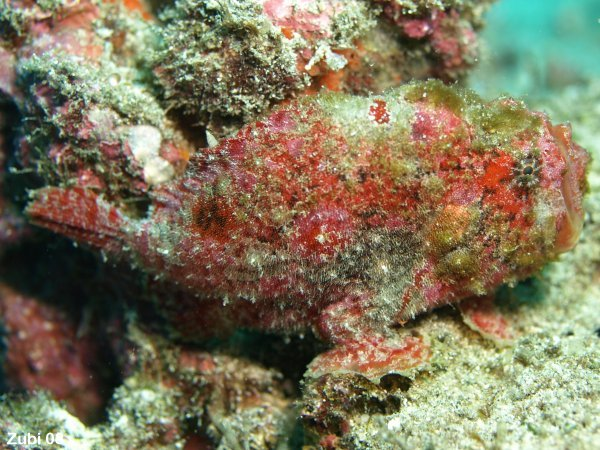

Conservation status
- Least Concern (IUCN 3.1)

Scientific classification
- Kingdom: Animalia
- Phylum: Chordata
- Class: Actinopterygii
- Division: Teleostei
- Order: Lophiiformes
- Family: Antennariidae
- Genus: Abantennarius
- Species: A. coccineus

Binomial name
- Abantennarius coccineus (Lesson, 1831)

Synonyms
- Chironectes coccineus Lesson, 1831; Antennarius coccineus (Lesson, 1831)

= Abantennarius coccineus =

Species of fish

Abantennarius coccineus, the scarlet or freckled frogfish, is a species of frogfish originally classified as Chironectes coccineus and Antennarius coccineus. It lives within tropical waters and has a central distribution being around Indo-East-Pacific areas — excluding Hawaii. The habitat of the scarlet frogfish is in the shallow zones of the ocean. It is found within reef areas, in rocky mounds or sponges where there are places for it to hide amongst from predators. The scarlet frogfish comes in a variety of colours, from tan and brown colours to bright reds and yellows and will grow to a maximum length of 13 centimetres (5.1 in). It can be identified taxonomically through its pectoral rays, the presence of dark patches that appear on its fins and body, along with its lack of distinctive tail base. The scarlet frogfish is not harmful to humans and is not caught by fisheries for consumption purposes, however it has been caught previously for studies relating to the abundance of reef-dwelling fish and as bycatch of shrimp trawling. Similar to other frogfish species, the scarlet frogfish is a predatory carnivore and exhibits a low degree of sociality, only interacting with other scarlet frogfish during their mating period.

== Taxonomy ==
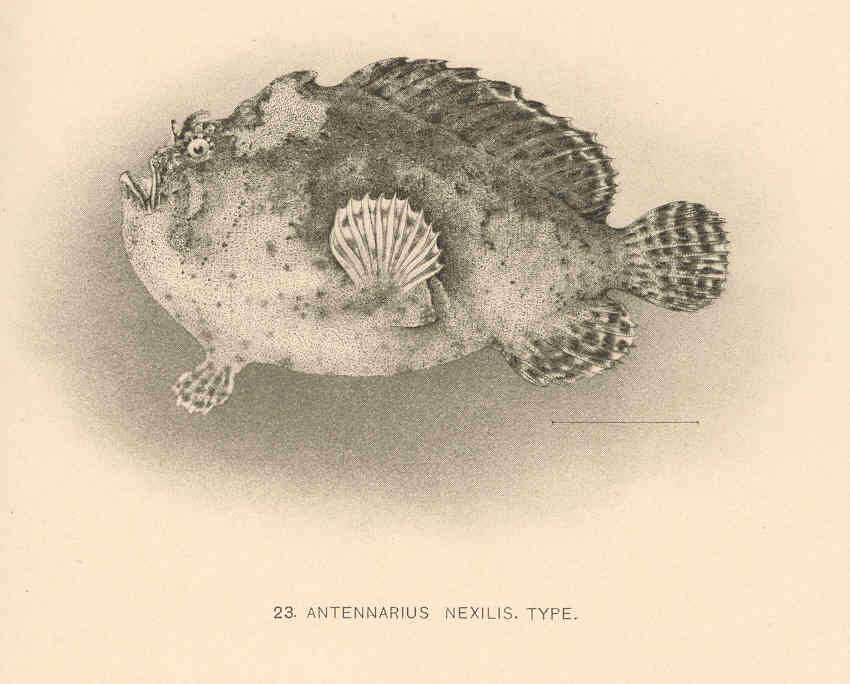
Diagram of Antennatus coccineus, previously classified Antennarius nexilis by John Otterbein Snyder

Abantennarius coccineus was originally classified as Chironectes coccineus by René Primevère Lesson in 1831. Lesson then went on to reclassify it as Antennarius coccineus in the same year. David Starr Jordan and Barton W. Evermann synonymised Antennatus coccineus (Antennarius coccineus at the time) with Antennatus drombus (Antennarius drombus at the time) in 1904, however it has since been separated due to the differences in the number of pectoral rays, varying colours of the esca and the abundance of small dark blotches on the body and fins. Antennarius coccineus was incorrectly named Antennarius nexilis by John Otterbein Snyder in 1904, followed by Antennarius stigmaticus by James Douglas Ogilby in 1912, and then Antennarius leucus by Henry W. Fowler in 1934. This was then followed by Abantennarius neocaledoniensis by Édouard Le Danois in 1964, Antennarius moai by Gerald R. Allen in 1970 and finally incorrectly named Antennarius immaculatus by Le Danoi in 1970. Whilst it has been the topic of numerous name changes since then, Antennarius coccineus was the most common name used up until 2012 when a combination of DNA profiling and Genetic analysis came out with the fish being incorrectly identified as being within the Antennarius genus and it was identified as being in the Antennatus genus. It has since remained named Antennatus coccineus from 2012 onwards.

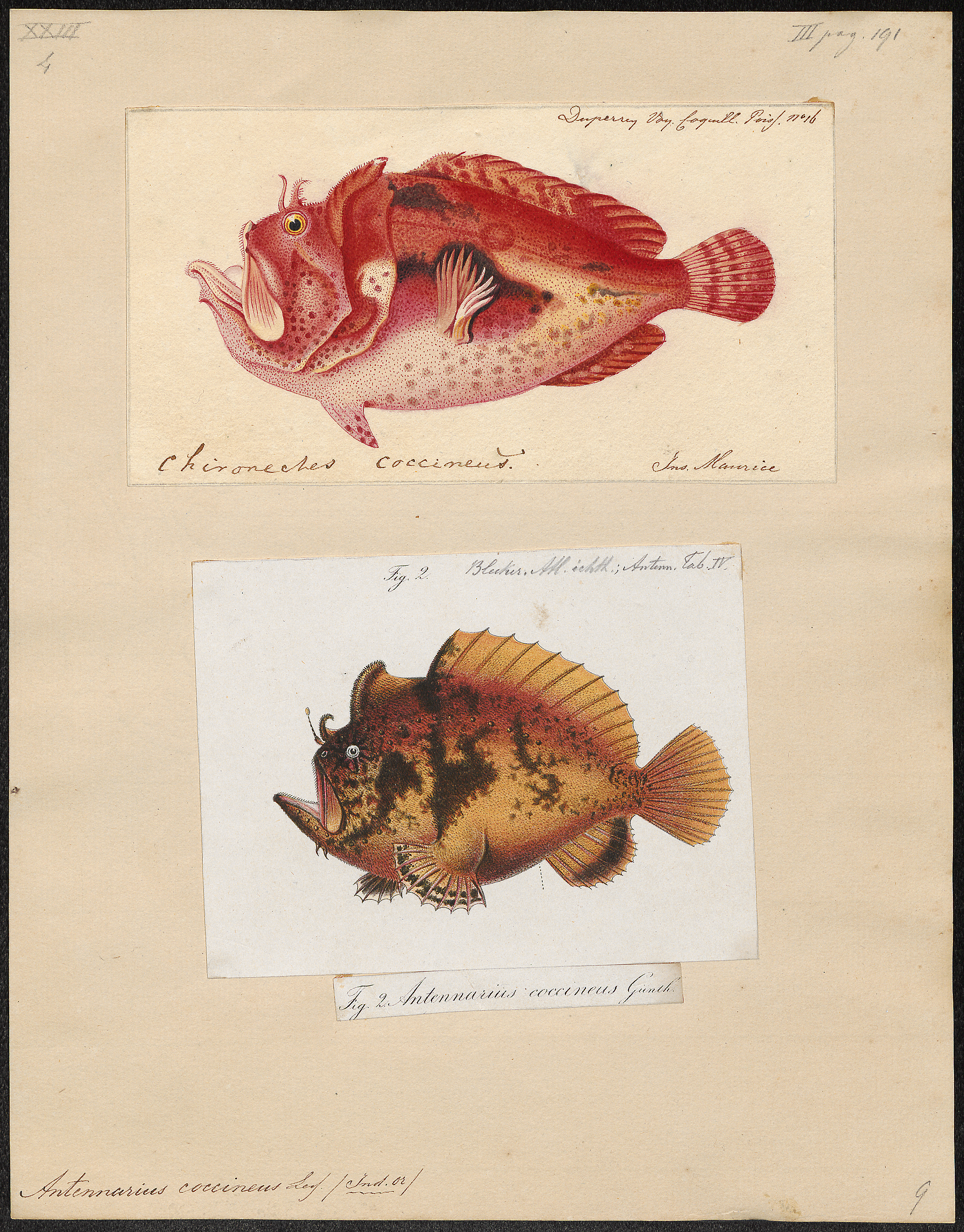
Print of Antennarius coccineus and Antennarius marmoratus

== Description ==
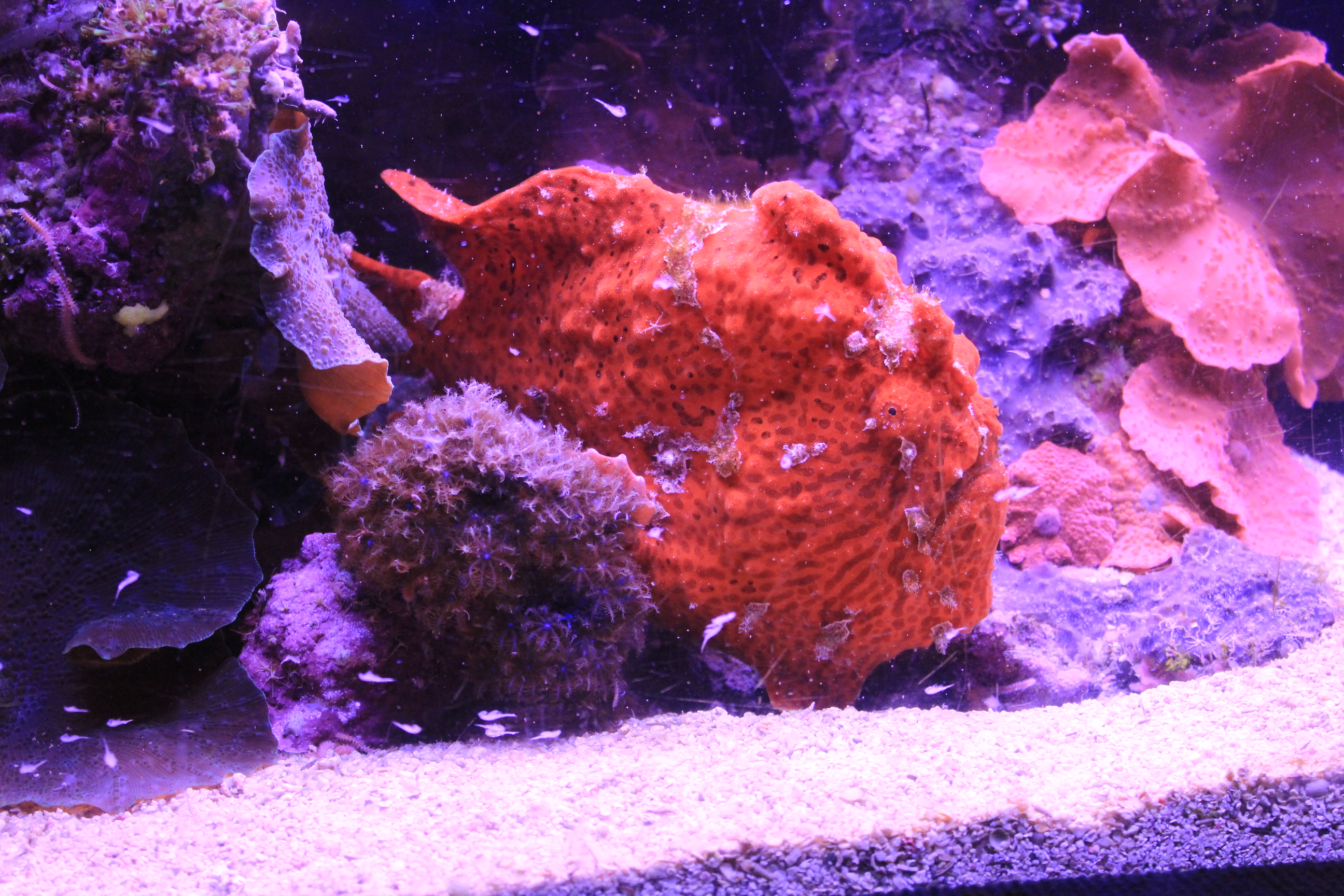
Image of Abantennarius coccineus in Aquarium

The scarlet frogfish has large variety regarding its documented physical appearance. Reports of the scarlet frogfish state that this fish has been found in varying colours, specifically pale tan, mottled red and yellow, often with small dark spots on its body. It grows to a maximum of 13 centimetres (5.1 in) as a fully developed adult but can also be found at much smaller sizes. Size is not reported as being influenced by sex. Abantennarius coccineus has many characteristics common with the Antennariidae family. This includes being stocky and unstreamlined, having a scaleless body, bifurcated spinules, an upward pointing mouth with palatal teeth as well as the lure associated with anglerfish. Defining characteristics of Abantennarius coccineus include the last pelvic fin ray being split in two, its second dorsal fin being curved and having an illicium that is much smaller than the standard frogfish illicium length, previously recorded as being only 8.8% the normal length. Another unique trait is the growth on the top of its head that acts as a lure of which has a large variety, ranging from an unpigmented tissue lump to a long protuberance coming out of its head. Other identifying characteristics include a faint, missing or weakly developed basidorsal mark along with the lack of a distinctive tail base. Like other members of the Antennarius group, Abantennarius coccineus has its second dorsal fin being unattached via tissue to the head, however, unlike other Lophiiforme fish, it is missing the dark patch on the back of the dorsal fin, identifying it as its own separate species. The scarlet frogfish is also missing numerous spines along its back.

== Behaviour ==
Similar to all frogfishes, A. coccineus is a voracious carnivore which devours all small prey that enters within its reach. Like other members of the Antennariidae family, it has a solitary and benthic lifestyle, only tolerating each other for the simple act of fertilization. Frogfish express various behaviours when feeling threatened. To prevent attacks, they will either remain as still as possible, using their camouflage to hide or else they will use Batesian Mimicry. This is where a prey animal will mimic other dangerous species to prevent predators attacking. Antennatus coccineus is known to do this by resting on the seafloor in the way a sea urchin would or else picking up similar behaviours to the poisonous scorpionfish. Once attacked by a predator they use their mouths powerful suction to swell their whole body with water, making it difficult for any predatorial animal to swallow it. A unique behaviour to the family Antennariidae is the unique form of locomotion they have. Many of the fish in this family, including Abantennarius coccineus, can take water in through the mouth and expel it through gill openings similar to tubes, located behind its pectoral fins. Using powerful exhalation, it can propel itself forward and often does so to help ambush its prey. Antennatus is also mainly nocturnally active however still catches prey during the day time

== Reproduction ==
The scarlet frogfish only comes together with other frogfish for reproduction purposes during mating seasons. It lives within tropical waters and has a central distribution being around Indo-East-Pacific. Female and male frogfish are physically different, with the female being oviparous. The female frogfish will start producing eggs when she is ready to mate. The extra mass of eggs inside of her causes her body to bloat, becoming larger and more buoyant with the added air space. This bloating will attract males who see the female as ready to reproduce. Males can follow the female for up to two days before the fertilisation process begins. The male will then nudge the female, with use of her added buoyancy, all the way to the surface where she will then release the eggs to be externally fertilised by the male frogfish. The eggs come together to form a floating gelatinous spawn or a raft, where they will then stay in the open ocean water until they hatch. The offspring or larvae will remain in this open ocean environment, hidden within plankton for the first one to two months of their life before they migrate to live within the reef. It is here they remain until they reach sexual maturity in which the process restarts. The scarlet frogfish is classified as having high resilience, with its population being able to double in less than one year and 3 months and due to this it is also listed as a non-vulnerable species.

== Diet ==
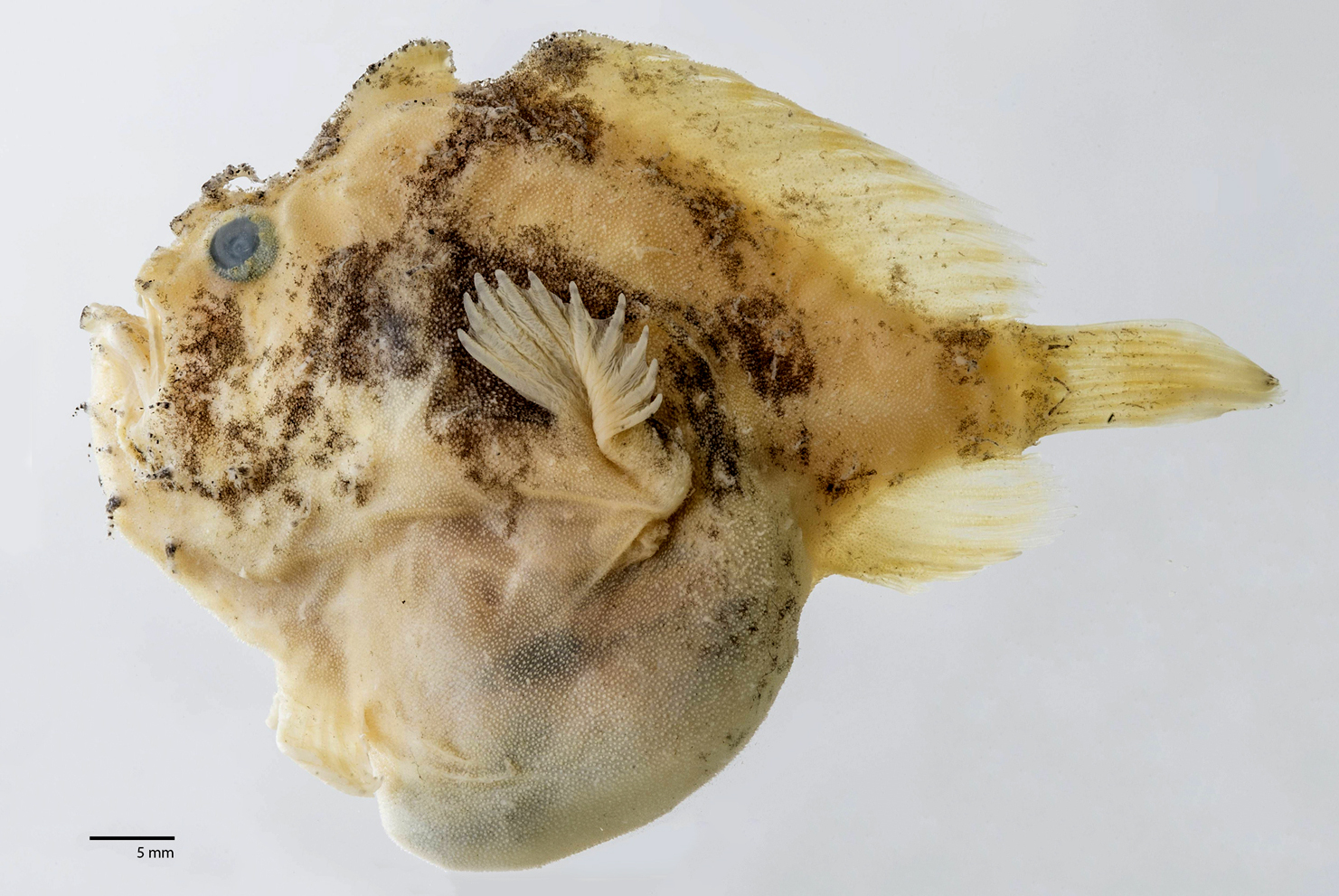
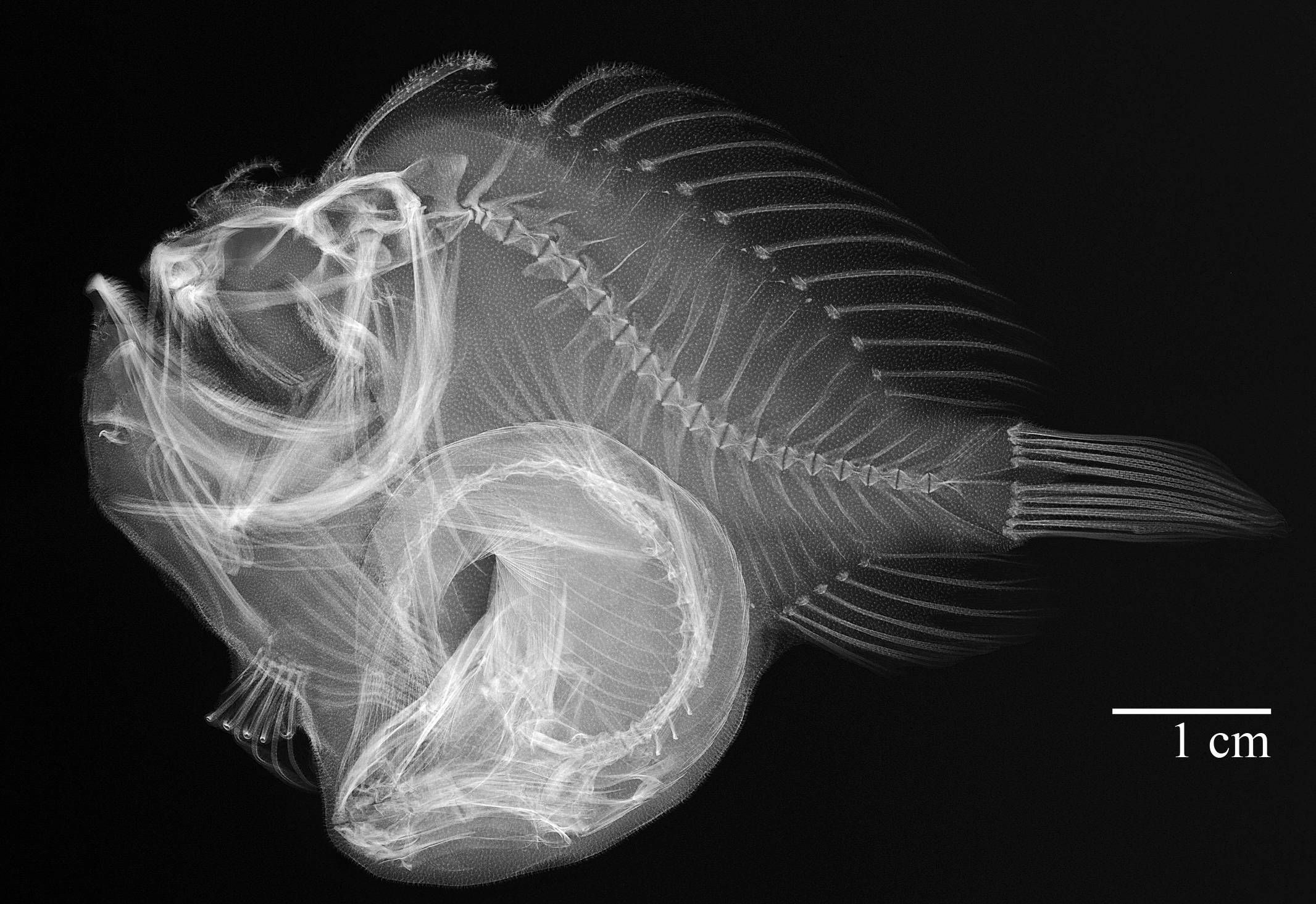
Abantennarius coccineus and accompanied by its X-ray image, revealing a large prey in its stomach

The scarlet frogfish is an ambush predator. It uses a combination of the esca or the anglerfish lure to draw in its prey and its ability to camouflage in rocks and coral to hide from it. In the sight of its prey, it will stop moving so as not to scare it away. When small marine creatures are drawn to the esca, it will lurch out, expanding its mouth and engulfing its prey by creating suction as its mouth expands. Frogfish are known to be able to do this extremely fast, almost at 6/1000 of a second. They mainly eat small reef-dwelling fish such as school fish. However, they can also eat small crustaceans that they encounter such as sand crabs and shrimp using their palatal teeth.

== Habitat ==
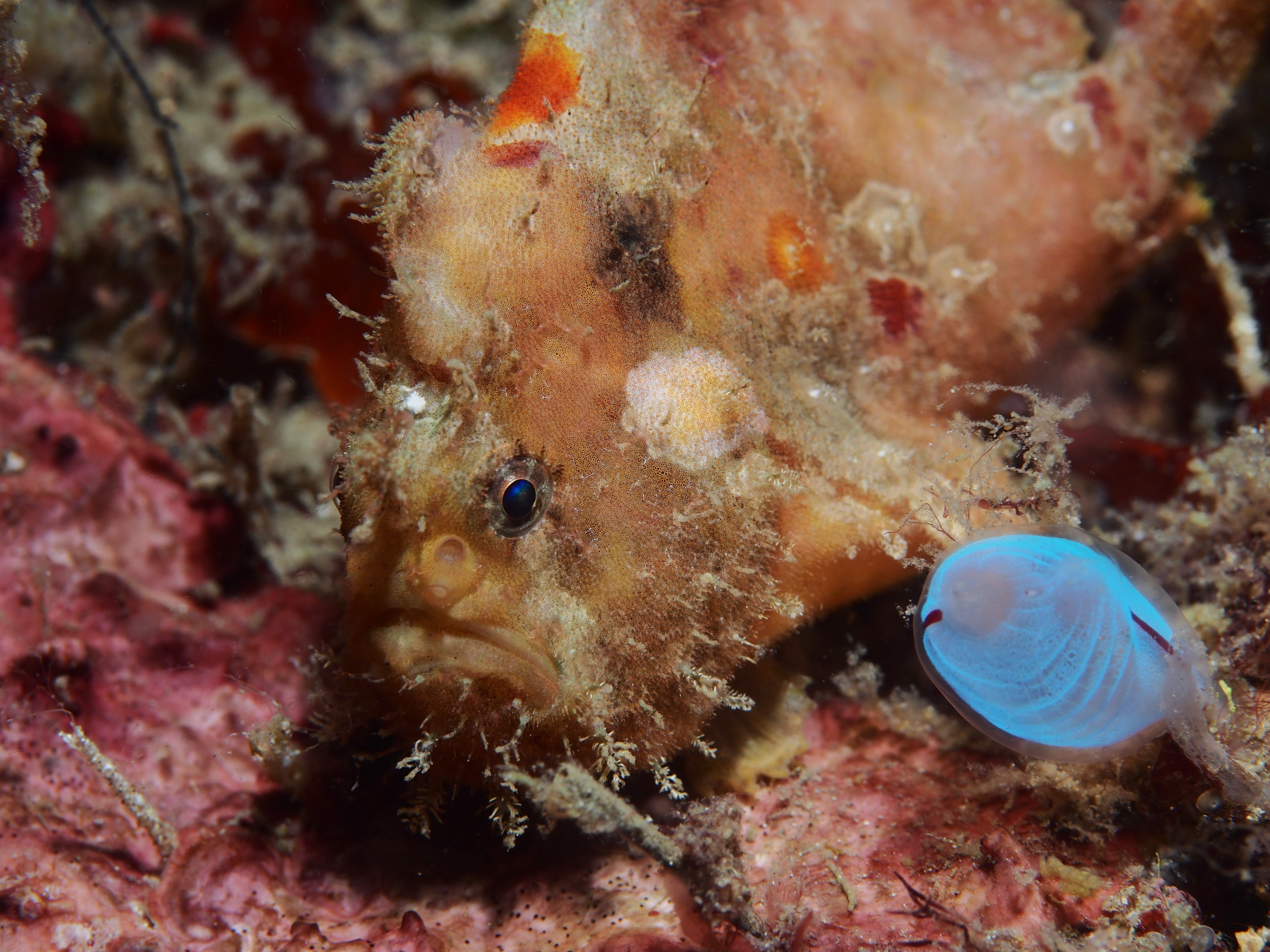
Abantennarius coccineus blending into its surroundings

The scarlet frogfish is a tropical salt-water fish. It lives in reef areas, within epipelagic waters in the open ocean (1–75 m deep). They are more likely to be found in waters less than 10 meters deep and are mainly benthic dwelling fish. It will only leave the ground to reproduce. The physical characteristics of Abantennarius coccineus such as their colour, patterns and bifurcated spinules allow them to blend in with the reef environment The frogfish uses this to its advantage by hiding amongst the rocks, sponges and coral within the reef to protect itself from predators and to ambush its prey. They are solitary fish and as such prefer to be alone and away from other scarlet frogfish.

== Distribution ==
The scarlet frogfish is prominent on the East Coast of Africa, Madagascar and the Arabian sea as a native species. It is also found having been introduced in the Indo-East-Pacific, the easternmost islands of the Pacific Ocean and heavily in Northern Australia. Its native locations are much smaller than its suitable habitat range, with it suiting environments located on the East Coast of Mexico, South America and the West Coast of North Africa. Previously it was believed that Abantennarius coccineus was also native to Hawaii, however, due to different numbers of pectoral rays (Abantennarius coccineus having 12 and the Hawaiian freckled anglerfish having 10) it was determined they are a different species and as such Abantennarius coccineus is no longer classified as being located in Hawaii. Abantennarius coccineus is a scarcely distributed species. In a study done on the abundance of reef fish in India, only 2 scarlet frogfish species were encountered compared to the 154 lionfish, demonstrating the scarce nature of it in non-native areas.

== Human interaction ==
The scarlet frogfish is not harmful to humans, it is not known to bite due to its small size, preference for smaller prey and also its 'play dead' method of predatorial protection. Frogfish are not caught by fisheries for food or consumption purposes; however, it is a very common bycatch in shrimp trawling. In the Arabian sea, Abantennarius coccineus makes up 19.3% of the total bycatch number of shrimp trawling, along with 28.4% of the total mass of bycatch. Commercially, Antennatus coccineus is only of interest for tropical and salt-water fish tanks and aquariums; it is an ornamental or display fish. Besides this, there is very little human interaction within this frogfish species.
