= Sea ox-eye =

Sea ox-eye may refer to the following plant species:

- Borrichia arborescens
- Wollastonia biflora
