= Beach ox-eye =

Beach ox-eye may refer to the following plant species:

- Borrichia frutescens
- Wollastonia biflora
