= Abantennarius bermudensis =

Conservation status
- Least Concern (IUCN 3.1)

Scientific classification
- Kingdom: Animalia
- Phylum: Chordata
- Class: Actinopterygii
- Order: Lophiiformes
- Family: Antennariidae
- Genus: Abantennarius
- Species: A. bermudensis

Binomial name
- Abantennarius bermudensis (Schultz, 1957)

Synonyms
- Antennarius bermudensis Schultz, 1957; Antennatus bermudensis (Schultz, 1957)

Species of fish

Abantennarius bermudensis, the island frogfish, is a species of marine ray-finned fish belonging to the family Antennariidae, the frogfishes. The island frogfish is found in the Western Atlantic Ocean.

== Taxonomy ==
Abantennarius bermudensis was first formally described as Antennarius bermudensis in 1957 by the American ichthyologist Leonard Peter Schultz with its type locality given as Hungry Bay in Paget County, Bermuda. The 5th edition of Fishes of the World classifies the genus Abantennarius in the family Antennariidae within the suborder Antennarioidei within the order Lophiiformes, the anglerfishes.

== Etymology ==
Abantennarius bermudensis has the genus name Abantennarius which prefixes ab, meaning "away from", onto antennarius, a fish of the family Antennaridae. This is an allusion to the gill opening being positioned away from the base of the pectoral fin, which is typically where it is located in frogfishes. The specific name bermudensis means "of Bermuda", the type locality .

== Description ==
Abantennarius bermudensis has a subglobular body which has some lateral compression. The head is not spiny and it has large eyes on its side. The mouth points upwards and is filled with small, sharp teeth. The bill opening is located under and to the rear of the base of the pectoral fin and is small and round. The illicium is shorter than the second dorsal spine and has an elongated, tapering esca with filaments and dark swellings at its base. The second dorsal spine has a marked curve and is not connected to the head by a membrane, the third dorsal spine is also moveable and has no membrane connection to the head.. The arm like pectoral fins have a joint similar to an elbow. The second dorsal fin contains 12 soft rays and the anal fin contains 7 soft rays. The rear of the dorsal and anal fins have membranes connecting them to the caudal fin. The skin on the body is rough to the touch caused by its dense covering of bifurcated spinules. The overall colour is yellow, tan or brown marked with brown spots and mottles, these may join to create irregular bars across the caudal fin. There is a clear dark eyespot on the upper body underneath the, centre of the second dorsal fin, there may be dark bars radiating from the eye, varying in number between 0 and 7. The island frogfish has a maximum published standard length of 7.6 cm (3.0 in).

== Distribution and habitat ==
Abantennarius bermudensis Is found in the Western Atlantic Ocean from Bermuda in the north, around the Bahamas, off northwestern Cuba, in the Gulf of Mexico from the Arrowsmith Bank off Mexico, to Cuba and around the islands of Hispaniola and Puerto Rico. It is also found off the northern coast of South America from Colombia to Tobago. The island frogfish is associated with reefs in waters between 4 and 30 m (13 and 98 ft) in depth.

== Biology ==
Abantennarius bermudensis is an ambush predator which crawls slowly along the substrate in rocky and coral reefs. The illicium and esca are used to lure smaller fishes to within striking range of the mouth. The females are though to lay more than 10,000 eggs. The biology and ecology of the island frogfish are poorly known.
