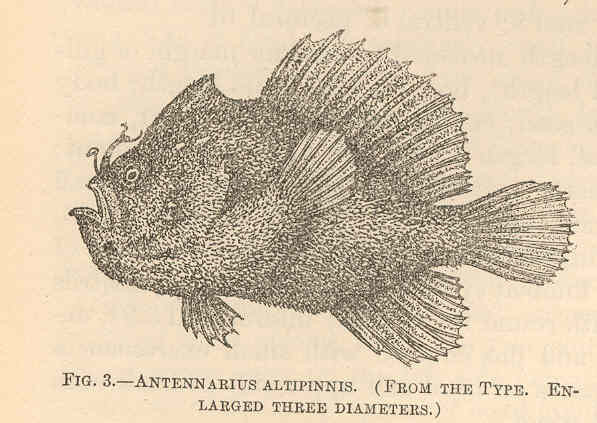

Conservation status
- Least Concern (IUCN 3.1)

Scientific classification
- Kingdom: Animalia
- Phylum: Chordata
- Class: Actinopterygii
- Order: Lophiiformes
- Family: Antennariidae
- Genus: Abantennarius
- Species: A. dorehensis

Binomial name
- Abantennarius dorehensis (Bleeker, 1859)

Synonyms
- Antennarius dorehensis Bleeker, 1859; Antennatus dorehensis (Bleeker, 1859); Antennarius altipinnis H. M. Smith & Radcliffe, 1912; Antennarius albomarginatus Fowler, 1945; Antennarius niveus Fowler, 1946; Antennarius punctatissimus Fowler, 1946

= Abantennarius dorehensis =

Species of fish

Abantennarius dorehensis, the New Guinean frogfish, bandtail frogfish, Dorei frogfish or white-spotted frogfish, is a species of marine ray-finned fish belonging to the family Antennariidae, the frogfishes. The New Guinean frogfish is found in the Indo-Pacific region.

== Taxonomy ==
Abantennarius dorehensis was first formally described as Antennarius dorehensis in 1859 by the Dutch physician, herpetologist and ichthyologist Pieter Bleeker with its type locality given as Doreh Bay [Doreh], off Manokwari in West Papua, New Guinea. The 5th edition of Fishes of the World classifies the genus Abantennarius in the family Antennariidae within the suborder Antennarioidei within the order Lophiiformes, the anglerfishes.

== Etymology ==
Abantennarius dorehensis has the genus name Abantennarius which prefixes ab, meaning "away from", onto antennarius, a fish of the family Antennaridae. This is an allusion to the gill opening being positioned away from the base of the pectoral fin, which is typically where it is located in frogfishes. The specific name dorehensis denotes the type locality of Doreh Bay.

== Description ==
Abantennarius dorehensis has the globose, short, deep and weakly compressed body typical of frogfishes. In this species the opening of the gill is located close to or on the "arm-like" base of the pectoral fin. The illicium has a bony part which is shorter than the second dorsal spine, with an esca may be a simple oval or tapering and lacking in any dark basal swellings or filaments. There are typically 12 soft rays in the second dorsal fin, although there may occasionally be 11 or 13, while the anal fin contains 7 or 8 soft rays. The rear of these fins is connected to the caudal fin by a membrane, there is a short caudal peduncle. There is a dense covering of two-pointed spinules on the skin. The colour varies from pale grey, pale yellow to dark brown and black, with numerous small whitish spots on the head, body and base of the pectoral fin. The colour of the fins varies from dark violet to brownish grey. The margins of the dorsal, anal and caudal fins of darker fishes are pale. There may be an indistinct spot at the base of the soft dorsal fin. The New Guinean frogfish has a maximum published standard length of 14 cm (5.5 in).

== Distribution and habitat ==
Abantennarius dorehensis has a wide Indo-Pacific distribution. It occurs along the eastern coast of Africa where it has been recorded from Kenya, Inhaca Island in Mozambique, Aldabra and the Comoro Islands. In the eastern Indian Ocean and western Pacific it is recorded from the Cocos (Keeling) Islands and Rowley Shoals north to the Ryukyu Islands and east to French Polynesia. The New Guinean frogfish is found on intertidal reef flats at depths down to 10 m (33 ft).

== Biology ==
Abantennarius dorehensis is an ambush predators, remaining very still, camouflaged to the environment and waving the esca in front of the mouth to lure prey within range of the large mouth. The New Guinean frogfish has separate sexes and external fertilisation. The females lay the eggs within a floating gelatinous mass or raft. The eggs remain within these masses until the larvae, which are planktonic, hatch.
