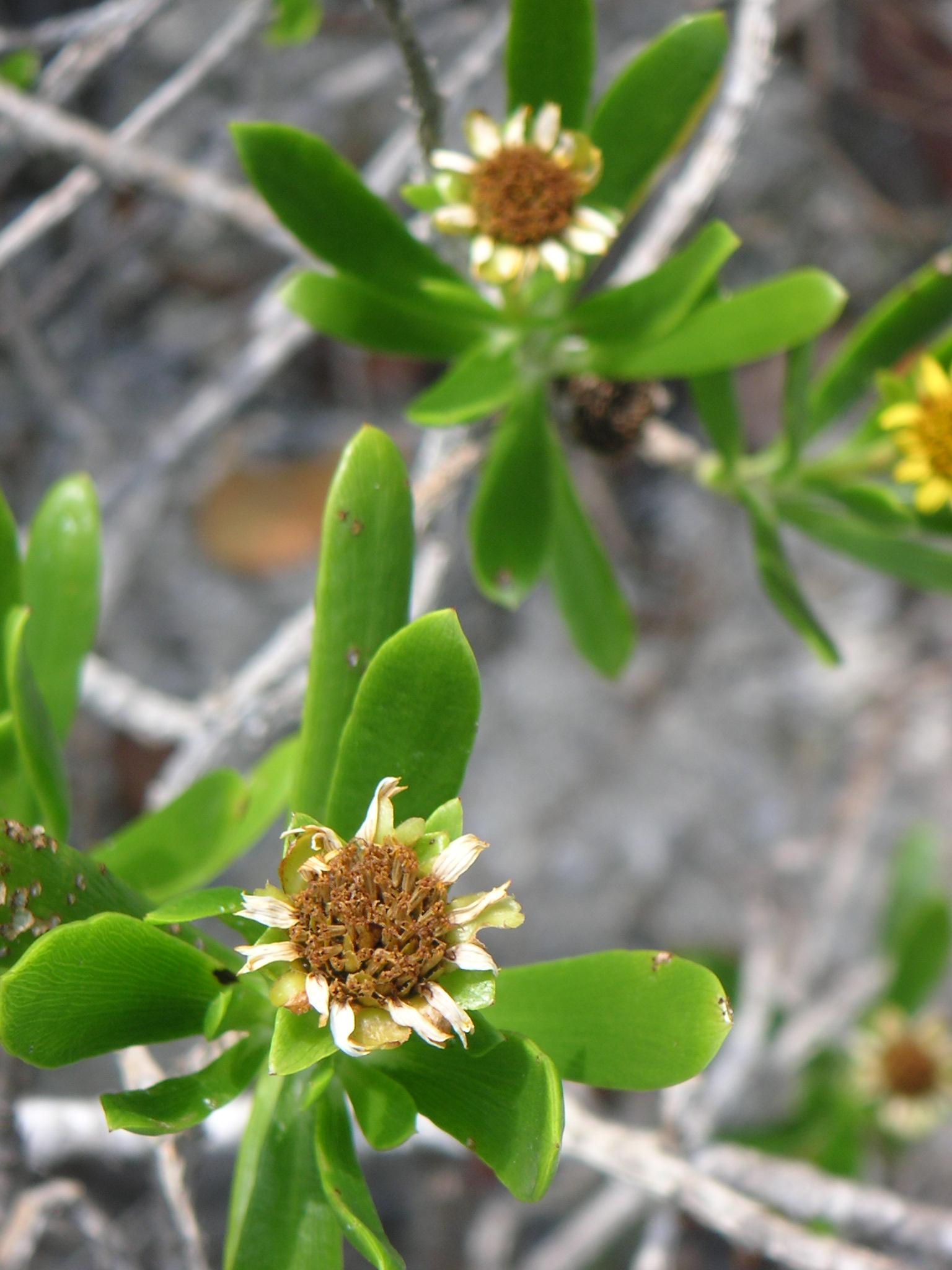
- Borrichia arborescens

Scientific classification
- Kingdom: Plantae
- Clade: Tracheophytes
- Clade: Angiosperms
- Clade: Eudicots
- Clade: Asterids
- Order: Asterales
- Family: Asteraceae
- Subfamily: Asteroideae
- Tribe: Heliantheae
- Subtribe: Engelmanniinae
- Genus: Borrichia; Adans.

Type species
- Borrichia frutescens (L.) DC.

Synonyms
- Helicta Cass.; Adelmannia Rchb.; Diomedea Cass.; Trimetra Moc. ex DC.; Diomedella Cass.

= Borrichia =

Genus of flowering plants

Borrichia is a genus of flowering plants in the family Asteraceae. It is named for Danish physician Ole Borch (1628–1690). Members of the genus are commonly known as seaside tansies. They are native to North and South America.

== Species and nothospecies ==
Sources for species and nothospecies:

- Borrichia arborescens (L.) DC. – tree seaside tansy - Florida, West Indies, Belize, Honduras, Tabasco, Veracruz, Yucatán Peninsula
- Borrichia × cubana Britton & S.F.Blake – Cuban borrichia - Cuba, southern Florida
- Borrichia frutescens (L.) DC. – bushy seaoxeye, bushy seaside tansy - coastal regions from Yucatán Peninsula to Maryland; also Coahuila, San Luis Potosí
- Borrichia peruviana (Lam.) DC. - Peru
