= Antennatus linearis =

Scientific classification
- Domain: Eukaryota
- Kingdom: Animalia
- Phylum: Chordata
- Class: Actinopterygii
- Order: Lophiiformes
- Family: Antennariidae
- Genus: Antennatus
- Species: A. linearis

Binomial name
- Antennatus linearis J. E. Randall & Holcom, 2001

Species of fish

Antennatus linearis, sometimes known as the pygmy anglerfish or the lined frogfish, is a species of fish in the family Antennariidae. It is native to the Indo-Pacific, where it is known from East Africa, the Aldabra Islands, the Comoro Islands, the Molucca Islands, and the Hawaiian Islands. It is a secretive reef-dwelling fish that occurs at a depth of 4 to 33 m (13 to 108 ft) and reaches 7.5 cm (3 inches) SL. This species is usually seen under coral rubble or in rocky areas. It is (as of January 2022) the most recently described species in the genus Antennatus, as well as the only species in the genus described in the 21st century.
