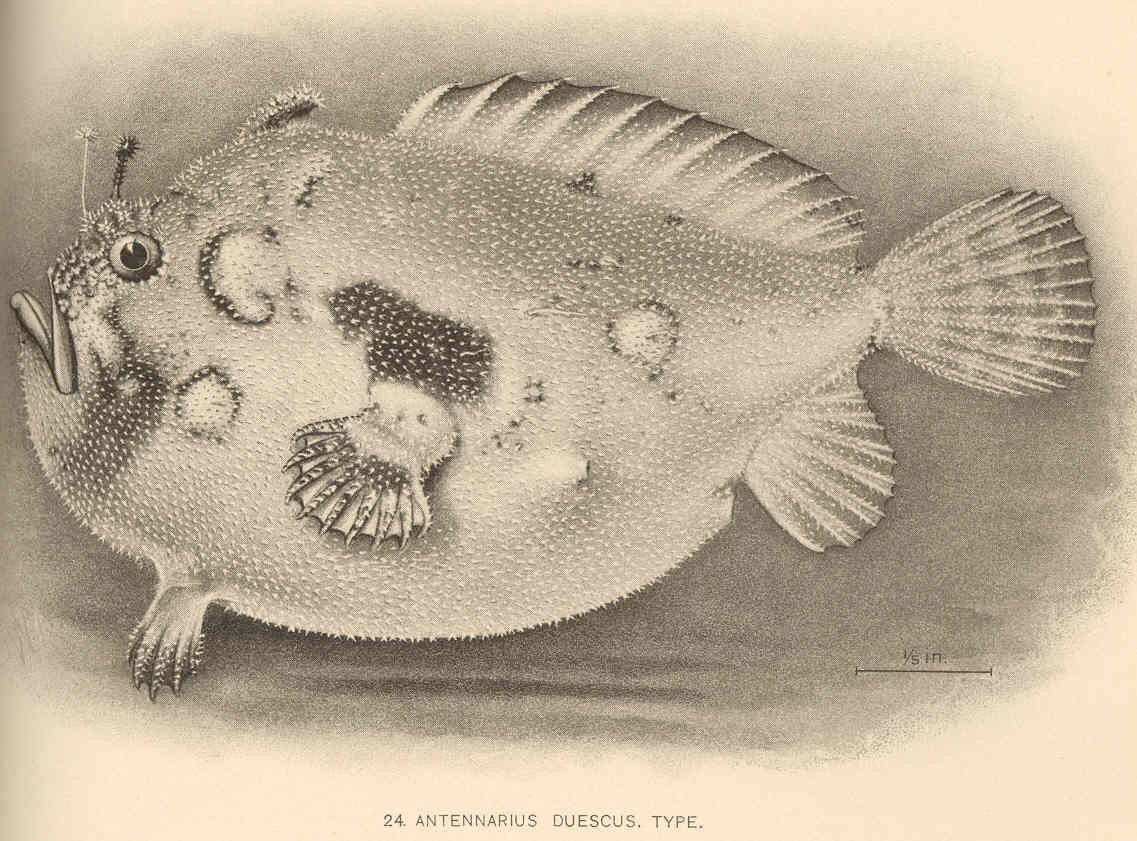

Scientific classification
- Kingdom: Animalia
- Phylum: Chordata
- Class: Actinopterygii
- Order: Lophiiformes
- Family: Antennariidae
- Subfamily: Antennariinae
- Genus: Abantennarius; Schultz, 1957

Type species
- Antennarius duescus Snyder, 1904

= Abantennarius =

Genus of fishes

Abantennarius is a genus of marine ray-finned fishes belonging to the family Antennariidae, the frogfishes. The fishes in the genus are found in the Indian, Pacific and, one species, in the Western Atlantic Oceans.

== Taxonomy ==
Abantennarius was first proposed as a genus in 1957 by the American ichthyologist Leonard Peter Schultz with Antennarius duescus designated as the type species.A. duescus has originally been described in 1904 by John Otterbein Snyder with its type locality given as between Maui and Lanai in the Hawaiian Islands. This genus has been regarded as a synonym of Antennarius, but is now regarded as valid genus. Some authorities classify this genus in the subfamily Antennariinae within the family Antennariidae. However, the 5th edition of Fishes of the World does not recognise subfamilies within the Antennariidae, classifying the family within the suborder Antennarioidei within the order Lophiiformes, the anglerfishes.

== Etymology ==
Abantennarius prefixes ab, meaning "away from", onto antennarius, a fish of the family Antennaridae. This is an allusion to the gill opening being positioned away from the base of the pectoral fin, which is typically where it is located in frogfishes.

== Species ==
Abantennarius contains the following recognised species:

- Abantennarius analis (Schultz, 1957) (Tailjet frogfish)
- Abantennarius bermudensis (Schultz, 1957) (Island frogfish)
- Abantennarius coccineus (Lesson, 1831) (Scarlet frogfish)
- Abantennarius dorehensis (Bleeker, 1859) (New Guinean frogfish)
- Abantennarius drombus (D. S. Jordan & Evermann, 1903) (Freckled frogfish)
- Abantennarius duescus (Snyder, 1904) (Side-jet frogfish)
- Abantennarius nummifer (Cuvier, 1817) (Spotfin frogfish)
- Abantennarius rosaceus (H. M. Smith & Radcliffe, 1912) (Spine-tufted frogfish)
- Abantennarius sanguineus (Gill, 1863) (Bloody frogfish)

== Characteristics ==
Abantennarius frogfishes have round, nearly globular bodies that are to some degree compressed. They do not have spines on the illicium and the esca is very small or absent. The second dorsal spine is not connected to the head by a membrane while the third dorsal spine may be flexible or immobile. The mouth is upward pointing and is very large. The pectoral fins have developed to resemble limbs and have an "elbow", the fin is widely linked to the body. The gill opening is small and round, under and to the rear of the base of the pectoral fin. There is no caudal peduncle and the rear edges of the dorsal fin and anal fin are connected to the caudal fin by membranes. The rays in the caudal fin may be branched. The body is covered in thick skin which is covered in dense, closely set spinules. They typically have a dark blotch covering part of the upper body and the base of the dorsal fin. The smallest species in the genus is A. duescus, with a maximum published standard length of 3 cm (1.2 in), while the largest is A. dorehensis with a maximum published total length is 14 cm (5.5 in).

== Distribution ==
Abantennarius frogfishes are found in the Indian Ocean and Pacific Ocean from the eastern coasts of Africa east to the western coasts of the Americas, with one species A. bermudensis in the western Atlantic Ocean.
