= Antennatus flagellatus =

Scientific classification
- Kingdom: Animalia
- Phylum: Chordata
- Class: Actinopterygii
- Order: Lophiiformes
- Family: Antennariidae
- Genus: Antennatus
- Species: A. flagellatus

Binomial name
- Antennatus flagellatus Ohnishi, Iwata & Hiramatsu, 1997

Species of fish

Antennatus flagellatus, sometimes known as the whip frogfish, is a species of fish in the family Antennariidae. It is known only from Kashiwajima Island, Kōchi, Japan, and it was described from two specimens collected from a rock ledge on a sandy slope near the island. It occurs at depths of less than 45 m (148 ft) and reaches 4.9 cm (1.9 inches) SL. This species can be distinguished from other members of the genus Antennatus by its notably long illicium, which can exceed 40% of the fish's standard length.
