= Pissonotus niger =

Scientific classification
- Domain: Eukaryota
- Kingdom: Animalia
- Phylum: Arthropoda
- Class: Insecta
- Order: Hemiptera
- Suborder: Auchenorrhyncha
- Infraorder: Fulgoromorpha
- Family: Delphacidae
- Genus: Pissonotus
- Species: P. niger

Binomial name
- Pissonotus niger Morgan & Beamer, 1949

Species of true bug

Pissonotus niger is a species of delphacid planthopper in the family Delphacidae. It is found in North America.
