= Pissonotus brunneus =

Scientific classification
- Kingdom: Animalia
- Phylum: Arthropoda
- Clade: Pancrustacea
- Class: Insecta
- Order: Hemiptera
- Suborder: Auchenorrhyncha
- Infraorder: Fulgoromorpha
- Family: Delphacidae
- Genus: Pissonotus
- Species: P. brunneus

Binomial name
- Pissonotus brunneus Van Duzee, 1897

Species of true bug

Pissonotus brunneus is a species of delphacid planthopper in the family Delphacidae. It is found in Central America and North America.
