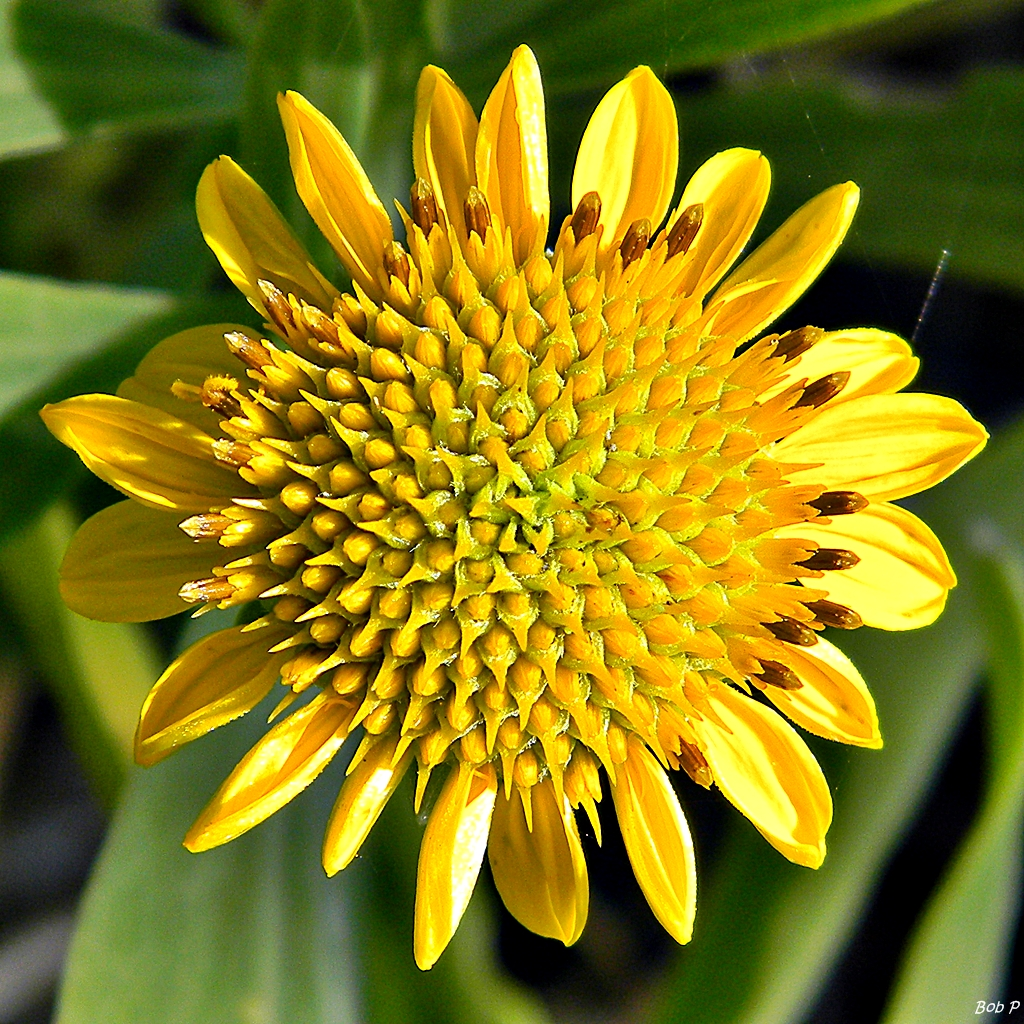

Conservation status
- Secure (NatureServe)

Scientific classification
- Kingdom: Plantae
- Clade: Embryophytes
- Clade: Tracheophytes
- Clade: Angiosperms
- Clade: Eudicots
- Clade: Asterids
- Order: Asterales
- Family: Asteraceae
- Tribe: Heliantheae
- Genus: Borrichia
- Species: B. frutescens

Binomial name
- Borrichia frutescens (L.) DC.

Synonyms
- Bubonium frutescens (L.) Hill; Buphthalmum frutescens L.; Buphthalmum incanum Mill.; Diomedea bidentata Cass.; Diomedea linearis Cass.

= Borrichia frutescens =

Species of flowering plant

Borrichia frutescens is a North American species of flowering plants in the family Asteraceae known by the common names sea oxeye, sea oxeye daisy, bushy seaside tansy, and sea-marigold. In Veracruz it is called verdolaga de mar. It is native to the United States and Mexico, where it occurs along the Atlantic and Gulf Coasts. Its distribution extends from Maryland south to Florida and west to Texas in the US, and along the Mexican Gulf Coast to the Yucatán Peninsula. It is an introduced species in some areas, such as Bermuda and Spain.

== Description ==
This species is variable in appearance. In general, it is a perennial herb or shrub reaching up to about 90 centimeters (3 feet) tall. The herbage is gray-green to silvery, and fleshy. It has oval to lance-shaped leaves up to 11 centimeters long. The blades are toothed near the bases, smooth-edged otherwise, and are usually hairy. The leaf base or petiole usually has at least one spine. The inflorescence is a solitary rounded flower head lined with spine-tipped phyllaries. The head has 15 to 30 short, yellow ray florets. At the center are many yellow disc florets with black anthers. The fruit is a dark-colored, flattened, somewhat triangular cypsela a few millimeters long. As the head dries and the flowers fall away, it becomes a hard, spiny, burr-like body packed with the small fruits. The life span of the plant may exceed five years.

== Biology ==
The flowering season varies geographically and according to weather conditions, but along the US Gulf Coast it usually takes place from June to August. Reproduction occurs sexually by flowering, as well as vegetatively via rhizome.

This plant is a halophyte, growing in various types of coastal habitat. It occurs on beaches, dunes, and barrier islands, in saline and brackish wetlands and mangroves. It is an emergent plant, tolerating inundation in ocean water. It also tolerates drought and a range of soil conditions, from acidic to alkaline. In the Florida Keys much of its substrate is limestone.

== Ecology ==
This species occurs with another member of its genus, Borrichia arborescens, in some parts of its range. The two often hybridize, producing offspring that has been called Borrichia × cubana, the Cuban borrichia. The hybrid is variable in morphology, but it is usually intermediate to its parents.

The plant also grows with other typical salt marsh and coastline plants such as glasswort (Salicornia virginica), saltwort (Batis maritima), seashore saltgrass (Distichlis spicata), and annual seepweed (Suaeda linearis).

The plant is attractive to butterflies. Other insects associated with it include the delphacid planthopper Pissonotus quadripustulatus, aphids of the genus Uroleucon (formerly Dactynotus), the leafhopper Carneocephala floridana, and the gall midge Asphondylia borrichiae. P. quadripustulatus and A. borrichiae specialize on this plant. The midge causes the development of galls in the apical meristem. Destruction of tissue in this part of the plant can stop its growth, prevent its flowering, and kill the whole stem. There is usually one gall per plant, but each may have several chambers, usually no more than three, but sometimes up to eight. Each contains a fly larva which feeds on fungus growing inside the gall, then pupates and emerges as an adult. The galls also contain several species of wasps, which are parasitoids on the fly.
