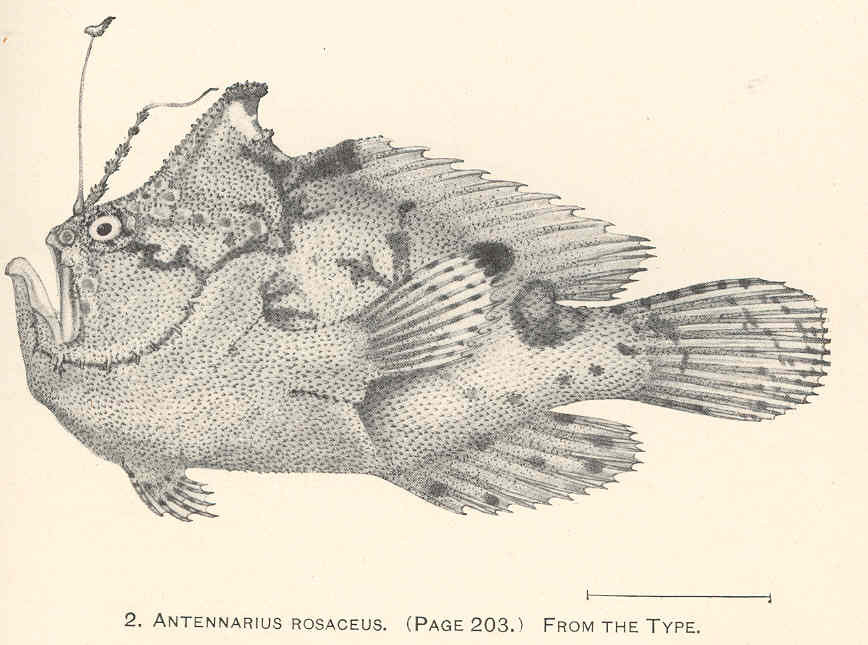

Scientific classification
- Kingdom: Animalia
- Phylum: Chordata
- Class: Actinopterygii
- Order: Lophiiformes
- Family: Antennariidae
- Genus: Abantennarius
- Species: A. rosaceus

Binomial name
- Abantennarius rosaceus (H. M. Smith & Radcliffe, 1912)

Synonyms
- Antennarius rosaceus Smith & Radcliffe, 1912; Antennatus rosaceus (Smith & Radcliffe, 1912)

= Abantennarius rosaceus =

Species of fish

Abantennarius rosaceus, the rosy frogfish, rosy anglerfish, pink anglerfish or spiny tufted frogfish, is a species of marine ray-finned fish belonging to the family Antennariidae, the frogfishes. The rosy frogfish is found in the Indo-Pacific region.

== Taxonomy ==
Abantennarius rosaceus was first formally described in 1912 as Antennarius rosaceus by the American zoologists Hugh McCormick Smith and Lewis Radcliffe with its type locality given as Romblon in the Philippines. The 5th edition of Fishes of the World classifies the genus Abantennarius in the family Antennariidae within the suborder Antennarioidei within the order Lophiiformes, the anglerfishes.

== Etymology ==
Abantennarius rosaceus has the genus name Abantennarius which prefixes ab, meaning "away from", onto antennarius, a fish of the family Antennaridae. This is an allusion to the gill opening being positioned away from the base of the pectoral fin, which is typically where it is located in frogfishes. The specific name rosaceus means "pink", a reference to its rosy colour in alcohol.

== Description ==
Abantennarius rosaceus has the gill opening close to or on the base of the pectoral fin. It has a clear caudal peduncle and the rear edges of the dorsal and anal fins are connected to the caudal peduncle. The illiciumis clearly longer than the second dorsal spine and has an esca, or lure, which is elongate with tapering filaments and a cluster of dark, round swellings at its base. The second dorsal spine is thin and straight, tapering to a point and has small clusters of threads along its length. The second dorsal fin contains 12 or 13 soft rays while the anal fin contains 7or 8 soft rays. As in other members of this genus they have a prehensile pectoral fin with an elbow like joint. There are no scales on the body and the skin has a covering of bifurcated spinules. The typical colour is pinkish-purple with a dark spot on the upper body near the base of the dorsal fin. They also have a reticulated patternover the body. The rosy frogfish has a maximum published standard length of 5.8 cm (2.3 in).

== Distribution ==
Abantennarius rosaceus is known from the Red Sea, where there has been a single record. Elsewhere it has been recorded from Indonesia and the Philippines east to the Marshall Islands and Samoa, north to southern Japan and south to New Caledonia and Australia. In Australia this species is known from Lord Howe Island and the North West Shelf. The rosy frogfish is associated with reefs at depths between 0 and 130 m (0 and 427 ft) but is typically found at depths between 30 and 40 m (98 and 131 ft). It inhabits the sponge zone at moderate depths and may be found on flat areas on the seaward side of reefs.

== Biology ==
Abantennarius rosaceus is oviparous, the females laying egg masses within ribbons of gelatinous mucus, known as an "egg rafts" or "veils", the eggs remain within these until the planktonic larvae emerge. It is piscivorous, attracting prey to within striking range of the mouth with its shrimp-like esca.

== Utilisation ==
Abantennarius rosaceus is infrequently taken from the wild for sale in the aquarium trade.
