= Pissonotus albovenosus =

Scientific classification
- Kingdom: Animalia
- Phylum: Arthropoda
- Clade: Pancrustacea
- Class: Insecta
- Order: Hemiptera
- Suborder: Auchenorrhyncha
- Infraorder: Fulgoromorpha
- Family: Delphacidae
- Genus: Pissonotus
- Species: P. albovenosus

Binomial name
- Pissonotus albovenosus Osborn, 1935

Species of true bug

Pissonotus albovenosus is a species of delphacid planthopper, in the family Delphacidae.

== Habitat ==
It is found in the Caribbean, Central America, and North America, most commonly in the southern United States.
