= Pissonotus marginatus =

Scientific classification
- Domain: Eukaryota
- Kingdom: Animalia
- Phylum: Arthropoda
- Class: Insecta
- Order: Hemiptera
- Suborder: Auchenorrhyncha
- Infraorder: Fulgoromorpha
- Family: Delphacidae
- Genus: Pissonotus
- Species: P. marginatus

Binomial name
- Pissonotus marginatus Van Duzee, 1897

Species of true bug

Pissonotus marginatus is a species in the family Delphacidae ("delphacid planthoppers"), in the order Hemiptera ("true bugs, cicadas, hoppers, aphids and allies"). Pissonotus marginatus is found in North America.
