= Borrichia peruviana =

Scientific classification
- Kingdom: Plantae
- Clade: Tracheophytes
- Clade: Angiosperms
- Clade: Eudicots
- Clade: Asterids
- Order: Asterales
- Family: Asteraceae
- Genus: Borrichia
- Species: B. peruviana

Binomial name
- Borrichia peruviana (Lam.) DC.

Synonyms
- Buphthalmum lineare Willd.; Buphthalmum peruvianum Lam.

Species of plant

Borrichia peruviana is a Peruvian species of flowering plants in the family Asteraceae. It is a perennial herb up to 150 cm (60 inches) tall. Flower heads are yellow, with both disc florets and ray florets.
