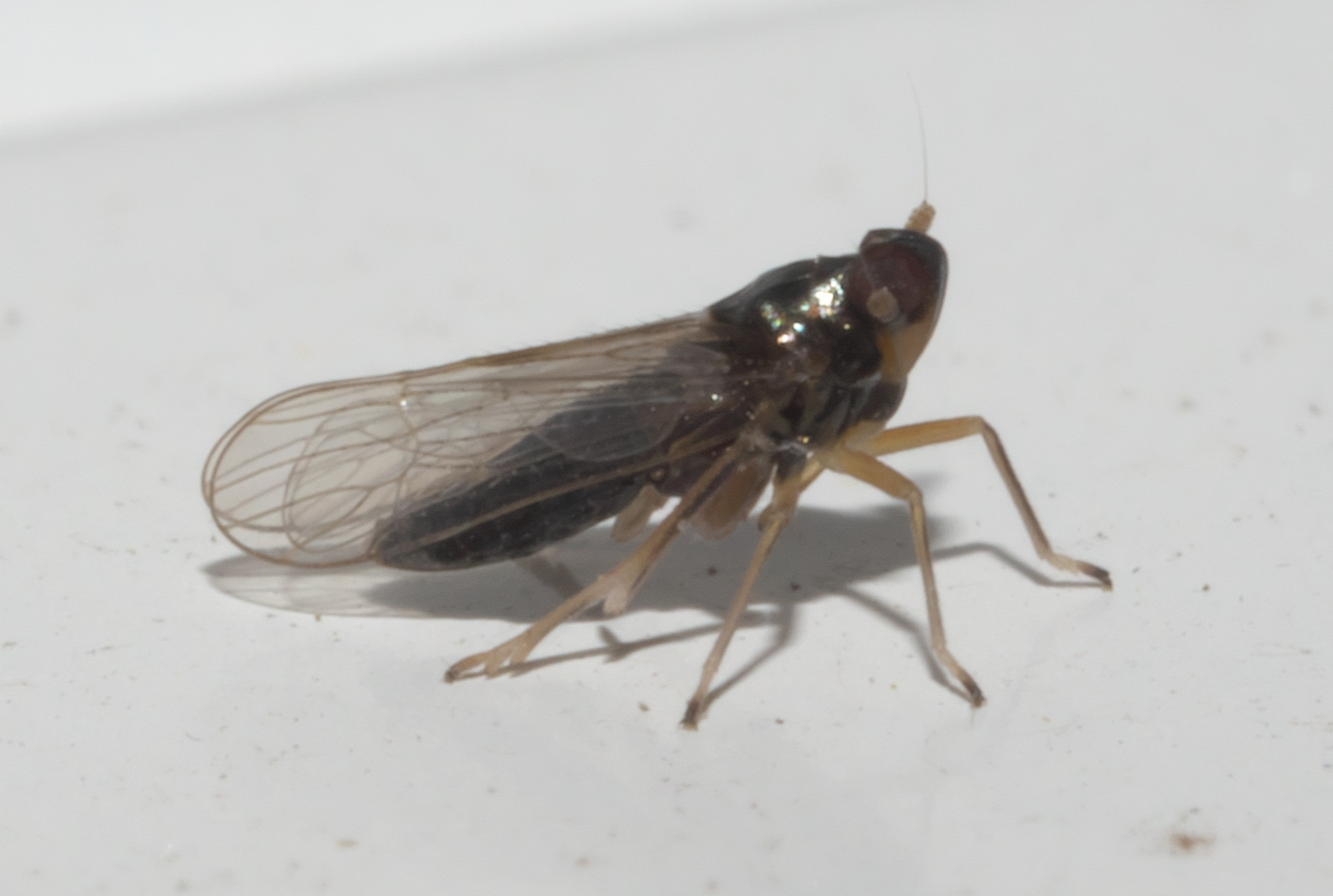
- Pissonotus piceus, Oklahoma

Scientific classification
- Domain: Eukaryota
- Kingdom: Animalia
- Phylum: Arthropoda
- Class: Insecta
- Order: Hemiptera
- Suborder: Auchenorrhyncha
- Infraorder: Fulgoromorpha
- Family: Delphacidae
- Genus: Pissonotus
- Species: P. piceus

Binomial name
- Pissonotus piceus (Van Duzee, 1894)

= Pissonotus piceus =

Species of true bug

Pissonotus piceus is a species of delphacid planthopper in the family Delphacidae. It is found in the Caribbean, Central America, North America, and South America.
