= Pissonotus binotatus =

Scientific classification
- Domain: Eukaryota
- Kingdom: Animalia
- Phylum: Arthropoda
- Class: Insecta
- Order: Hemiptera
- Suborder: Auchenorrhyncha
- Infraorder: Fulgoromorpha
- Family: Delphacidae
- Genus: Pissonotus
- Species: P. binotatus

Binomial name
- Pissonotus binotatus Spooner, 1912

Species of true bug

Pissonotus binotatus is a species of delphacid planthopper in the family Delphacidae. It is found in the Caribbean and North America.
