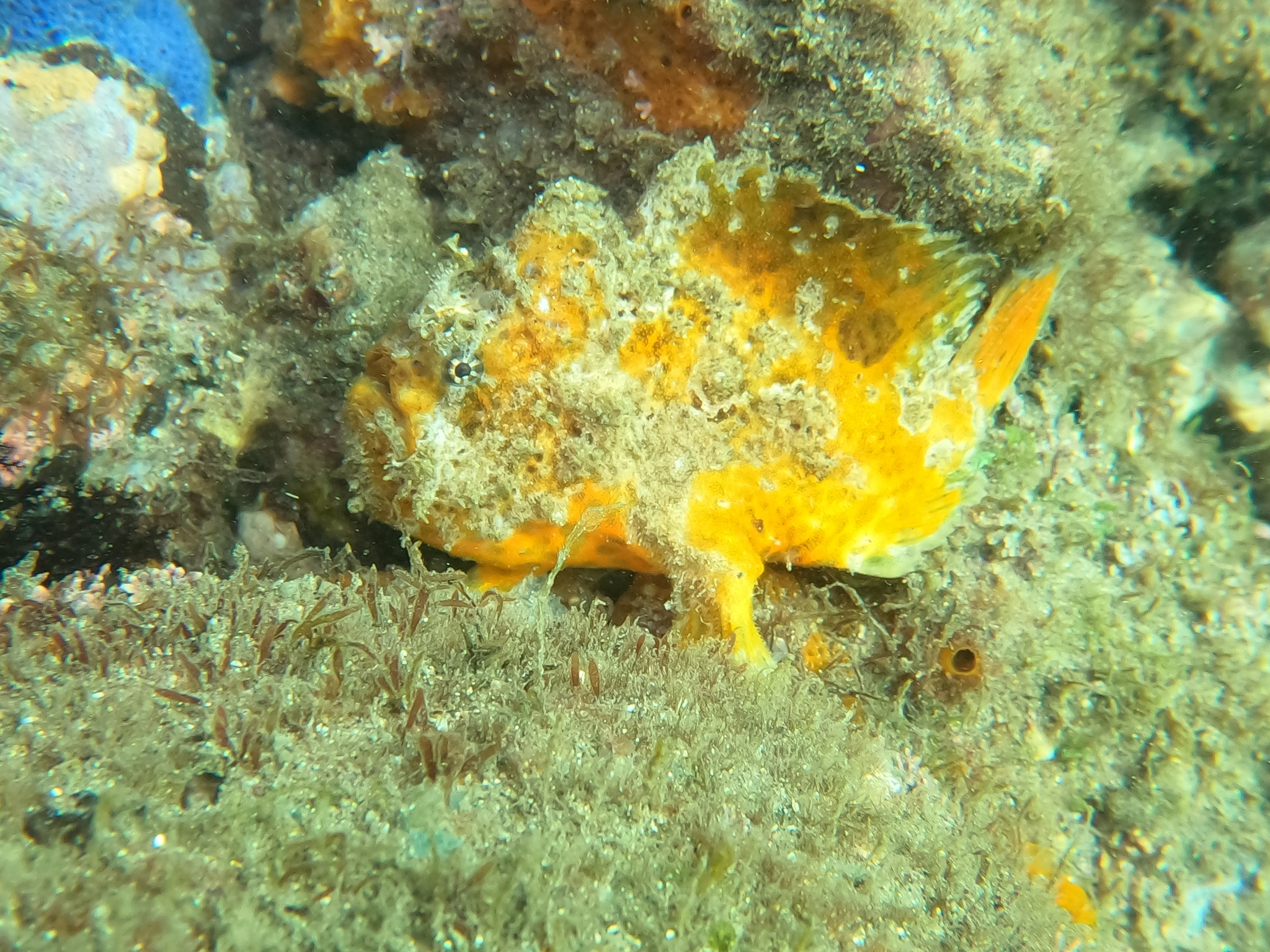

Conservation status
- Least Concern (IUCN 3.1)

Scientific classification
- Kingdom: Animalia
- Phylum: Chordata
- Class: Actinopterygii
- Order: Lophiiformes
- Family: Antennariidae
- Genus: Abantennarius
- Species: A. sanguineus

Binomial name
- Abantennarius sanguineus (Gill, 1863)

Synonyms
- Antennarius sanguineus Gill, 1863; Antennatus sanguineus (Gill, 1863); Antennarius leopardinus Günther, 1864; Antennarius tagus Heller & Snodgrass, 1903

= Abantennarius sanguineus =

Species of fish

Abantennarius sanguineus, the bloody frogfish or sanguine frogfish, is a species of marine ray-finned fish belonging to the family Antennariidae, the frogfishes. The sanguine frogfish is found in the eastern Pacific Ocean.

== Taxonomy ==
Abantennarius sanguineus was first formally described as Antennarius sanguineus in 1863 by the American biologist Theodore Gill with its type locality given as Cape San Lucas innBaja California, Mexico. The 5th edition of Fishes of the World classifies the genus Abantennarius in the family Antennariidae within the suborder Antennarioidei within the order Lophiiformes, the anglerfishes.

== Etymology ==
Abantennarius sanguineus has the genus name Abantennarius which prefixes ab, meaning "away from", onto antennarius, a fish of the family Antennaridae. This is an allusion to the gill opening being positioned away from the base of the pectoral fin, which is typically where it is located in frogfishes. The specific name sanguinus means "blood red", a reference to its red colour in life, although this is actually very variable and ranges from yellow to brown or purple.

== Description ==
Abantennarius sanguineus is a small sized fish which grows up to 8.2 centimetres (3.2 in). Like other members of its family, it has a globulous, extensible body and the soft skin is covered with small dermal spinules. The large mouth of this fish is prognathous and allows it to consume prey its same size. The coloring of the body is variable and ranges from yellow, or yellow brown, to reddish with brown spotting and mottling. The ventral part is covered with dark spots and an ocellus can be observed up before the caudal peduncle.

The first dorsal spine, called the "illicium", is modified and is used as a fishing rod. Its extremity is endowed with a characteristic esca (lure). This latter should look like a small fish and has a cluster of dark swellings and long filaments. The pectoral fin resembles a limb and has an elbow like joint and has a broad connection to the body. The gill opening is to the rear and underneath the base of the pectoral fin. The rear edges of the dorsal and anal fins are connected to the caudal peduncle.

== Distribution ==
Abantennarius sanguineus lives in the tropical and subtropical waters from the oriental Pacific Ocean area, from the Gulf of California to Chile; including Revillagigedos, Clipperton, Cocos, Malpelo and the Galapagos islands.

== Habitat ==
Abantennarius sanguineus is found on rocky reef slopes always close to a shelter such as a hole or recesses to a 40 metres (130 ft) depth range and with an average occurrence at 20 metres (66 ft) depth.

== Feeding ==
As all frogfishes, Abantennarius sanguineus is a voracious carnivore which can attack all small animals that pass within its "strike range"; mainly fishes but sometimes even congeners. Its prey can have size close to its own.

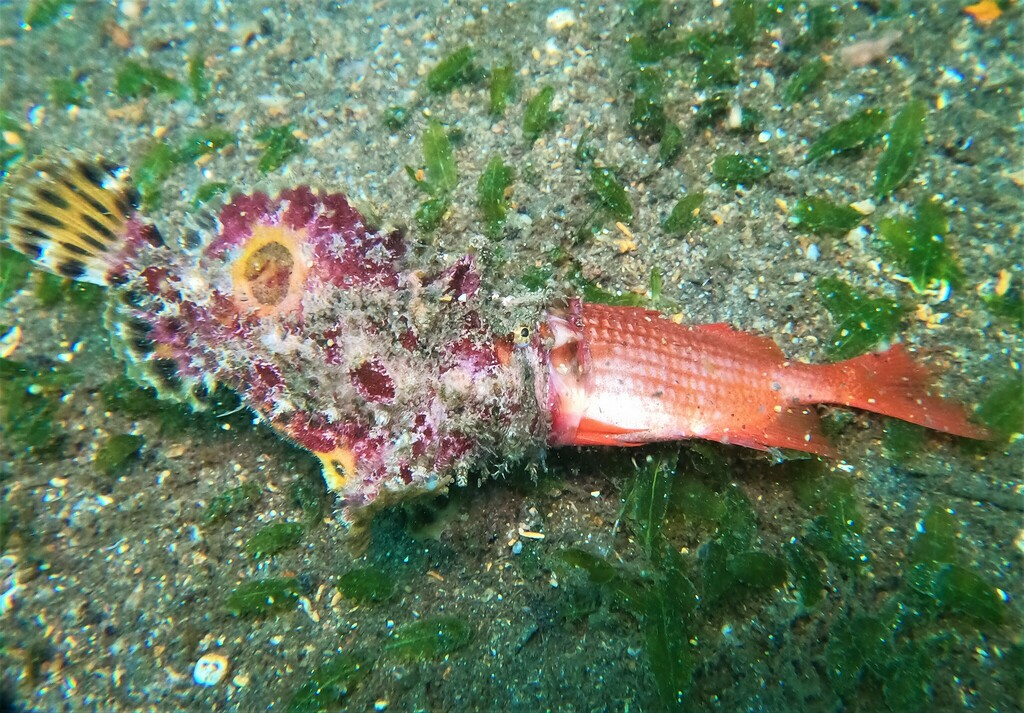
Abantennarius sanguineus with prey

== Behaviour ==
Abantennarius sanguineus, like other members of its family, has a benthic and solitary lifestyle. They gather during mating period but do not tolerate each other any more after the act of fertilization. The male can kill or eat the female if it stays close to it. A single female can release up to 300,000 eggs which form a floating raft which remains buoyant until the eggs hatch after a few days.
