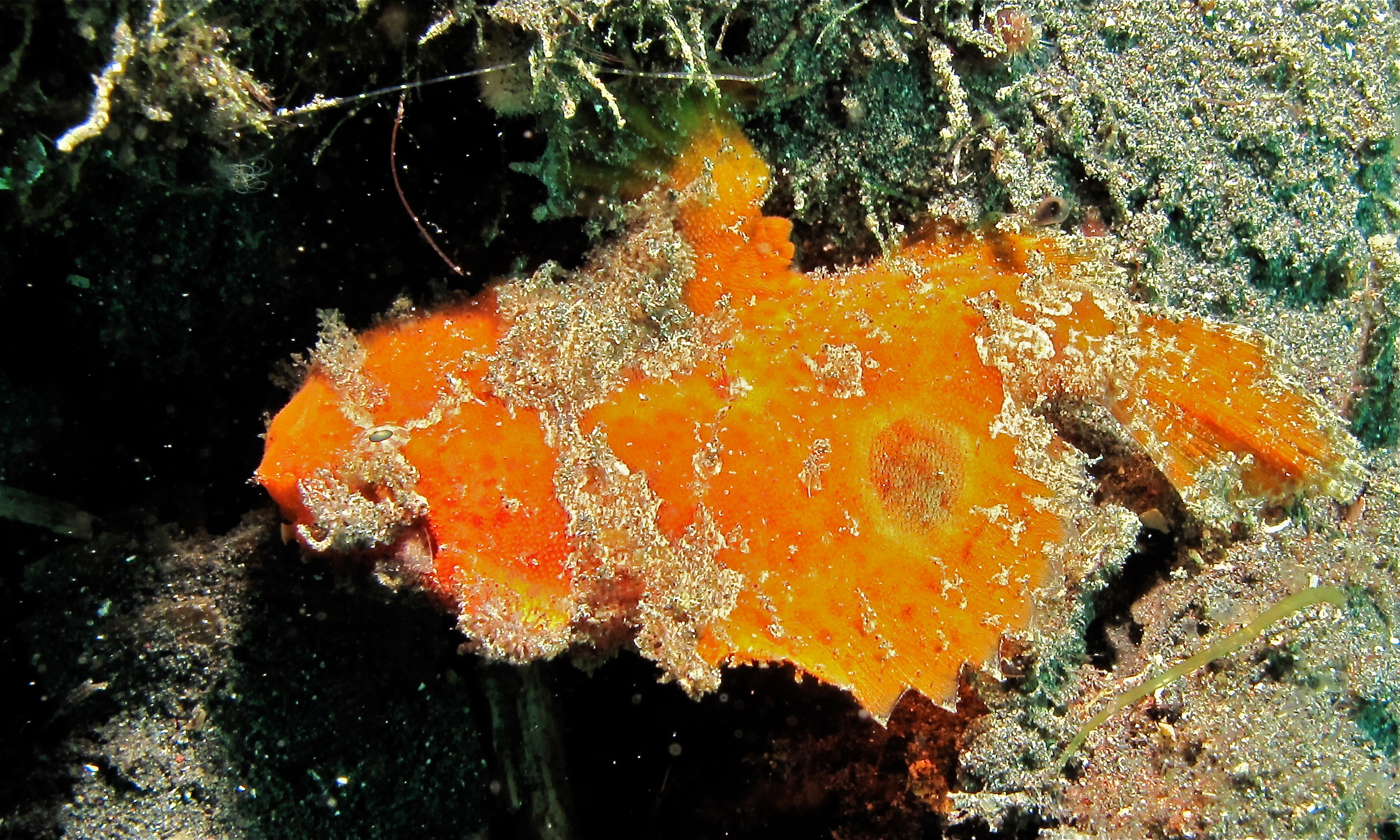

Conservation status
- Least Concern (IUCN 3.1)

Scientific classification
- Kingdom: Animalia
- Phylum: Chordata
- Class: Actinopterygii
- Order: Lophiiformes
- Family: Antennariidae
- Genus: Abantennarius
- Species: A. nummifer

Binomial name
- Abantennarius nummifer (G. Cuvier, 1817)

Synonyms
- Chironectes nummifer Cuvier, 1817; Antennarius nummifer (Cuvier, 1817); Antennatus nummifer (Cuvier, 1817); Chironectes chlorostygma Valenciennes, 1837; Chironectes bicornis Lowe, 1839; Antennarius sanguifluus D. S. Jordan, 1902

= Spotfin frogfish =

Species of fish

The spotfin frogfish (Abantennarius nummifer), also known as the big-spot angler, coin-bearing frogfish, darkspot frogfish, ocellated angler, ocellated fringed fishing frog, opulent frogfish, spotfin angler or white-finger anglerfish, is a species ray-finned fish belonging to the family Antennariidae, the frogfishes. The spotfin frogfish is found in scattered locations the eastern Atlantic, Indian and western Pacific Oceans.

== Taxonomy ==
The spotfin frogfish was first formally described as Chironectes nummifer by the French zoologist Georges Cuvier with its type locality being unknown. The 5th edition of Fishes of the World classifies the genus Abantennarius in the family Antennariidae within the suborder Antennarioidei within the order Lophiiformes, the anglerfishes.

== Etymology ==
The spotfin frogfish has the genus name Abantennarius which prefixes ab, meaning "away from", onto antennarius, a fish of the family Antennaridae. This is an allusion to the gill opening being positioned away from the base of the pectoral fin, which is typically where it is located in frogfishes. The specific name nummifer is a compound of nummis, meaning "coin", and fero, which means "to bear". This is an allusion to the large brown spot on the second dorsal fin.

== Description ==
The spotfin frogfish has 3 dorsal spines and a second dorsal fin which contains 12 or 13 soft rays while the anal fin contains 7 or 8 soft rays. The iliicium is about the same length as the second dorsal spine and bears an esca is bulb shaped with filaments running from it and it resembles a fat shrimp. It has a caudal peduncle and the rear of the dorsal and anal fins are connected to the outer rays of the caudal fin by a membrane. The skin has no scales but is densely covered forked spinules. The pectoral fins are prehensile, have an elbow-like joint and have the gill opening on or near their base. The overall colour may be yellow, rusty, pink or red with a brown or reddish brown head, fading to brown or greenish brown on the body and fines. There is a scattering of irregular, greenish white blotches over the whole body. The base of the second dorsal fin almost always has a dark spot surrounded by an indistinct greenish ring. This species has a maximum total length of 13 cm (5.1 in).

== Distribution and habitat ==
The spotfin frogfish is found in the eastern and central Atlantic Ocean where it has been recorded from the Azores, Madeira, the Canary Islands and Saint Helena. In the Indian Ocean it has been recorded from the Red Sea south to Aliwal Shoal in South Africa, Madagascar, Mascarenes, Seychelles, Maldives, the Persian Gulf east to the Society Islands and Hawaiian Islands, south to Australia and northern New Zealand and north to Japan. It is associated with reefs and is found as deep as 293 m (961 ft), although it is typically found as depths of less than 20 m (66 ft), with the Atlantic populations in deeper waters than those in the Pacific. t can be found in the intertidal zone on reefs in lagoons and on seaward reefs.

== Biology ==
The spotfin frogfish is oviparous, the females laying egg masses within ribbons of gelatinous mucus, known as an "egg rafts" or "veils". An egg raft laid in captivity was found estimated to hold 48,000 eggs. The larvae are planktonic and settle onto the reef after 1 or 2 months. It is piscivorous, attracting prey to within striking range of the mouth with its shrimp-like esca.
