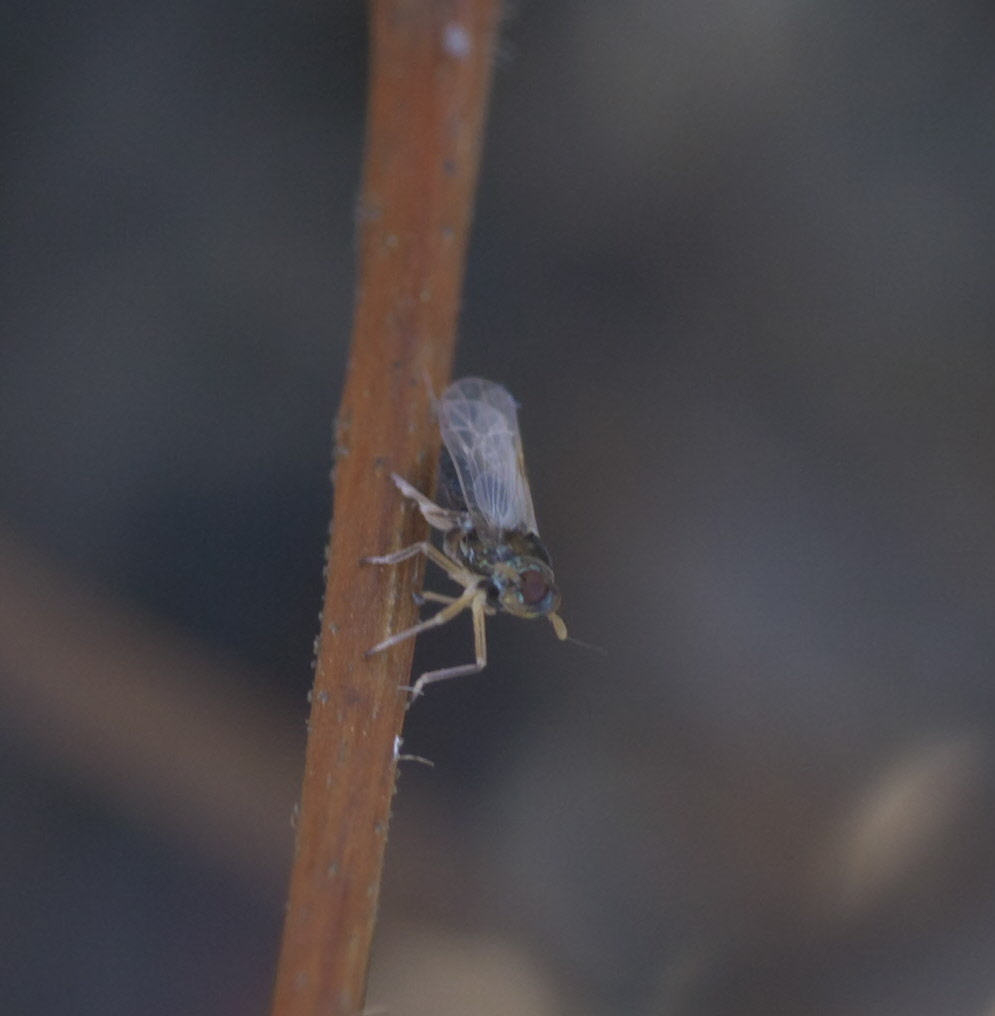
- Pissonotus piceus

Scientific classification
- Domain: Eukaryota
- Kingdom: Animalia
- Phylum: Arthropoda
- Class: Insecta
- Order: Hemiptera
- Suborder: Auchenorrhyncha
- Infraorder: Fulgoromorpha
- Family: Delphacidae
- Tribe: Delphacini
- Genus: Pissonotus; Van Duzee, 1897

Species
- See text

= Pissonotus =

Genus of true bugs

Pissonotus is a genus of delphacid planthoppers in the family Delphacidae. There are at least 40 described species in Pissonotus.

== Species ==
- Pissonotus abdominalis (Crawford, 1914)
- Pissonotus absenta Caldwell in Caldwell and Martorell, 1951
- Pissonotus agrestis Morgan and Beamer, 1949
- Pissonotus albivultus Morgan & Beamer, 1949
- Pissonotus albovenosus Osborn, 1935
- Pissonotus aphidioides Van Duzee, 1897
- Pissonotus aquilonius Morgan and Beamer, 1949
- Pissonotus basalis Van Duzee, 1897
- Pissonotus binotatus Spooner, 1912
- Pissonotus boliviensis Bartlett in Bartlett and Dietz, 2000
- Pissonotus brevistilus Bartlett in Bartlett and Dietz, 2000
- Pissonotus brunneus Van Duzee, 1897
- Pissonotus canadensis Bartlett in Bartlett and Dietz, 2000
- Pissonotus concolor Bartlett in Bartlett and Dietz, 2000
- Pissonotus decussatus Bartlett in Bartlett and Dietz, 2000
- Pissonotus delicatus Van Duzee, 1897
- Pissonotus dentatus Morgan and Beamer, 1949
- Pissonotus divergens Bartlett in Bartlett and Dietz, 2000
- Pissonotus dorsalis Van Duzee, 1897
- Pissonotus festucae Bartlett in Bartlett and Dietz, 2000
- Pissonotus flabellatus (Ball, 1903)
- Pissonotus frontalis (Crawford, 1914)
- Pissonotus guttatus Spooner, 1912
- Pissonotus haywardi Muir, 1929
- Pissonotus jamaicensis Bartlett in Bartlett and Dietz, 2000
- Pissonotus lactofascius Morgan and Beamer, 1949
- Pissonotus marginatus Van Duzee, 1897
- Pissonotus melanurus Van Duzee, 1917
- Pissonotus merides Morgan and Beamer, 1949
- Pissonotus minutus Beamer, 1952
- Pissonotus muiri Metcalf, 1943
- Pissonotus neotropicus (Muir, 1926)
- Pissonotus niger Morgan & Beamer, 1949
- Pissonotus nigriculus Morgan and Beamer, 1949
- Pissonotus nigridorsum Metcalf, 1923
- Pissonotus nitens (Van Duzee, 1909)
- Pissonotus paludosus Morgan and Beamer, 1949
- Pissonotus paraguayensis Bartlett in Bartlett and Dietz, 2000
- Pissonotus piceus (Van Duzee, 1894)
- Pissonotus quadripustulatus (Van Duzee, 1909)
- Pissonotus radiolus Bartlett in Bartlett and Dietz, 2000
- Pissonotus rubrilatus Morgan and Beamer, 1949
- Pissonotus spatulatus Bartlett in Bartlett and Dietz, 2000
- Pissonotus spooneri Morgan and Beamer, 1949
- Pissonotus substitua (Walker, 1851)
- Pissonotus tessellatus (Ball, 1926)
- Pissonotus tumidus Morgan & Beamer, 1949
