= Antennatus strigatus =

Conservation status
- Least Concern (IUCN 3.1)

Scientific classification
- Kingdom: Animalia
- Phylum: Chordata
- Class: Actinopterygii
- Order: Lophiiformes
- Family: Antennariidae
- Genus: Antennatus
- Species: A. strigatus

Binomial name
- Antennatus strigatus (Gill, 1863)

Synonyms
- Antennarius strigatus Gill, 1863

Species of frogfish

Antennatus strigatus, the bandtail frogfish, is a species of marine ray-finned fish belonging to the family Antennariidae, the frog fishes. This species is found in the eastern Pacific Ocean.

== Taxonomy ==
Antennatus strigatus was first formally described as Antennarius strigatus in 1863 by the American biologist Theodore Gill with its type locality given as Cape San Lucas in Baja California. In 1957 Leonard Peter Schultz designated this species as the type species of the new genus Antennatus. The 5th edition of Fishes of the World classifies the genus Antennatus in the family Antennariidae within the suborder Antennarioidei within the order Lophiiformes, the anglerfishes.

== Etymology ==
The genus name Antennatus is derived from "given an antenna", an allusion to first dorsal spine being adapted into a tentacle on the snout used as a lure to attract prey. The species epithet, strigatus, means "streaked" or "striped", a reference to the irregular dark streaks on this species.

== Description ==
Antennatus strigatus has a slightly compressed rather globose body. The mouth is large and points upwards. The illicium lacks spinules and is roughly equal in length to the second dorsal spine, tapers to a point and has a small, lobe-like esca. The second dorsal spine is straight and free of the skin on the head while the third dorsal spine is upward pointing, immobile and is encased in a protuberance within the skin. They have pectoral fins which resemble limbs and which have an elbow-like joint, the pectoral fin has a broad connection to the body. There are small round gill openings and these are located under and to the rear of the base of the pectoral fin. There is no caudal peduncle and the posterior margins of the dorsal and anal fins are joined body at the base of caudal fin. The skin on the body is rough to the touch as it has a dense covering of bifurcated spicules that are grouped together in wart-like structures. The overall color varies through yellowish to pinkish red with dark brown to blackish streaks and lines, some individuals may be almost entirely yellow at times. This species has a maximum published standard length of 8 cm (3.1 in).

== Distribution and habitat ==
Antennatus strigatus is found in the central eastern Pacific from the central Gulf of California south to Ecuador, including all the Revillagigedo Islands, Cocos Island, Malpelo Island and the Galapagos Islands. It is found at depths between 0 and 38 m (0 and 125 ft), although they are not normally found at depths greater than 15 m (49 ft), in small crevices in rocky reefs, in particular in vertical walls.
