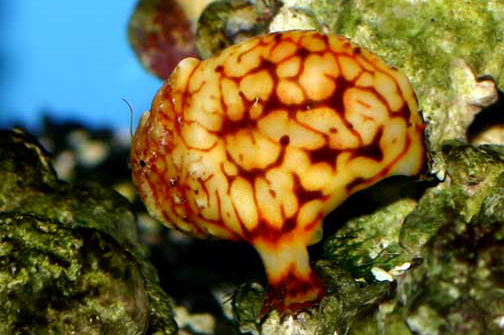

Conservation status
- Least Concern (IUCN 3.1)

Scientific classification
- Kingdom: Animalia
- Phylum: Chordata
- Class: Actinopterygii
- Division: Teleostei
- Order: Lophiiformes
- Family: Antennariidae
- Genus: Antennatus
- Species: A. tuberosus

Binomial name
- Antennatus tuberosus (Cuvier, 1817)

Synonyms
- Chironectes tuberosus Cuvier, 1817; Antennarius bigibbus Commerson, 1817; Antennarius tuberosus (Cuvier, 1817); Antennarius unicornis Bennett, 1827; Chironectes reticulatus Eydoux & Souleyet, 1850; Lophius bigibbus (Commerson, 1817)

= Antennatus tuberosus =

Species of fish

Antennatus tuberosus, the tuberculate anglerfish, pygmy angler, pygmy frogfish or tuberculated frogfish, is a species of marine ray-finned fish belonging to the family Antennariidae, the frogfishes. This fish is found in the Indian and Pacific Oceans.

== Taxonomy ==
Antennatus tuberosus was first formally described Chironectes tuberosus in 1807 by the French zoologist Georges Cuvier with its type locality given as Mauritius. The 5th edition of Fishes of the World classifies the genus Antennatus in the family Antennariidae within the suborder Antennarioidei within the order Lophiiformes, the anglerfishes.

== Etymology ==
Antennatus tuberosus has the genus name Antennatus is derived from "given an antenna", an allusion to first dorsal spine being adapted into a tentacle on the snout used as a lure to attract prey. The specific name, tuberosus, means "covered with lumps or tumours", assumed to be a reference to row of bumps above the eye and along the back.

== Description ==
Antennatus tuberosus has a long illicium, which is 50 to 100% longer than the second dorsal spine, which tapers to a simple filamentous esca, or lure. The second dorsal spine is a cylinder while the third spine is enclosed in a bump in the skin. There is no caudal peduncle. There are no scales in the skin but the skin is thick and firm and has a dense covering of bifurcated spinules. The limb-like pectoral fins has a joint resembling an elbow. The rear of the dorsal and anal fins are connected to the upper rays of the caudal fin. The colour of the body varies but is normally cream, yellow, or slate grey, with dark-brown reticulations and marbling. The head has a whitish, crusty pattern on the face. The anal and caudal fins have an obvious dark-brown band and dark bands on the margins. This species has a maximum published standard length of 9 cm (3.5 in).

== Distribution and habitat ==
Antennatus tuberosus is found in the Indian and Pacific Oceans from Mozambique and Madagascar east to Hawaii and the Pitcairn Islands, north to the Ryukyu Islands and south to New Caledonia and Tonga. In Australia on the northern Great Barrier Reef. This species is found at depths down to 73 m (240 ft) on onshore coral reefs.

== Biology ==
Antennatus tuberosus is an ambush predator that lies in wait, camouflaged in the reef and uses the illicium to lure prey within striking range of the large mouth. This is a solitary species that is often found on the branches of branched corals, It is oviparous, the females lay eggs in ribbon-like gelatinous masses called egg rafts or veils which float.

== Utilisation ==
Antennatus tuberosus is occasionally collected for the aquarium trade.
