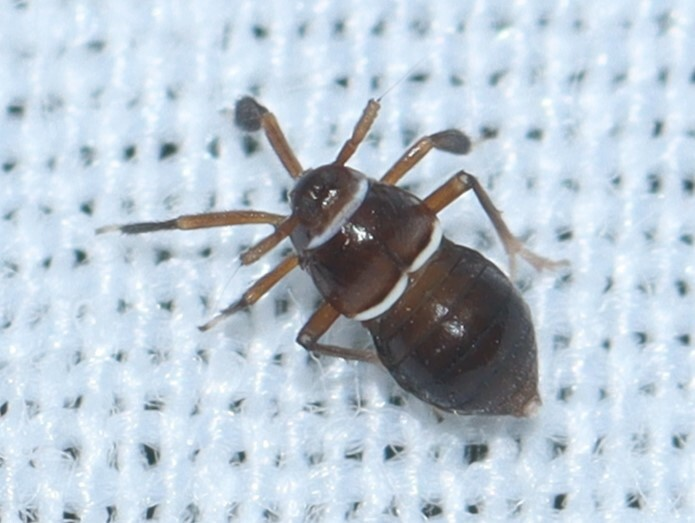

Scientific classification
- Kingdom: Animalia
- Phylum: Arthropoda
- Clade: Pancrustacea
- Class: Insecta
- Order: Hemiptera
- Suborder: Auchenorrhyncha
- Infraorder: Fulgoromorpha
- Family: Delphacidae
- Genus: Pissonotus
- Species: P. nitens

Binomial name
- Pissonotus nitens (Van Duzee, 1909)

= Pissonotus nitens =

Species of true bug

Pissonotus nitens is a species of delphacid planthopper in the family Delphacidae. It is found in the Caribbean and North America.
