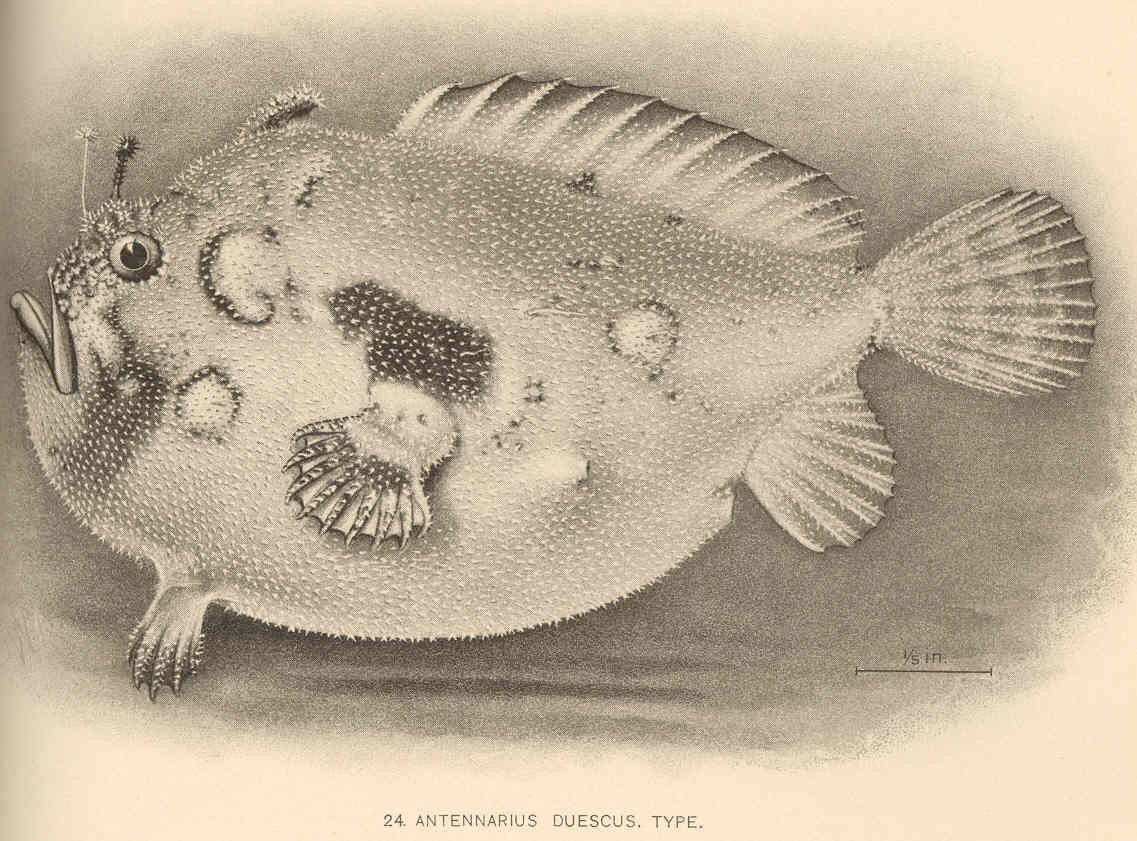

Conservation status
- Least Concern (IUCN 3.1)

Scientific classification
- Kingdom: Animalia
- Phylum: Chordata
- Class: Actinopterygii
- Order: Lophiiformes
- Family: Antennariidae
- Genus: Abantennarius
- Species: A. duescus

Binomial name
- Abantennarius duescus (Snyder, 1904)

Synonyms
- Antennarius duescus Snyder, 1904; Antennatus duescus (Snyder, 1904)

= Abantennarius duescus =

Species of fish

Abantennarius duescus, the side-jet frogfish, is a species of marine ray-finned fish belonging to the family Antennariidae, the frogfishes. The side-jet frog fish has a scattered distribution in the western Pacific Ocean.

== Taxonomy ==
Abantennarius duescus was first formally described as Antennarius duescus by the American ichthyologist John Otterbein Snyder with its type locality given as between Maui and Lanai in the Hawaiian Islands. In 1957 Leonard Peter Schultz proposed the genus Abantennarius and designated A. duescus as its type species. The 5th edition of Fishes of the World classifies the genus Abantennarius in the family Antennariidae within the suborder Antennarioidei within the order Lophiiformes, the anglerfishes.

== Etymology ==
Abantennarius duescus has the genus name Abantennarius which prefixes ab, meaning "away from", onto antennarius, a fish of the family Antennaridae. This is an allusion to the gill opening being positioned away from the base of the pectoral fin, which is typically where it is located in frogfishes. The specific name duescus means "two baits", a reference Snyder did not explain. It is thought that it refers to the possession of two escae, the typical one which is the first dorsal-fin spine, then a thinner second dorsal spine with a club-like structure on its tip which resembles an esca.

== Distribution and habitat ==
Abantennarius duescus has been recorded from widely scattered location is the western Pacific Ocean, these include Hawaii (including Midway and Johnston Atoll); Kakaban, Flores and Komodo islands in Indonesia; Madang and Milne Bay in Papua New Guinea; Ouvéa Island in New Caledonia; and Fiji. It is found at depths 10 and 137 m (33 and 449 ft), although the mean depth at which it has been recorded is 23 m (75 ft), on rocky and coral reefs.
