= Hungry Bay Nature Reserve =

Nature reserve in Bermuda

- Location within Bermuda
- Location: Hungry Bay Nature Reserve
- Nearest city: Hamilton
- Coordinates: 32°17′25″N 64°45′32″W
- Area: 2.01 hectares (5.0 acres)
- Established: 1986, 1999 (Ramsar site)
- Visitors: NA (in NA)
- Governing body: Department of Conservation Services, Government of Bermuda

Ramsar Wetland
- Official name: Hungry Bay Mangrove Swamp
- Designated: 11 May 1999
- Reference no.: 987

Hungry Bay Nature Reserve is a nature reserve on the east coast of Bermuda. It was established in 1986. It is considered the best example of coastal mangrove swamp on the island. It includes the Hungry Bay area and the largest mangrove coastal swamp in Bermuda. It is protected by a Tree preservation order (T.P.O.) and designated as an official Nature Reserve within the Parks system of Bermuda.

The Hungry Bay Mangrove Swamp Reserve, a wetland site, is one of the seven Ramsar Sites in Bermuda. This designation recognises its international importance as a northerly mangrove swamp, as a habitat for its native crustaceans and as an important destination for migratory birds. Most of the reserve consists of mangrove swamp, while in the southern part there is a small area of saltmarsh. Much damage was done to the site by a storm in 2003 and residents have expressed concern about possible environmental damage resulting from pollution from the village of Seabright.

== History ==
The reserve was proposed as a National Nature Reserve under the Development and Planning Act of 1974. It was part of the Development Plan of 1983. While the mangroves are under the Tree Preservation Order, the reserve in general is decreed as a National Reserve under the Bermuda National Parks Act of 1986. The Hungry Bay Mangrove Swamp Reserve is one of the seven Ramsar Sites in Bermuda. It was approved as a Ramsar site of international importance on 10 May 1999, meeting the criteria (1, 2, 3, 4 and 8) for its unique characteristics. Its significance is due to being the largest northerly mangrove swamp in the Atlantic Ocean, the many migratory bird species which visit during winter, and the many native crustacean species, including the endangered terrestrial hermit crab (Coenobita clypeatus) and giant land crab (Cardisoma guanhumi).

During Hurricane Fabian in September 2003, the outer (western) third of the swamp, accounting for 25–30% of the total area of mangroves, suffered total destruction. Global warming has also caused rise in tidal levels resulting in damage to the swamps. More recently, residents have begun to voice concerns over the Seabright sewage outflow, which enters Hungry Bay itself. A resident of the Bay noted the persistent appearance of a "shiny slick" emanating from Seabright extending to the "reef-line a few hundred yards off".

== Geography ==
Bermuda's largest tidal mangrove swamp is situated in a sea bay on the east coast of Bermuda, in an enclosed coast with a narrow opening from the sea, Hungry Bay. Reported as the most northerly mangrove swamp in the world, it is shallow with a depth of about 1 metre (3 ft 3 in) during high tide. The area is small at 2.01 hectares (5.0 acres), of which 99% is of tidal mangrove forest and the balance 1% is made up of permanent brackish marshes. The soil conditions comprise clay, mud, peat and sand. It has perennial source of water and is of water quality varying from brackish to mixosaline, saline and euhaline in different zones.

Climatic conditions in the reserve is subtropical with mild temperatures with humidity. Storms and gales are a common feature during winter. The reserve consists of dense forest of red and black mangrove trees. A large number of sea water channels flow through the area which rise and fall with the tides. These tidal channels are an important habitat for small fish. Crabs and other marine creatures are found here. The trees are the habitat for many species of birds. Snails and insects are commonly found in the reserve.

The reserve can be reached by road, though access is limited, or by boat travelling directly through the bay. The reserve operates a small wharf capable of receiving boat traffic.

== Flora ==
Vegetation in the mangrove swamps consists primarily of black mangrove (Avicennia germinans) and red mangrove (Rhizophora mangle). Other species of trees reported around the mangroves are buttonwood (Conocarpus erectus), rush (Juncus acutus), sea purslane (Sesuvium portulacastrum), sea ox-eye (Borrichia arborescens), sea lavender (Limonium caroliniatum), Paspalum vaginatum, Sporobolus virginicus, woody glasswort (Salicornia perennis) and West Indian grass (Eustachys petraea). Tropical mangrove swamp characterises the northern areas of the reserve while the southern areas primarily represent temperate saltmarsh.

Invasive plants, notably among them casuarina, are adversely affecting the growth of the mangrove swamp, and therefore in addition giant land and hermit crabs, endemic snail species. Habitat restoration measures are underway to retain the mangroves and other native species.

== Fauna ==
The faunal species reported from the mangrove swamp include several species of crabs: the giant land crab (Cardisoma guanhumi) ( only two colonies exists in the upper regions of the swamp), the terrestrial hermit crab (Coenobita clypeatus) (54 individuals recorded in 1990), and the mangrove crab (Goniopsis cruentatus).

=== Avifauna ===
Significant avifauna reported in the reserve are the great blue heron (Ardea herodias), yellow-crowned night heron (Nyctanassa violacea), snowy egret (Egretta thula), mallard (Anas platyrhynchus), belted kingfisher, Megaceryle alcyon and northern waterthrush (Parkesia noveboracensis), which are all wintering bird species. Feral pigeons, which are displacing tropic birds from their nesting sites in cliff-holes and ledges, need to be eliminated from the reserve to preserve the native species of birds, according to efforts made to control their population thus far.
