= Abantennarius analis =

Conservation status
- Least Concern (IUCN 3.1)

Scientific classification
- Kingdom: Animalia
- Phylum: Chordata
- Class: Actinopterygii
- Order: Lophiiformes
- Family: Antennariidae
- Genus: Abantennarius
- Species: A. analis

Binomial name
- Abantennarius analis L. P. Schultz, 1957

Synonyms
- Antennarius analis (Schultz, 1957); Antennatus analis (Schultz, 1957)

Species of fish

Abantennarius analis, the tailjet frogfish, tailjet anglerfish or dwarf frogfish, is a species of marine ray-finned fish belonging to the family Antennariidae, the frogfishes. This species is found in the eastern Indian Ocean and the western Pacific Ocean.

== Taxonomy ==
Abentennarius snalis was first formally described in 1957 by the American ichthyologist Leonard Peter Schultz with its type locality given as Waikiki Reef off Oahu in the Hawaiian Islands. The 5th edition of Fishes of the World classifies the genus Abantennarius in the family Antennariidae within the suborder Antennarioidei within the order Lophiiformes, the anglerfishes.

== Etymology ==
Abantennarius analis has the genus name Abantennarius which prefixes ab, meaning "away from", onto antennarius, a fish of the family Antennaridae. This is an allusion to the gill opening being positioned away from the base of the pectoral fin, which is typically where it is located in frogfishes. The specific name analis means "anal", an allusion to the gill opening being positioned near the base of the anal fin.

== Description ==
Abantennarius analis has 3 dorsal spines and a second dorsal fin which is supported by 12, rarely 13, soft rays while the anal fin typically contains 6 or, typically, 7 soft rays. The illicium is double the length of the second dorsal spine with an elongated esca which has a number of filamentous appendages and darl swellings at its base. The openings to the gills are located quite far back next to the base of the anal fin. It does not have a caudal peduncle. The rear parts of the dorsal and anal fin are connected to the caudal fin by a membrane. The pectoral fins are prehensile and have a joint which resembles an elbow. The skin has a dense covering of forked spines. The overall colour is mottled light grey with a yellowish hue on the fins. The tailjet frogfish has a maximum published standard length of 7.8 cm (3.1 in).

== Distribution and habitat ==
Abantennarius analis is found in the eastern Indian and Western Pacific Oceans. It ranges from Cartier Island, Christmas Island and Rowley Shoals north as far as the Ryukyu Islands and east to the Society Islands and Hawaii. The tailjet frogfish is associated with reefs at depths between 2 and 21 m (6 ft 7 in and 68 ft 11 in), where they shelter in tidal pools, among rubble and in crevices.

== Biology ==
Abantennarius analis is a gonochoristic species which has external fertilisation. The females lay the 1mm diameter eggs in a pelagic raft, this contains thousands of eggs within a gelatinous mass that floats. They are ambush predators, using the first dorsal spine to lure prey within striking range of the mouth. They can vary their colour and pattern to camouflage themselves with the environment.
