= Édouard Le Danois =

French zoologist

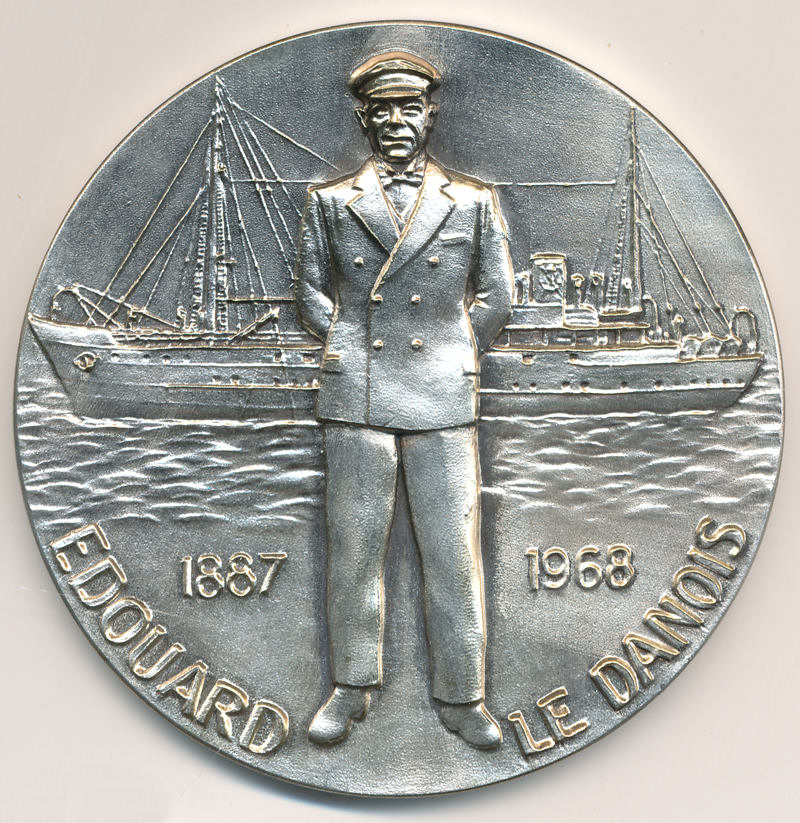
A medal which depicts Édouard Le Danois

Édouard Le Danois (8 April 1887, Brest – 11 June 1968, Saint-Germain-en-Laye) was a French zoologist specialising in marine life. He described many species of fish.
