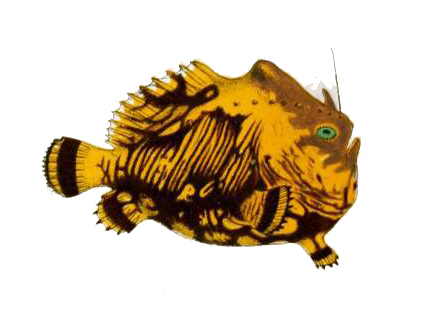
- Antennatus tuberosus

Scientific classification
- Kingdom: Animalia
- Phylum: Chordata
- Class: Actinopterygii
- Order: Lophiiformes
- Family: Antennariidae
- Subfamily: Antennariinae
- Genus: Antennatus; L. P. Schultz, 1957

Type species
- Antennarius strigatus Gill 1863

Species
- see text.

= Antennatus =

Genus of fishes

Antennatus is a genus of marine ray-finned fishes belonging to the family Antennariidae, the frogfishes. The fishes in this genus are found the Indian and Pacific Oceans.

== Taxonomy ==
Antennatus was first proposed as a genus in 1957 by the American ichthyologist Leonard Peter Schultz with Antennarius strigatus designated as the type species. A. strigatus was originally described in 1863 by Theodore Gill with its type locality given as Cape San Lucas in Baja California. Some authorities classify this genus in the subfamily Antennariinae within the family Antennariidae. However, the 5th edition of Fishes of the World does not recognise subfamilies within the Antennariidae, classifying the family within the suborder Antennarioidei within the order Lophiiformes, the anglerfishes.

== Etymology ==
Antennatus means "given an antenna", an allusion to first dorsal spine being adapted into a tentacle on the snout used as a lure to attract prey.

== Species ==
Antennatus currently has four recognised species classified within it:

- Antennatus flagellatus Ohnishi, Iwata & Hiramatsu, 1997 (Whip frogfish)
- Antennatus linearis J. E. Randall & Holcom, 2001 (Pygmy Anglerfish)
- Antennatus strigatus (T. N. Gill, 1863) (Bandtail frogfish)
- Antennatus tuberosus (G. Cuvier, 1817) (Tuberculated frogfish)

== Characteristics ==
Antennatus frogfishes differ from the other genera of frogfishes in their skin being densely covered in bifurcated spinules with no naked patches on the lateral line. The illicium lacks an esca and is not adorned with spinules. The third dorsal pine is not moveable. The dorsal fin contains between 11 and 13 soft rays and the anal fin has between 6 and 8 soft rays while the pectoral fin has 9 to 12 fin rays. These are small frogfishes with the largest species being A. tuberosus with a maximum published standard length of 9 cm (3.5 in).

== Distribution and habitat ==
Antennatusfrogfishes are found in the Indian Ocean from southeastern Africa to the eastern Pacific Ocean off the western coasts of central and south America. These frogfishes are associated with rocky and coral habitats in shallow seas.
