= Abantennarius drombus =

Freckled frogfish

Conservation status
- Least Concern (IUCN 3.1)

Scientific classification
- Kingdom: Animalia
- Phylum: Chordata
- Class: Actinopterygii
- Order: Lophiiformes
- Family: Antennariidae
- Genus: Abantennarius
- Species: A. drombus

Binomial name
- Abantennarius drombus (D.S. Jordan and Evermann, 1903)

Synonyms
- Antennarius drombus D. S. Jordan & Evermann, 1903; Antennarius nexilis Snyder, 1904

Species of fish

Abantennarius drombus, freckled frogfish or Hawaiian freckled frogfish, is a species of marine ray-finned fish belonging to the family Antennariidae, the frogfishes. The freckled frogfish is endemic to the Hawaiian Islands. Because of the fish's expertise in camouflage and small range, there have been few instances of observation and study. Therefore, the description of this fish is heavily inferred from order, family, and genus information.

== Taxonomy ==
This fish was previously identified as Antennarius nexilis but is now formally known as Antennarius drombus. Abantennarius drombus was first formally described in 1903. This fish was originally classified with Antennarius coccineus, or the scarlet frogfish, by the American ichthyologists David Starr Jordan and Barton Warren Evermann with its type locality given a Waikiki on Oahu in Hawaii. This fish was later re-identified by Norton Chang of the Waikiki Aquarium using literature composed by Pietsch and Grobecker and Tinker's Fishes of Hawaii. The key difference between A. coccineus and A. drombus is found within the number of pectoral fin rays, with A. drombus having 12 pectoral rays and A. coccineus having 10. Additional distinguishing characteristics include the color of the esca and abundance of small dark blotches on the body and fins. In 1987, Pietsch and Grobecke synonymized A. drombus with A. coccineus, but it has subsequently been regarded as a valid species. The 5th edition of Fishes of the World classified Abantennarius in the family Antennariidae within the suborder Antennarioidei, which is further nested in the order Lophiiformes, the anglerfishes.

== Etymology ==
Abantennarius drombus has the genus name Abantennarius, which prefixes ab-, meaning "away from", onto antennarius, a fish of the family Antennaridae. This is an allusion to the gill opening being positioned away from the base of the pectoral fin, which is typically where it is located in frogfishes. The specific name drombus was not explained, and it is not known what David Starr Jordan meant by it in this fish or in the genus of Filipino gobies he used this name for.

== Distribution and habitat ==
Frogfish are typically found in a variety of different locations, but often observed at the floor of shallow-water habitats. This distribution is a high contributor to the morphological diversity of fish in this family, as they tend to have coloration patterns allowing them to camouflage with their environment.

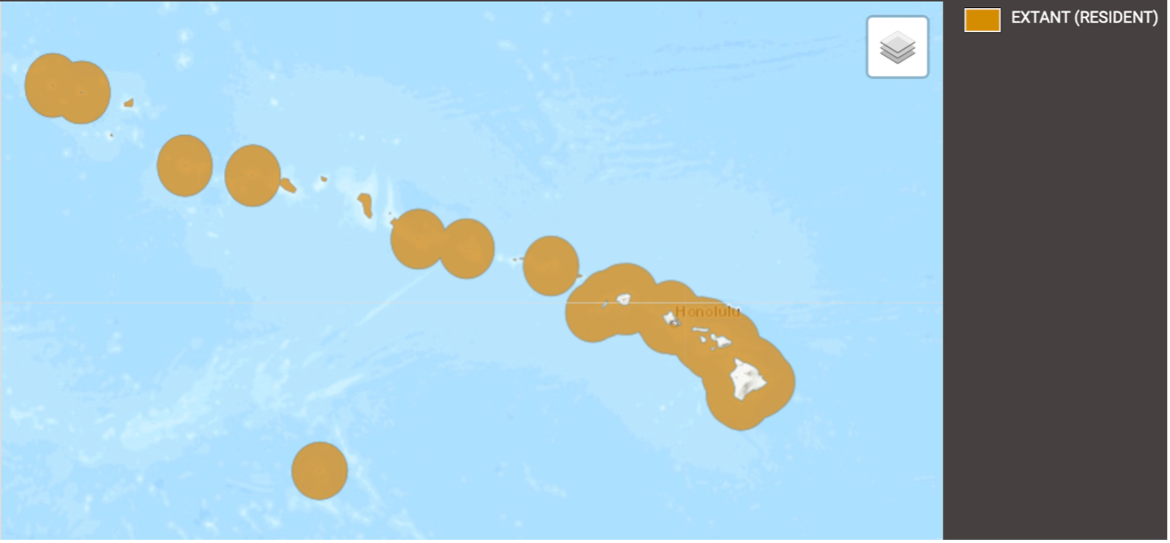

Abantennarius drombus has been found in the western central Pacific Ocean, where it's been seen off Johnston Atoll, Midway Atoll, and the Hawaiian Islands in the North Pacific Ocean. This fish is endemic to the area and restricted to this range. A study surveying reef fish found A. drombus dwelling at the bottom of shallow spur and groove habitats, explaining the coral-like coloration. It is found in shallow waters at depths between 0 and 104 m (0 and 341 ft), typically shallower than 10 m (33 ft) on coral and rocky reefs.

== Description ==
Frogfish are easily identified by their globose body structure and color patterns that match the background of their environment, which is observed in freckled frogfish variations ranging from brown to reddish brown or gray with small dark blotches to match its marine reef habitat. Typically, this fish is marked with small dark blotches, the "freckles" that give it its common name, which are especially obvious on the fins.

There also tends to be sexual dimorphism between males and females for fish within this family; however, there is no literature describing this specific difference in A. drombus. It is likely that these individuals do exhibit sexual dimorphism as it plays a role in the mating rituals observed within Antennariidae.

Generally, fish within the Antennariidae family have a modified first dorsal spine, which is called the illicium. The second dorsal fin is not connected to the head with a membrane and acts as a lure to attract prey, with the shape typically differing between species. The illicium is a key characteristic for fish within this family, working in tandem with their large, cave-like mouth for feeding.

Distinguishing fin characteristics of the freckled frogfish include Abantennarius drombus has 3 dorsal spines, 12 soft rays in the second dorsal fin, and 7 soft rays in the anal fin. A distinguishing feature separating it from A. coccineus is that this species typically has 10 pectoral fin rays, while A. coccineus has 12. In addition, this species has an esca which is not white, whereas in A. coccineus it is white. The illicium is about the same length as the second dorsal spine. The second dorsal fin is not connected to the head with a membrane. There is no caudal peduncle. The color of the freckled frogfish varies from brown to reddish brown or gray, typically marked with small dark blotches, the "freckles" that give it its common name, which are especially obvious on the fins. This species has a maximum published standard length of 12 cm (4.7 in)>The body shape and fin composition measure this species' standard length to be roughly 12 cm (4.7 in).

== Biology and locomotion ==
Since there have been few studies focusing on Antennarius drombus, little is known about their biology, behavior, and life history. However, these things can be inferred from studies and observations on other fish within the Antennariidae family.

Among what can be inferred from family traits are details of fish behavior that come from shared morphological traits. Firstly, because of the leg-like fins, it can be inferred that the freckled frog fish clambers across coral reefs, sand, and other substrates present in the habitat. Their locomotion likely resembles walking much more than it does swimming. As photographed by John P.Hoover and what can be assumed from the fish's coloration, A. drombus seems to spend a fair amount of time remaining stationary. Its leg-like fins assist in this, allowing it to hold its position among the reef or rocks in its habitat. Other observations of frogfish have found that they also use jet propulsion while swimming, likely to move quickly away from predator.

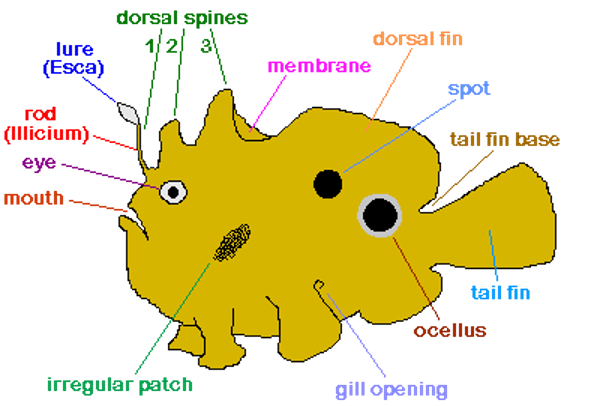

Moreover, the shared family morphology of a large cave-like mouth and the presence of an illicuim help to infer information about the feeding behavior of A. drombus. Previous studies looking at fish in the Antennaridae family have noted these fish slowly stalking their prey, then remaining stationary and using the illicuim (or lure) to draw their prey in. Feeding observations in frogfish show that these fish will display their lure and wiggle it to catch the attention of other fish or crustaceans. Once the prey is close enough, the frogfish will capture it with gape and suck feeding. It has been discovered that froggish can enlarge their mouths by a factor of 12 within 6 milliseconds, making this an effective way of feeding on any size or type of prey that is attracted by their lure.

== Mating behavior ==
In addition to assumptions made from morphological features, the mating behavior of A. drombus can be predicted using mating observations from other frogfish species. The study of reference for this prediction describes mating behavior observed in Antennarius stratus or, or the hairy frogfish. Although closely related, it's important to note that differences in size and habitat likely contribute to differences in the mating ritual and behavior.

To attract a female, the sexually dimorphic smaller male will swim around the female, changing color and deploying its dorsal and anal fins in a vibrating dance. This ritual took place over 4 days, with the male changing color every day and remaining the same color on the third day. It was also noted that the male is aggressive towards the female during courtship. After successful courting, the female will undergo an increase in size, followed by the excretion of a mucus band. Within this mucus band are eggs arranged in two groups of 3. Succeeding this excretion, the female returns to her original size and goes into a state of torpor. In response, the male will swim around this band, rubbing it with his snout and fins. Finally the male will swim over the mucus band and fertilize the eggs. As mentioned previously, since A. drombus and A. stratus are found within the same family, their mating behavior is likely similar, but it cannot be assumed that they are the same. Looking at the mating ritual of A. stratus can allow for the inference of what potential male-female interactions between A. drombus are, and what the steps to mating within this family may look like.

== Cultural significance ==
Unlike other fish families, those in Antennariidae are not featured in folklore, historical narratives, or art. Frogfish are typically celebrated for their uniqueness and unusual appearance, but other than interest in their strange features, they are not culturally significant.

== Conservation status ==
This is a native fish of the Hawaiian archipelago in the North Pacific Ocean. In 2022, the IUCN Red List declared that the Hawaiian freckled frogfish is of least concern. Due to a lack of information in the published literature about this fish, it's difficult to truly determine if this species is at sustainable numbers.
