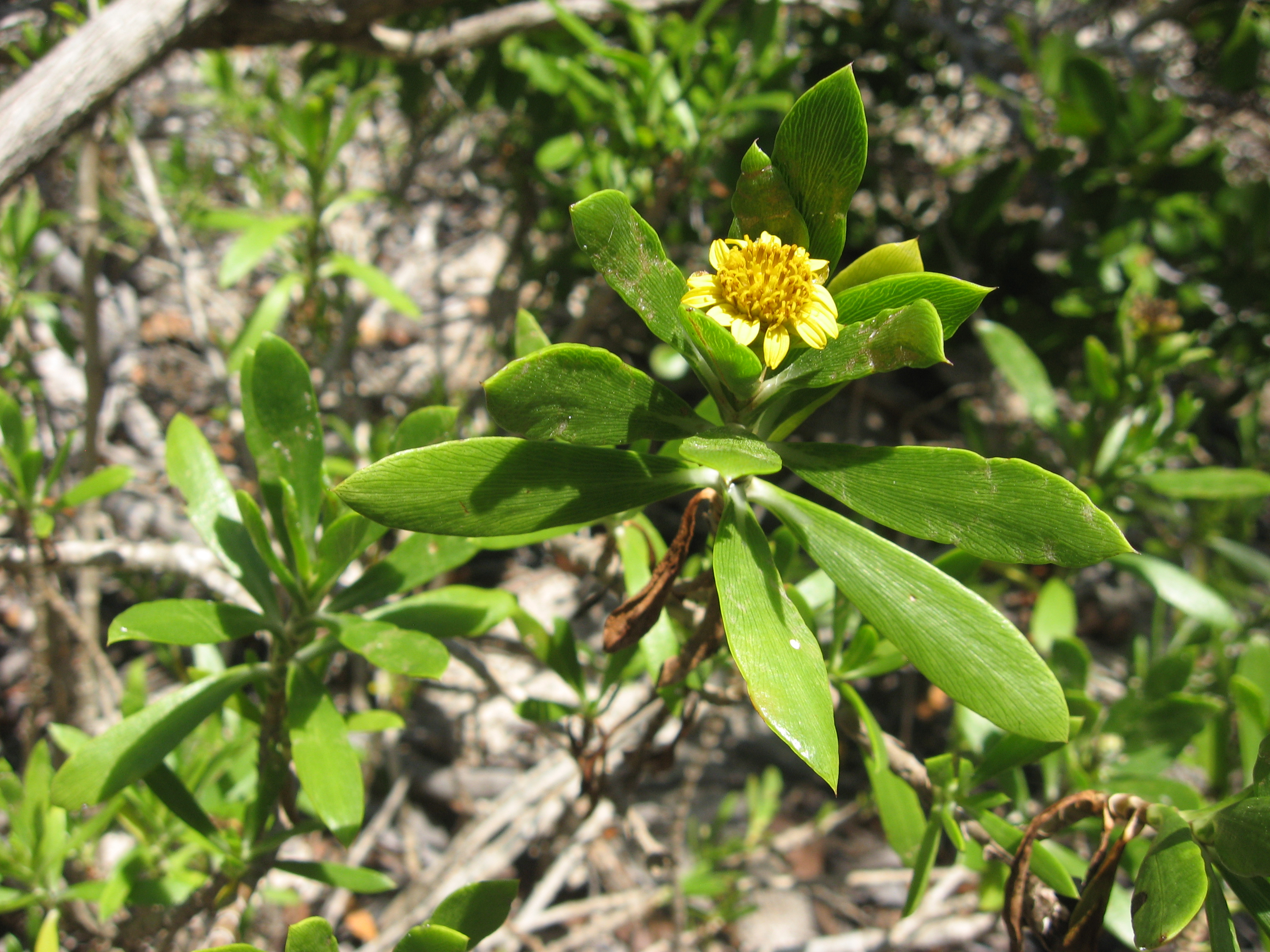

Conservation status
- Least Concern (IUCN 3.1)

- Apparently Secure (NatureServe)

Scientific classification
- Kingdom: Plantae
- Clade: Tracheophytes
- Clade: Angiosperms
- Clade: Eudicots
- Clade: Asterids
- Order: Asterales
- Family: Asteraceae
- Tribe: Heliantheae
- Genus: Borrichia
- Species: B. arborescens

Binomial name
- Borrichia arborescens (L.) DC.

Synonyms
- Anthemis crassifolia Sessé & Moc. 1894 not Humb. ex Steud. 1840; Borrichia argentea (Kunth) DC.; Borrichia glabrata Small; Bubonium arborescens (L.) Hill; Buphthalmum arborescens L.; Buphthalmum canum L'Hér. ex DC.; Diomedea argentea Kunth; Diomedea glabrata Kunth; Diomedea indentata Cass.

= Borrichia arborescens =

Species of flowering plant

Borrichia arborescens is a species of flowering plant in the family Asteraceae known by the common name tree seaside tansy. It is native to the Yucatán Peninsula, Cuba, Jamaica, Bahamas, Cayman Islands, Hispaniola, Puerto Rico, Bermuda, the Florida Keys, and other islands in the region. It is found on rocky and sandy coasts, in both beaches and marshes.

Borrichia arborescens produces yellow flower heads in late spring and summer. Despite its common name, it is only a shrub reaching heights of 5 feet (150 cm).

Hybrids with Borrichia frutescens are known where the two species come into contact.
