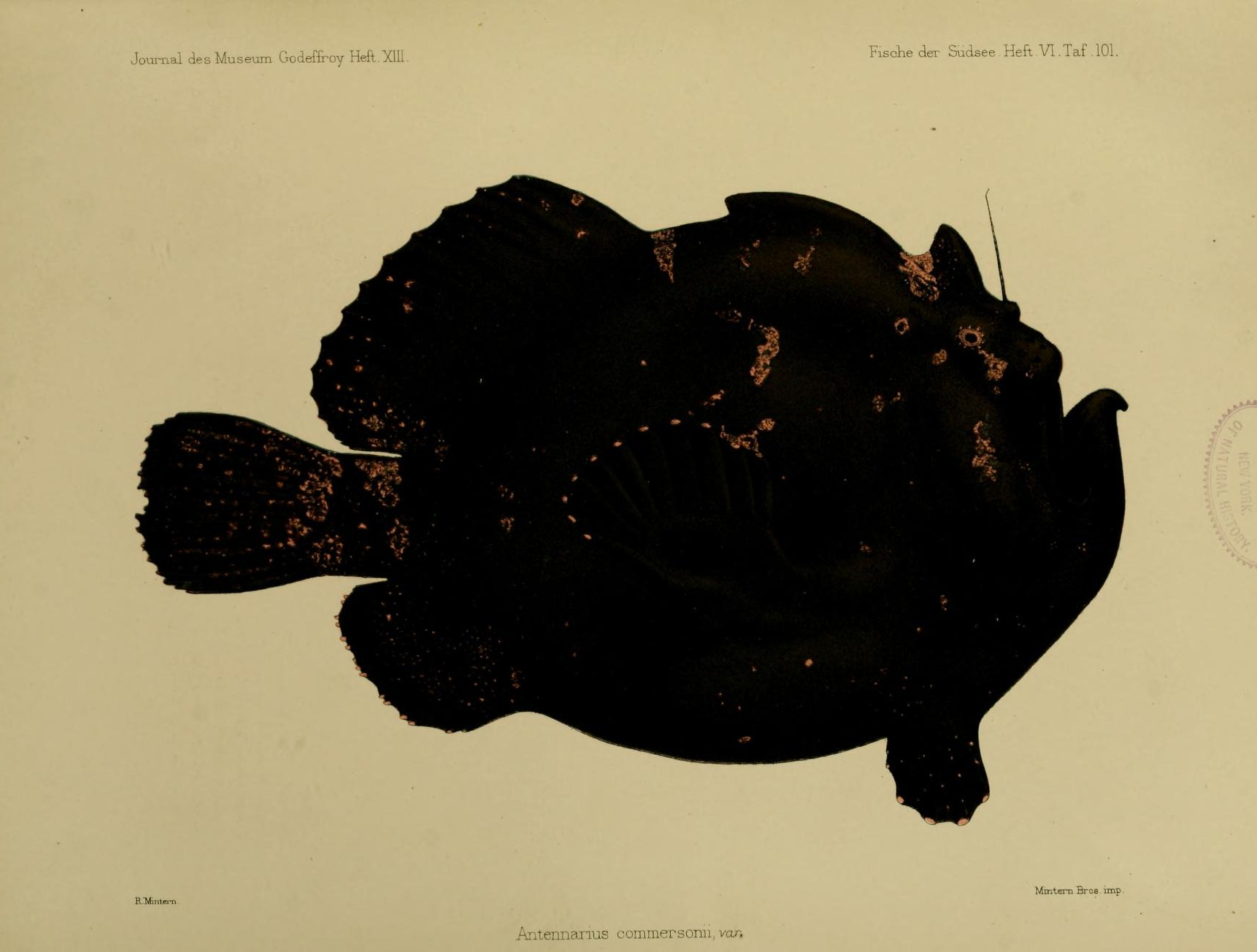

Conservation status
- Least Concern (IUCN 3.1)

Scientific classification
- Kingdom: Animalia
- Phylum: Chordata
- Class: Actinopterygii
- Order: Lophiiformes
- Family: Antennariidae
- Genus: Fowlerichthys
- Species: F. senegalensis

Binomial name
- Fowlerichthys senegalensis (Cadenat, 1959)

Synonyms
- Antennarius senegalensis Cadenat, 1959

= Fowlerichthys senegalensis =

Species of fish

Fowlerichthys senegalensis, the Senegalese frogfish, is a species of marine ray-finned fish belonging to the family Antennariidae, the frogfishes. This fish is found in the eastern Atlantic Ocean off the western coast of Africa.

== Taxonomy ==
Fowlerichthys senegalensis was first formally described as Antennarius senegalensis in 1959 by the French ichthyologist Jean Cadenat with its type locality given as Cap des Biches in Senegal. Within the genus this species is most closely related to the ocellated frogfish (F. ocellatus). The 5th edition of Fishes of the World classifies the genus Fowlerichthys in the family Antennariidae within the suborder Antennarioidei within the order Lophiiformes, the anglerfishes.

== Etymology ==
Fowlerichthys senegalensis has the genus name Fowlerichthys which combines Fowler, honouring the American ichthyologist Henry Weed Fowler of the Academy of Natural Sciences of Philadelphia who gave Barbour the type specimen of the type species of the genus, F. floridanus, with ichthys, which means fish. The specific name, senegalensis, means "of Senegal", the type locality.

== Description ==
Fowlerichthys senegalensis has 3 dorsal spines, a dorsal fin with 14 soft rays and an anal fin with between 6 and 10 soft rays. The body is globular in shape and short with a large mouth with numerous small teeth. The first dorsal spine, the illicium has a small esca and it is almost the same length as the second dorsal spine. The rough skin has a dense covering of bifurcate spines. The pectoral fin lobes are connected to the body, The overall colour is mottle brown in life with a dark, pale margined ocellus below the base of the dorsal fin on each side of the body. This species has a maximum published standard length of 28.5 cm (11.2 in).

== Distribution and habitat ==
Fowlerichthys senegalensis is found in the Eastern Atlantic Ocean off the western coast of Africa between Morocco south as far as Angola, including the Cape Verde Islands and the islands in the Gulf of Guinea. The Senegalese frogfish is found at depths between 45 and 115 m (148 and 377 ft) on rocky reefs and sandy and muddy areas below the low tide mark.
