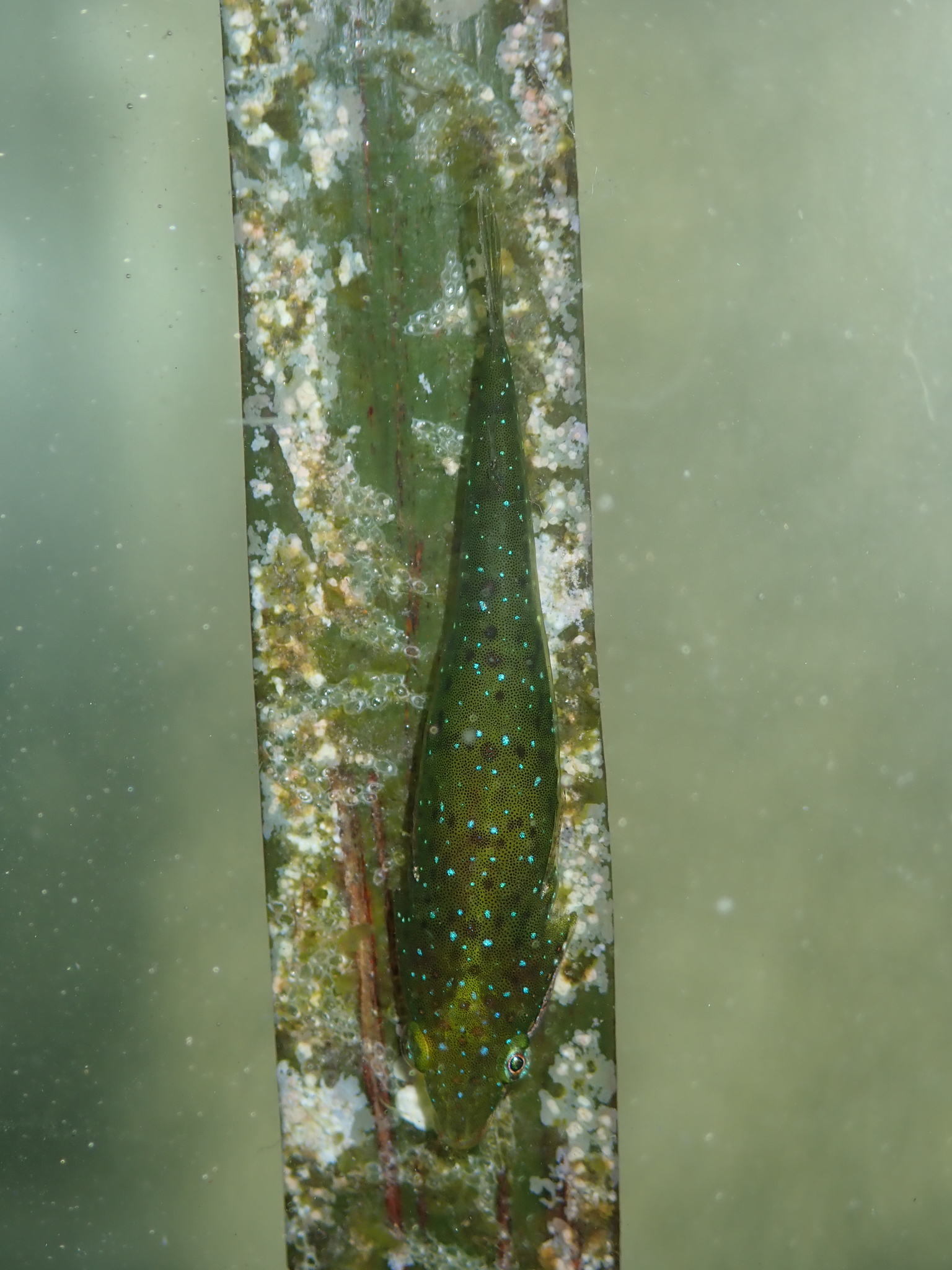

Conservation status
- Least Concern (IUCN 3.1)

Scientific classification
- Kingdom: Animalia
- Phylum: Chordata
- Class: Actinopterygii
- Order: Blenniiformes
- Family: Gobiesocidae
- Genus: Opeatogenys
- Species: O. gracilis

Binomial name
- Opeatogenys gracilis (Canestrini, 1864)

Synonyms
- Mirbelia gracilis Canestrini, 1864

= Opeatogenys gracilis =

Species of fish

Opeatogenys gracilis is a species of clingfish from the family Gobiesocidae which is found in the Mediterranean Sea and in the eastern Atlantic Ocean. Suggested common names for this species are the pygmy clingfish and the seagrass clingfish.

== Description ==
Opeatogenys gracilis has a short snout which is depressed and triangular in shape. Its general shape is rather similar to that of the two-spotted clingfish (Diplecogaster bimaculata). The dorsal and anal fins are relatively small and situated close to the caudal fin. The pectoral fins are modified to form the suction disc, a characteristic of clingfishes. The colour can be greenish or orange with light blue spots and there is a white line along the back. The maximum total length is 3 centimetres (1.2 in).

== Distribution ==
Opeatogenys gracilis occurs only in the northeastern Atlantic Ocean from the coasts of the Algarve eastwards to the Levant. Until specimens were collected off southern Portugal, it had been considered to be endemic to the Mediterranean. Within the Mediterranean, O. gracilis has been recorded off the coast of Malaga, Spain, Algeria, Cyprus, France, Sicily and off Sfax in Tunisia.

== Habitat and biology ==
Opeatogenys gracilis is found on the leaves of seagrasses such as Posidonia oceanica and Cymodocea nodosa and on the fronds of algae, attaching to the leaves or fronds with the sucking disc formed by the modified pectoral fins. It is thought that this small fish only lives for a few years. Adults feed on small invertebrates which also live on the leaves of seagrass. The pelagic larval stage of this species lasts for a mean of 14.6 days. Off Sicily, the preferred prey was found to be copepods of the order Harpacticoida.

== Taxonomy and etymology ==
Opeatogenys gracilis is a clingfish and is placed in the family Gobiesocidae. It was originally described as Mirbelia gracilis by Giovanni Canestrini from a type locality given as the Mediterranean Sea. In 1955, John Carmon Briggs placed it in the monotypic genus Opeatogenys. In 1957, Briggs described a second species of Opeatogenys, O. cadenati, from the coasts of western Africa. The generic name is derived from the Greek opeatos which means an "awl" and genys which means "cheek", while the specific name gracilis means "slender".
