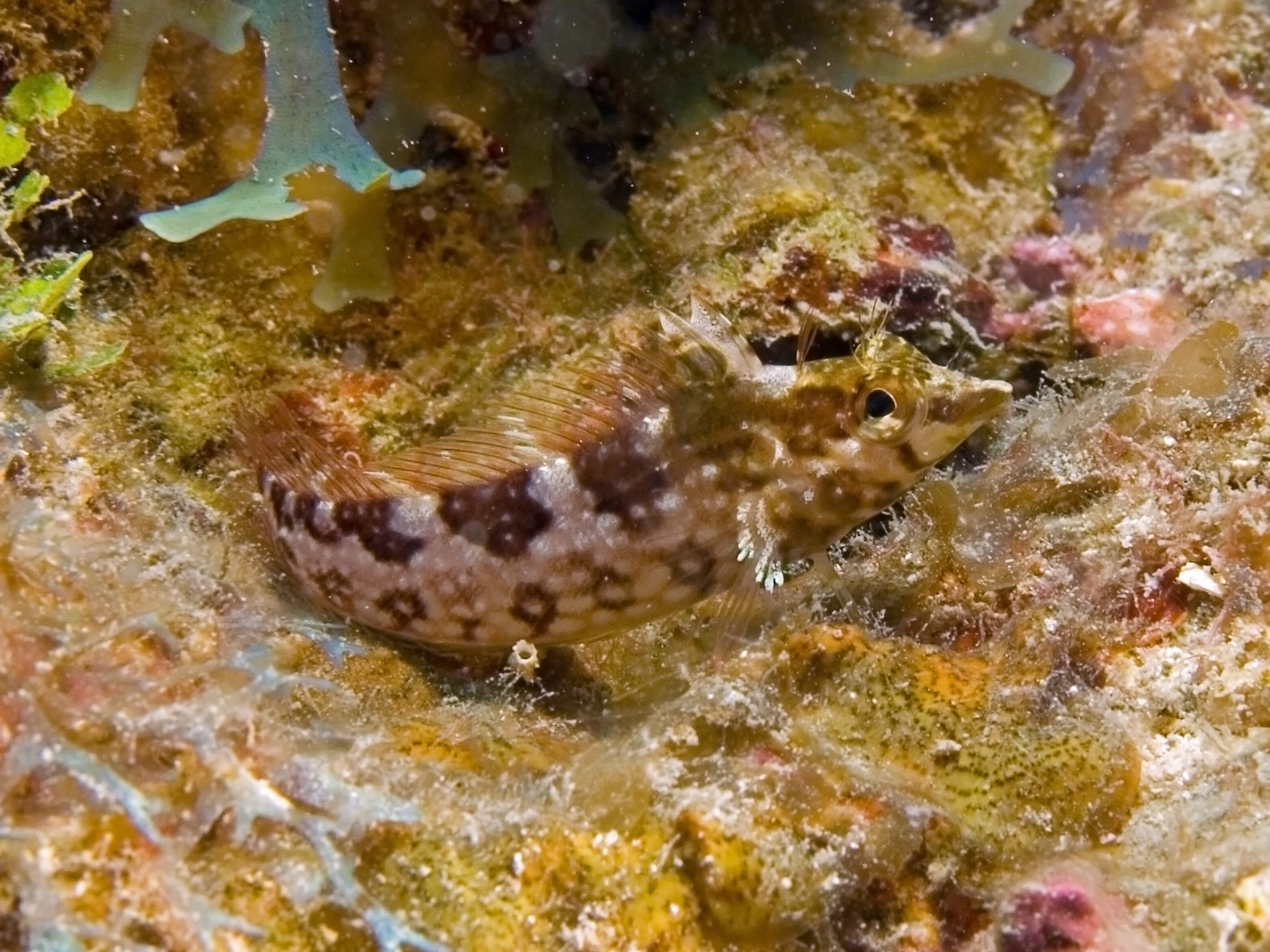
- Malacoctenus boehlkei

Scientific classification
- Kingdom: Animalia
- Phylum: Chordata
- Class: Actinopterygii
- Order: Blenniiformes
- Family: Labrisomidae
- Genus: Malacoctenus; T. N. Gill, 1860

Type species
- Clinus delalandii Valenciennes, 1836

Synonyms
- Acteis Jordan, 1904; Tagusa Herre, 1935

= Malacoctenus =

Genus of fishes

Malacoctenus is a genus of labrisomid blennies native to the eastern Pacific Ocean and the Atlantic Ocean.

== Species ==
There are currently 23 recognized species in this genus:

- Malacoctenus africanus Cadenat, 1951
- Malacoctenus aurolineatus C. L. Smith, 1957 (Goldline blenny)
- Malacoctenus boehlkei V. G. Springer, 1959 (Diamond blenny)
- Malacoctenus brunoi R. Z. P. Guimarães, Nunan (pt) & Gasparini, 2010
- Malacoctenus carrowi Wirtz, 2014
- Malacoctenus costaricanus V. G. Springer, 1959
- Malacoctenus delalandii Valenciennes, 1836
- Malacoctenus ebisui V. G. Springer, 1959 (Fishgod blenny)
- Malacoctenus erdmani C. L. Smith, 1957
- Malacoctenus gigas V. G. Springer, 1959 (Sonora blenny)
- Malacoctenus gilli Steindachner, 1867 (Dusky blenny)
- Malacoctenus hubbsi V. G. Springer, 1959 (Redside blenny)
- Malacoctenus macropus Poey, 1868 (Rosy blenny)
- Malacoctenus margaritae Fowler, 1944 (Margarita blenny)
- Malacoctenus mexicanus V. G. Springer, 1959
- Malacoctenus polyporosus V. G. Springer, 1959
- Malacoctenus sudensis V. G. Springer, 1959
- Malacoctenus tetranemus Cope, 1877 (Throatspotted blenny)
- Malacoctenus triangulatus V. G. Springer, 1959 (Saddled blenny)
- Malacoctenus versicolor Poey, 1876 (Barfin blenny)
- Malacoctenus zacae V. G. Springer, 1959 (Zaca blenny)
- Malacoctenus zonifer D. S. Jordan & C. H. Gilbert, 1882 (Glossy blenny)
- Malacoctenus zonogaster Heller & Snodgrass, 1903 (Belted blenny)
