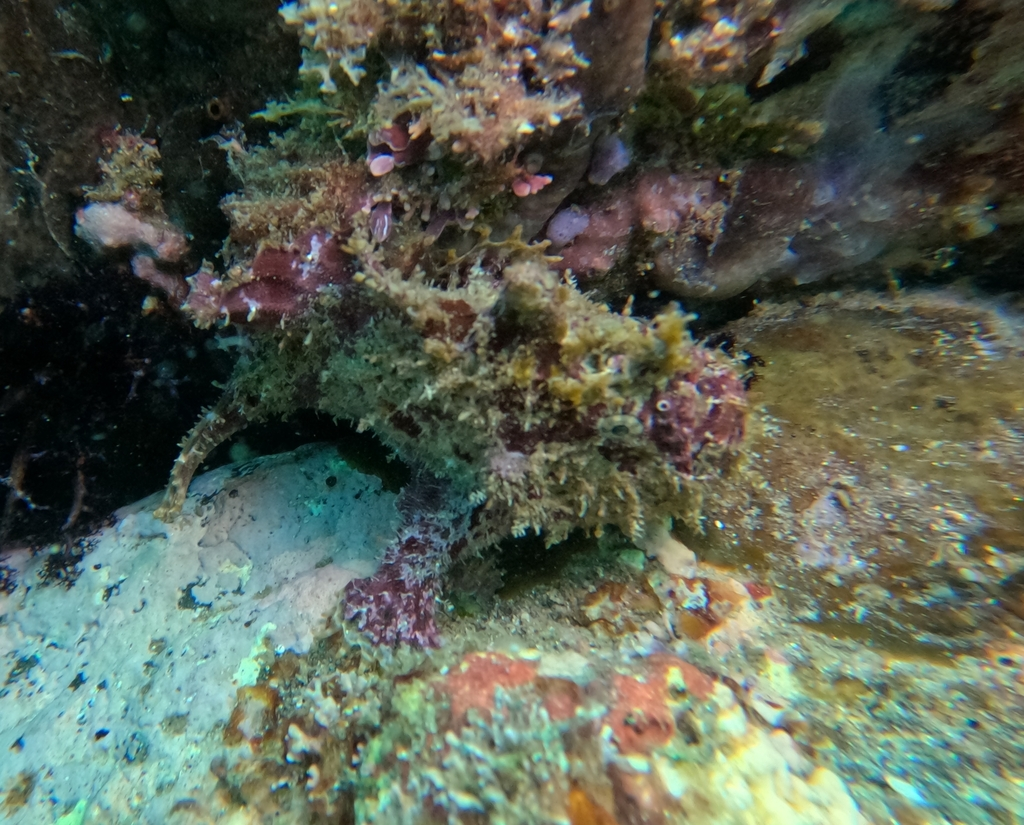

Conservation status
- Least Concern (IUCN 3.1)

Scientific classification
- Kingdom: Animalia
- Phylum: Chordata
- Class: Actinopterygii
- Order: Lophiiformes
- Family: Antennariidae
- Genus: Fowlerichthys
- Species: F. avalonis

Binomial name
- Fowlerichthys avalonis (D. S. Jordan & Starks, 1907)

Synonyms
- Antennarius avalonis D. S. Jordan & Starks, 1907

= Fowlerichthys avalonis =

Species of frogfish

Fowlerichthys avalonis, the roughbar frogfish or roughjaw frogfish, is a species of marine ray-finned fish belonging to the family Antennariidae, the frogfishes. This fish is found in the Eastern Pacific Ocean, where it is the most widespread frogfish species.

== Taxonomy ==
Fowlerichthys avalonis Was first formally described as Antennarius avalonis in 1907 by the American ichthyologists David Starr Jordan and Edwin Chapin Starks with its type locality given as Santa Catalina Island, California. The 5th edition of Fishes of the World classifies the genus Fowlerichthys in the family Antennariidae within the suborder Antennarioidei within the order Lophiiformes, the anglerfishes.

== Etymology ==
Fowlerichthys avalonis has the genus name Fowlerichthys which combines Fowler, honouring the American ichthyologist Henry Weed Fowler of the Academy of Natural Sciences of Philadelphia who gave Barbour the type specimen of the type species of the genus, F. floridanus, with ichthys, which means fish. The specific name, avalonis, refers to the type locality of Avalon Bay on Santa Catalina Island.

== Description ==
Fowlerichthys avalonis has a rather globular body which has some lateral compression with a large upwardly pointing mouth with many small bristle-like teeth. The illicium is roughly equal in length to the second dorsal spine, with an esca, or lure, that is around 40% of the length of the illicium and is an oval bunch of short, vertical appendages. The second dorsal spine is joined to the head by a membrane while the third dorsal spine is unconnected and moveable. The eyes are located on the side of the head and the small gill openings are located to the rear and below the base of the pectoral fin. There is a caudal peduncle but the rear of the dorsal and anal fins are not connected to the caudal fin. The pectoral fins are limb like and have a joint resembling an elbow and have a wide connection to the body. The skin on the body has a dense covering of bifurcated spicules. The color varies and may yellow, orange, red, brown or black with distinct light and dark mottles, There are large black ocelli with thin orange margins on the base of the rear of the dorsal fin. The dorsal fin has between 12 and 14 soft rays while the anal fin has 8 or 9 soft rays. This species has a maximum published total length of 33 cm (13 in).

== Distribution and habitat ==
Fowlerichthys avalonis is the most widely distributed frogfish in the eastern Pacific Ocean and is distributed from California in the north to northern Chile in the south. The roughbar frogfish is found at depths between 0 and 300 m (0 and 984 ft), although they are typically found between 0 and 95 m (0 and 312 ft). They are associated with rocky areas, even within the intertidal zone, as well as areas of sand and mud substrates.

== Biology ==
Fowlerichthys avalonis is an ambush predator, sitting motionless on the reef, camouflaged, waiting for small fish to come within striking distance. They are also known to stalk prey such as fish and crustaceans. Spawning involves the laying of pelagic eggs, the females laying as many as 300,000 eggs within a buoyant raft, this floats in the sea for several days until the eggs hatch. Crustaceans dominate the diet of younger fishes while adults prey mainly in fish.
