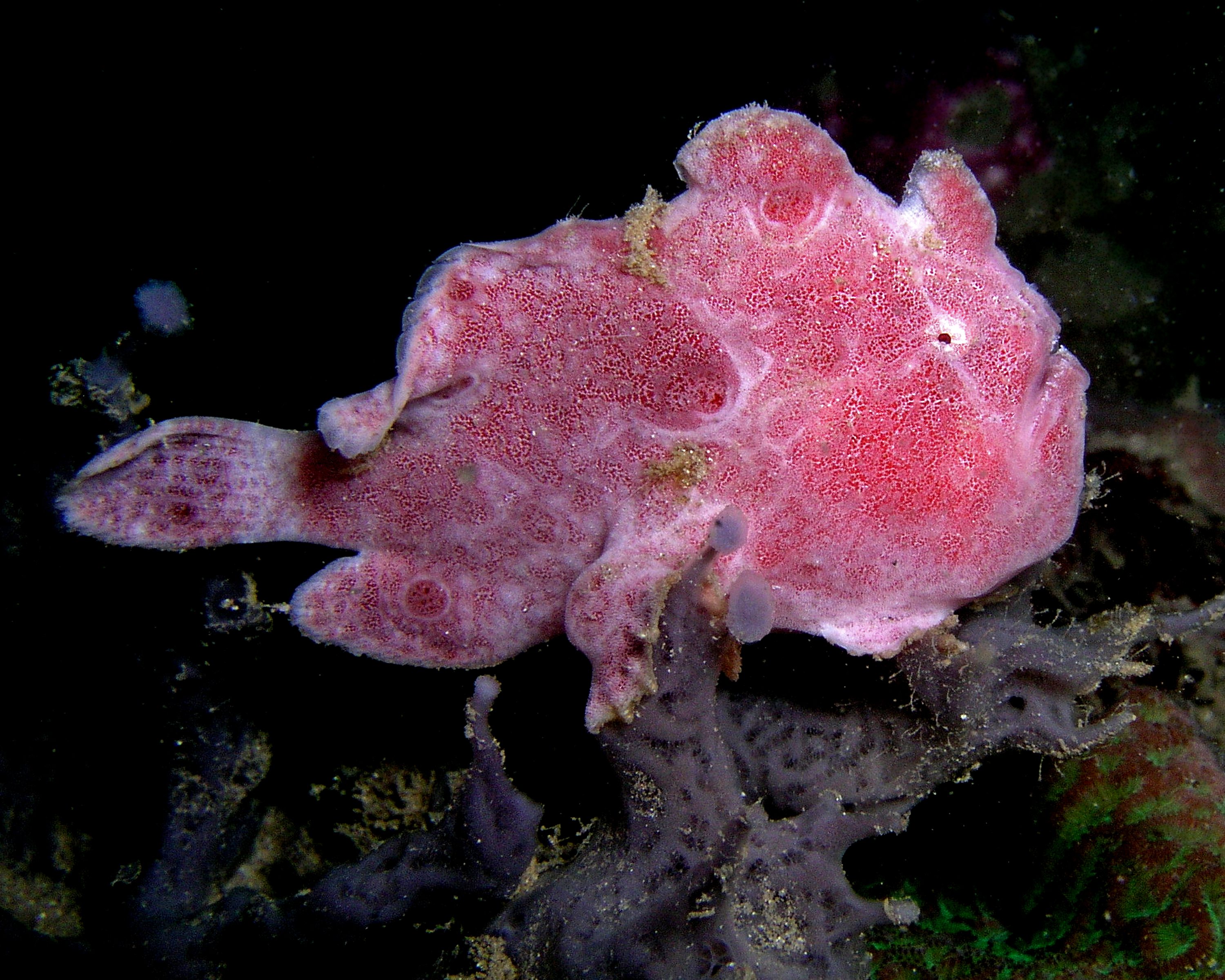
- Ocellated frogfish (F. ocellatus)

Scientific classification
- Kingdom: Animalia
- Phylum: Chordata
- Class: Actinopterygii
- Order: Lophiiformes
- Family: Antennariidae
- Subfamily: Fowlerichthyinae; Maile, Smith & Davis, 2025
- Genus: Fowlerichthys; T. Barbour, 1941

Type species
- Fowlerichthys floridanus T. Barbour, 1941

Species
- 5, See below.

Synonyms
- Kanazawaichthys Schultz, 1957

= Fowlerichthys =

Fowlerichthys Temporal range: Early Eocene to present

Genus of fishes

Fowlerichthys is a genus of marine ray-finned fishes belonging to the family Antennariidae, the frogfishes. The fishes in this genus are found in the Atlantic, Indian and Pacific Oceans. It is the only member of the subfamily Fowlerichthyinae.

== Taxonomy ==
Fowlerichthys was first proposed as a monospecific genus in 1941 by the American zoologist Thomas Barbour when he described Fowlerichthys floridanus, which he also designated as its type species. F. floridanus is now considered a junior synonym of Antennarius radiosus, described in 1896 by Samuel Garman, with a type locality of Key West in Florida.

Some authorities classify this genus as belonging to the subfamily Antennariinae within the Antennariidae family. However, the 5th edition of Fishes of the World does not recognise subfamilies within the Antennariidae, classifying the family within the suborder Antennarioidei within the order Lophiiformes, the anglerfishes. In a 2025 phylogenetic study, it was found to form a distinct lineage from the other frogfishes, and was thus classified into its own subfamily Fowlerichthyinae, which was recognized by Eschmeyer's Catalog of Fishes. Fowlerichthyinae is thought to be the sister group to all other lineages within Antennariidae.

A fossil relative, †Neilpeartia Carnevale et al., 2020 (named after Neil Peart), is known from the Early Eocene-aged Monte Bolca site of Italy, which is thought to be the sister genus to the extant Fowlerichthys. The fossil species F. monodi is known from the Late Miocene of Algeria.

== Etymology ==
Fowlerichthys combines Fowler, honouring the American ichthyologist Henry Weed Fowler of the Academy of Natural Sciences of Philadelphia, who gave Barbour the type specimen of F. floridanus, with ichthys, which means fish.

== Species ==
There are currently five recognized species in this genus:

- Fowlerichthys avalonis (D. S. Jordan & Starks, 1907) (Roughbar frogfish)
- Fowlerichthys ocellatus (Bloch & J. G. Schneider, 1801) (Ocellated frogfish)
- Fowlerichthys radiosus (Garman, 1896) (Singlespot frogfish)
- Fowlerichthys scriptissimus (D. S. Jordan, 1902) (Calico frogfish)
- Fowlerichthys senegalensis (Cadenat, 1959) (Senegalese frogfish)

The fossil species †Fowlerichthys monodi (Carnevale & Pietsch, 2006) is known from the latest Miocene (Messinian) of Algeria. Previously, this species was described in the genus Antennarius on the basis of its apparent relation to the Senegalese frogfish, but was reclassified into Fowlerichthys following the reclassification of the latter species.

== Characteristics ==
Fowlerichthys frogfishes have globose rather compressed bodies covered in densely set bifurcated spinules, with their eyes placed on the sides of the head. The upwardly pointing mouth has numerous small teeth. The illicium does not have a distinct esca, or lur, and any spinules on the illicium are located at its base or along its front edge. The illicium is slightly shorter than the second dorsal spine present. The rear margins of the dorsal and anal fin membranes have a membrane connecting them to the body on front of the caudal peduncle. The dorsal fin has between 12 and 14 soft rays, all typically having a single fork, with the anal fin having between 7 and 10 similar rays. These are large frogfishes, with the largest species being the ocellated frogfish (F. ocellatus), which has a maximum published total length of 38 cm (15 in). In comparison, the smallest is the single-spot frogfish (Fowlerichthys radiosus), which has a maximum length of 25 cm (9.8 in).

== Distribution and habitat ==
Fowlerichthys frogfishes are found in the warmer waters of the Atlantic, Indian and Pacific Oceans, with two species, F. ocellatus and F. radiosus, in the Western Atlantic Ocean, one, F. senegalensis, in the Eastern Atlantic Ocean, one F. scriptissimus, in the Indo-West Pacific and one in the Eastern Pacific, F. avalonis. These fish are typically found in rocky and reef habitats, frequently in the intertidal zone, sometimes on sandy and muddy bottoms and one species, F. radiosus, on offshore banks and the deeper waters of the continental shelf.
