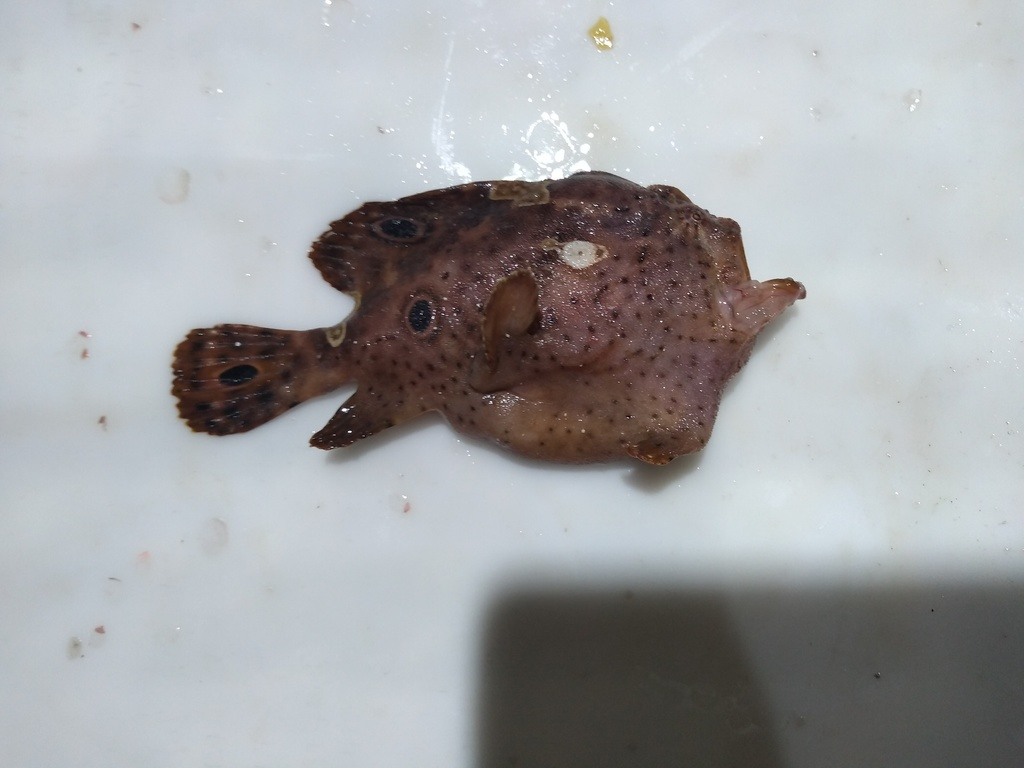

Conservation status
- Least Concern (IUCN 3.1)

Scientific classification
- Kingdom: Animalia
- Phylum: Chordata
- Class: Actinopterygii
- Order: Lophiiformes
- Family: Antennariidae
- Genus: Fowlerichthys
- Species: F. ocellatus

Binomial name
- Fowlerichthys ocellatus (Bloch & J. G. Schneider, 1801)

Synonyms
- Lophius histrio ocellatus Bloch & Schneider, 1801; Antennarius ocellatus (Bloch & Schneider, 1801)

= Ocellated frogfish =

Species of fish

The ocellated frogfish (Fowlerichthys ocellatus) is a species of marine ray-finned fish belonging to the family Antennariidae, the frogfishes. This fish is found in the Western Atlantic Ocean.

== Taxonomy ==
The ocellated frogfish was first formally described as Lophius histrio ocellatus by the German naturalists Marcus Elieser Bloch and Johann Gottlob Theaenus Schneider with its type locality given as Havana. This species is most closely related to F. senegalensis. The 5th edition of Fishes of the World classifies the genus Fowlerichthys in the family Antennariidae within the suborder Antennarioidei within the order Lophiiformes, the anglerfishes.

== Etymology ==
The ocellated frogfish has the genus name Fowlerichthys which combines Fowler, honouring the American ichthyologist Henry Weed Fowler of the Academy of Natural Sciences of Philadelphia who gave Barbour the type specimen of the type species of the genus, F. floridanus, with ichthys, which means fish. The specific name, ocellatus, means having ocelli, a reference to the 2 or 3 eye-like spots possessed by this species.

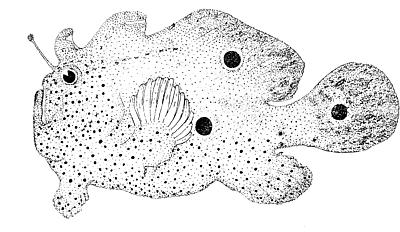

== Description ==
The ocellated frogfish has a somewhat compressed, globose body with the eyes placed on the sides of the head and a large upwardly pointing mouth with many small teeth. The small gill openings are located to the rear and below the base of the pectoral fin, which is limb-like with and elbow like joint and broad connection to the body. There are 3 dorsal spines and a dorsal fin which contains 13 soft rays. The first dorsal spine, the illicium is roughly equal in length to the second dorsal spine and is topped with an esca which is a cluster of elongated filaments. The second dorsal spine is curved and connected to the skin on the head by a membrane. The third dorsal spine is moveable and is not connected to the skin on the head. The anal fin contains 8 soft rays, there is a caudal peduncle and the rear edges of the dorsal and anal fins are not connected to the caudal fin. The skin on the body has a dense covering of bifurcated spicules. The color of this fish is variable and ranges from orange to mottled yellow-brown, there are typically three large conspicuous ocelli, 1 located on the lower middle part of the dorsal fin, 1 directly under the spot on the dorsal fin and another in the middle of the caudal fin. There are also many small dark spots on the lower head and body. This species has a maximum published total length of 38 cm (15 in), making it the largest frogfish in the Western Atlantic.

== Distribution and habitat ==
The ocellate frogfish is found in the Western Atlantic Ocean where it is found as far north as North Carolina, south through the Gulf of Mexico and the Caribbean to the northern coast of South America in Colombia and Venezuela. This species is found on rock and coral reefs at depths between 1 and 150 m (3 ft 3 in and 492 ft 2 in), although typically between 20 and 50 m (66 and 164 ft).

== Biology ==
Ocellated frogfish are piscivorous predators which are sedentary when not hunting. The female's ovaries resemble tightly wound double scrolls and when they lay eggs these are encased in a gelatinous mass which floats.
