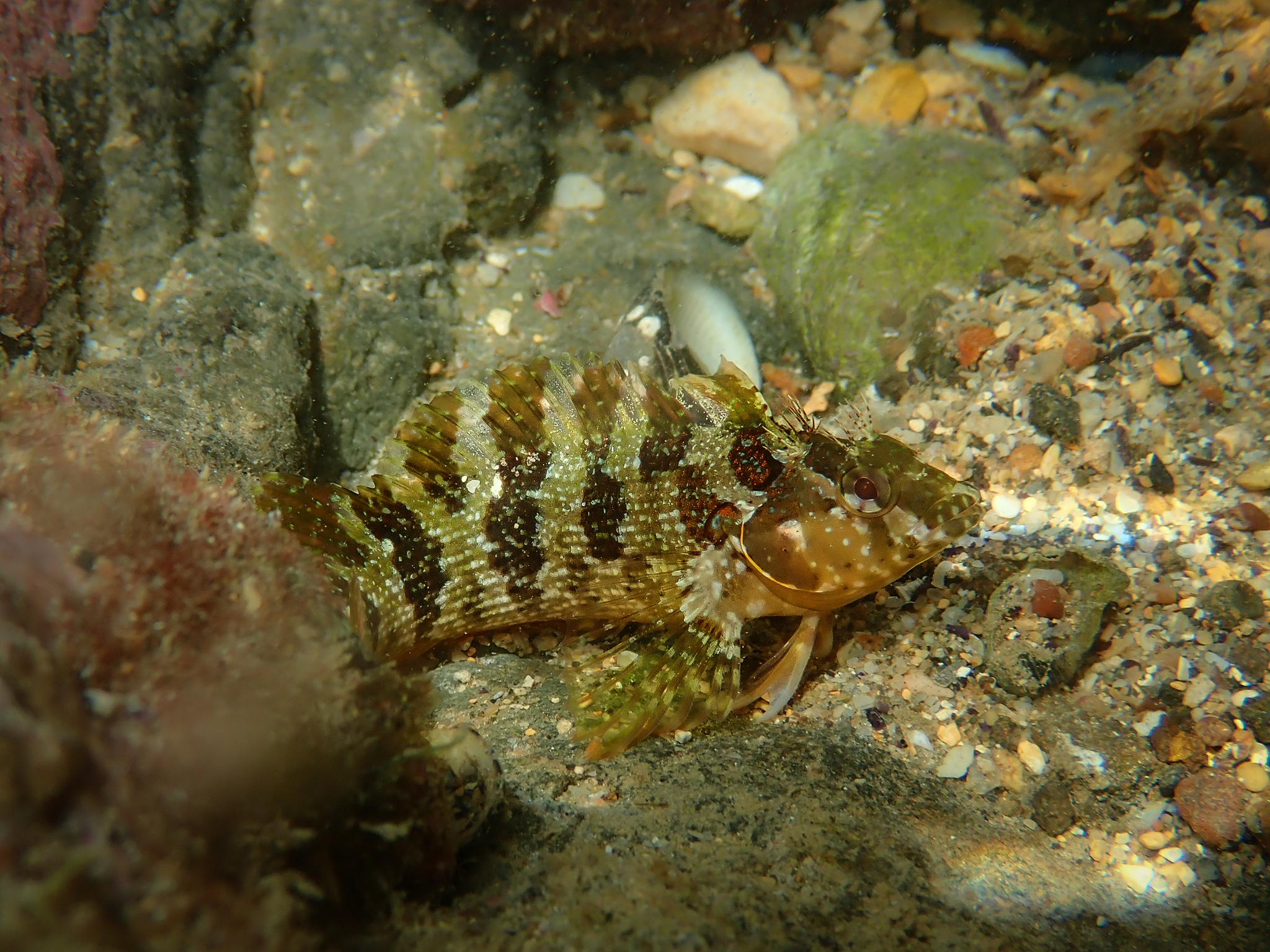

Conservation status
- Data Deficient (IUCN 3.1)

Scientific classification
- Kingdom: Animalia
- Phylum: Chordata
- Class: Actinopterygii
- Order: Blenniiformes
- Family: Labrisomidae
- Genus: Malacoctenus
- Species: M. africanus

Binomial name
- Malacoctenus africanus Cadenat, 1951

= Malacoctenus africanus =

Species of fish

Malacoctenus africanus is a species of labrisomid blenny endemic to the waters around the islands of Goree and N'Gor off the coast of Senegal. This species prefers areas with rocky substrates in shallow waters. It can reach a length of 7.3 centimetres (2.9 in) TL.
