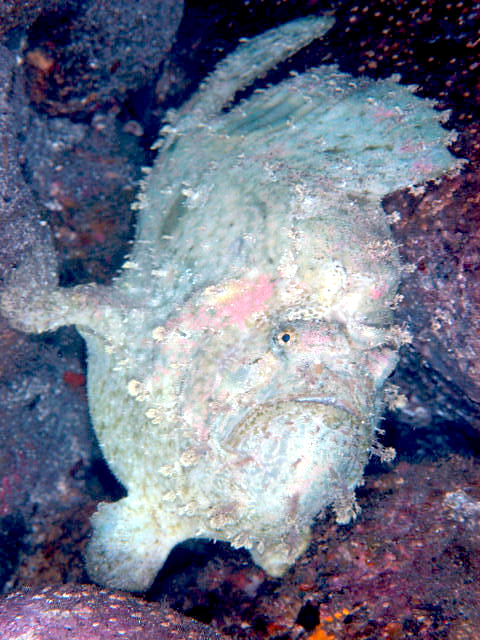

Scientific classification
- Kingdom: Animalia
- Phylum: Chordata
- Class: Actinopterygii
- Order: Lophiiformes
- Family: Antennariidae
- Genus: Fowlerichthys
- Species: F. scriptissimus

Binomial name
- Fowlerichthys scriptissimus (D. S. Jordan, 1902)

Synonyms
- Antennarius scriptissimus D. S. Jordan, 1902; Antennarius sarasa Tanaka, 1916; Fowlerichthys sarasa (Tanaka, 1916)

= Fowlerichthys scriptissimus =

Species of frogfish

Fowlerichthys scriptissimus, the calico frogfish or scripted frogfish, is a species of fish in the family Antennariidae. It is native to the Indo-West Pacific, where it occurs in rocky areas of coastal coral reefs at a depth range of 73 to 185 m (240 to 607 ft). It is an oviparous species that reaches and reportedly may exceed 28 cm (11 in) SL. On March 28, 2012, an individual measuring 29.1 cm (11.5 in) SL was collected off the coast of Jejudo, marking the first record of this species from Korean waters.

== Taxonomy ==
Fowlerichthys scriptissmus was first formally described as Antennarius scriptissimus in 1907 by the American ichthyologist David Starr Jordan with its type locality given as the Bōsō Peninsula in Chiba Prefecture in Japan. The 5th edition of Fishes of the World classifies the genus Fowlerichthys in the family Antennariidae within the suborder Antennarioidei within the order Lophiiformes, the anglerfishes.

== Etymology ==
Fowlerichthys scriptissimus has the genus name Fowlerichthys which combines Fowler, honouring the American ichthyologist Henry Weed Fowler of the Academy of Natural Sciences of Philadelphia who gave Barbour the type specimen of the type species of the genus, F. floridanus, with ichthys, which means fish. The specific name, scriptissimus, means "written all over", a reference to the markings of this fish which Jordan described as "everywhere covered with narrow straightish, parallel, dark brown lines running in different directions on different parts of the body".
