= Merluccius senegalensis =

Conservation status
- Endangered (IUCN 3.1)

Scientific classification
- Kingdom: Animalia
- Phylum: Chordata
- Class: Actinopterygii
- Order: Gadiformes
- Family: Merlucciidae
- Genus: Merluccius
- Species: M. senegalensis

Binomial name
- Merluccius senegalensis Cadenat, 1950

Species of fish

Merluccius senegalensis, the Senegalese hake, is a species of fish from the family Merlucciidae, the true hakes. It is found in the sub tropical waters of the eastern Atlantic Ocean off the north western coast of Africa.

== Description ==
Merluccius senegalensis is a rather long-headed species in which the head is 24.9% to 27.7% of the fish's standard length. The total number of gill rakers is 13-18 on the on first arch. The anterior dorsal fin has a single spine and 9 to 10 fin rays and the posterior dorsal fin has 38-41 fin rays> The anal fin has 37-40 fin rays and the tips of pectoral fins normally extend to the origin of anal fin. The margin of the caudal fin is normally truncated, but as the fish grows it becomes progressively emarginate. It has small scales, with 124-155 scales along the lateral line. They are steel grey to blackish dorsally with the lateral and ventral surfaces being silvery white. The inside of the mouth and tongue are blackish and there is a split black mark on the submandibular fold. The maximum length is 81 cm but the more common length is around 42 cm, males are smaller than females.

== Distribution ==
Merluccius senegalensis is found along the Atlantic coast of western North Africa, from Cape Cantin at 33°N to Cape Roxo at 10°N. It is partially sympatric with the European hake (M. merluccius) in the northern part of its range and with of M. polli in the southern part. It distribution changes through the year with a southerly movement in October to April and a return northwards in August.

== Habitat and biology ==
Merluccius senegalensis is a bathypelagic and demersal species which prefers to live the over sandy or muddy substrates at relatively shallow depths between about 18m and 500 m. The spawning period most likely takes place from January to March at depths of around 300m and at temperatures of about 12 °C. The main prey is fish such as Synagrops microlepis, the Shortnose greeneye (Chlorophthalmus agassizi), the Cunene horse mackerel (Trachurus trecae), mackerel, whiptails, lanternfish and merlucids; as well as crustaceans including Munida iris, Parapenaeus longirostris, Plesionika edwardsii and Plesionika heterocarpus; and cephalopods. Females attain sexual maturity at about 39 cm while males reach sexual maturity between 22 cm and 28 cm.

== Fisheries ==
It was formerly targeted by fishing vessels from Spain, Portugal and the Soviet Union but since Morocco and Mauritania declared economic exclusion zones, fishing has been restricted to local fleets. This species tends not to be reported separately and mixed catches of this species with the European hake (Merluccius merluccius) and M. polli. It is also taken as by catch in fisheries for cephalopods and other species. The IUCN currently list M. senegalensis as Endangered as it is thought that its population probably declined by between 50-80% in the three generations up to 2015.
