= Malacoctenus gigas =

Conservation status
- Least Concern (IUCN 3.1)

Scientific classification
- Kingdom: Animalia
- Phylum: Chordata
- Class: Actinopterygii
- Order: Blenniiformes
- Family: Labrisomidae
- Genus: Malacoctenus
- Species: M. gigas

Binomial name
- Malacoctenus gigas V. G. Springer, 1959

Species of fish

Malacoctenus gigas, the Sonora blenny, is a species of labrisomid blenny endemic to the Gulf of California. It is a shallow water species inhabiting patches of seaweed on reefs. This species can reach a length of 13 centimetres (5.1 in) TL.
