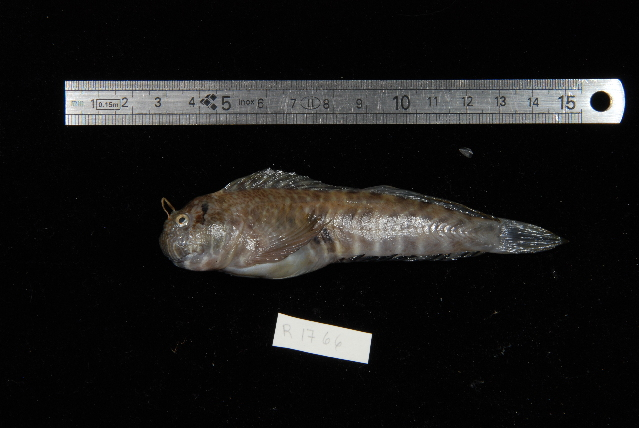

Conservation status
- Least Concern (IUCN 3.1)

Scientific classification
- Kingdom: Animalia
- Phylum: Chordata
- Class: Actinopterygii
- Division: Teleostei
- Order: Blenniiformes
- Family: Blenniidae
- Genus: Entomacrodus
- Species: E. epalzeocheilos

Binomial name
- Entomacrodus epalzeocheilos (Bleeker, 1859)

Synonyms
- Salarias epalzeocheilos Bleeker, 1859; Entomacrodus epalzeocheilus (Bleeker, 1859)

= Entomacrodus epalzeocheilos =

Species of ray-finned fish

Entomacrodus epalzeocheilos, commonly known as the fringelip rockskipper, is a species of combtooth blenny found in very shallow waters of the Indian and Pacific Oceans.
