= Malacoctenus costaricanus =

Conservation status
- Data Deficient (IUCN 3.1)

Scientific classification
- Kingdom: Animalia
- Phylum: Chordata
- Class: Actinopterygii
- Order: Blenniiformes
- Family: Labrisomidae
- Genus: Malacoctenus
- Species: M. costaricanus

Binomial name
- Malacoctenus costaricanus V. G. Springer, 1959

Species of fish

Malacoctenus costaricanus is a species of labrisomid blenny only known from the Pacific coast of Costa Rica and El Salvador.
