= Thinlip splitfin =

Conservation status
- Least Concern (IUCN 3.1)

Scientific classification
- Kingdom: Animalia
- Phylum: Chordata
- Class: Actinopterygii
- Order: Acropomatiformes
- Family: Synagropidae
- Genus: Kaperangus; Schwarzhans & Prokofiev, 2017
- Species: K. microlepis

Binomial name
- Kaperangus microlepis (Norman, 1935)

Synonyms
- Synagrops microlepis Norman, 1935

Species of ray-finned fish

The thinlip splitfin (Kaperangus microlepis) is a species of ray-finned fish in the family Synagropidae. It lives around Africa's Atlantic coast at a depth of 50–500 m (160–1,640 ft) and can grow up to 16.5 cm (6.5 in) long.

== Distribution ==
The thinlip splitfin can be found in the Eastern Atlantic from Mauritania to Namibia, including the Cape Verde Islands.

== Description ==
The thinlip splitfin is dark brownish above and paler below. It has 10 dorsal spines, 9 dorsal soft rays, 2 anal spines, and 9 anal soft rays. It attains a maximum size of 18 centimetres (7.1 in) total length, reaching sexual maturity at a total length of 10 centimetres (3.9 in).

== Habitat and biology ==
The thinlip splitfin is a bathypelagic fish which occurs near muddy bottoms at depths of 70–1,000 metres (230–3,280 ft). It is a predator of crustaceans such as euphasiids, mysids and decapods as well as fish and cephalopods. The species from the family Acropomatidae form loose aggregations normally near the bottom and some of them undertake a nocturnal migration towards the surface of the sea. The highest biomass density was recorded during a survey using a bottom trawl over the upper continental slope off of Angola. It is known to be an important component of the diet of the hake Merluccius senegalensis in the waters off of Dakar.

== Taxonomy ==
Kaperangus microlepis was originally formally described in 1935 as Synagrops microlepis by the British ichthyologist John Roxborough Norman (1898-1944) with the type locality given as "Off St. Paul de Loanda, Angola". In 2017 it was placed in the monotypic genus Kaperangus.
