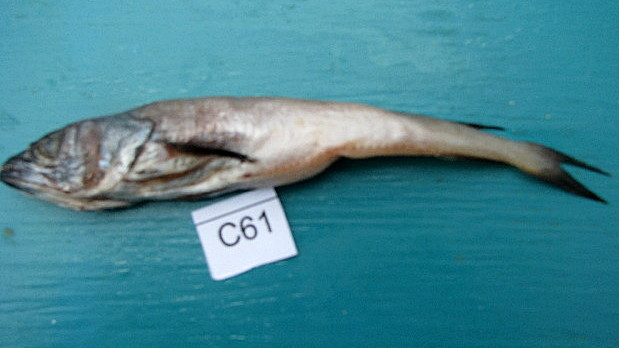

Conservation status
- Least Concern (IUCN 3.1)

Scientific classification
- Kingdom: Animalia
- Phylum: Chordata
- Class: Actinopterygii
- Order: Gadiformes
- Family: Merlucciidae
- Genus: Merluccius
- Species: M. polli

Binomial name
- Merluccius polli Cadenat, 1950

Synonyms
- Merluccius cadenati Doutre, 1960

= Merluccius polli =

Species of fish

Merluccius polli, the Benguela hake, is a species of fish from the family Merlucciidae, the true hakes. It is found in the tropical waters of the eastern Atlantic Ocean off the west coast of Africa.

== Description ==
Merluccius polli has a large head which has a small depression in the cranium, the head is equivalent to just over a quarter of the fish's standard length. The lower jaw and premaxillary have small teeth, the lower jaw is slightly projecting. It has short, thick gill rakers which have blunt tips; and number 8–12 on the first arch. The anterior dorsal fin has a single spine and 8-11 fin rays and the posterior dorsal fin has 37-41 rays. The anal fin has 36–42 fin rays and the pectoral fin tips normally extend as far as the origin of the anal fin, except in large individuals. The caudal fin has a truncated marginal though this can occasionally be emarginate. The scales are loose and easily shed, there are 102 to 127 along the lateral line. It is usually blackish in colour on the back paling to steel grey to blackish on belly and the caudal fin has a white edge. This species differs from the Panama hake in that in juveniles the caudal fin has a central lobe and is truncate in adults, whereas the caudal fin is emarginate in the Panama hake, its pectoral fin projects well beyond the anus in but does not do so in the Panama hake. The inside of the mouth and the tongue are usually blackish and there is a black marking on the submandibular fold. They grow to a maximum length of 80 cm, although fish of 16–42 cm are commonest.

== Distribution ==
Merluccius polli occurs in the eastern Atlantic off the west coast of Africa from Cape Barbas (22°N) in Western Sahara south to Cape Fria in Namibia (18°S). It is also found off the Canary Islands, although it has not been recorded from the Cape Verde Islands

== Habitat and biology ==
Merluccius polli is a bathydemersal species that, in the northern part of its range, occurs on the continental shelf and upper continental slope. Females reach sexual maturity when they reach a length of around 44 cm and spawning occurs in the autumn. The most successful recruitment happens between temperatures of 8–11 °C. It feeds mainly on small fish but its diet also includes squid and free swimming crustaceans. It occurs at depths between 50-910m, although it normally remains between 50 and 550 m. The mean size of individual fish increases with increasing depths.

== Subspecies ==
Two subspecies have been proposed for M. polli:

- Merluccius polli polli from Port Gentil, Angola, to northern Namibia
- Merluccius polli cadenati from Mauritania to Liberia.

These are parapatric and are separated by a 500 km gap in the Gulf of Guinea.

== Fisheries ==
Merluccius polli lives in deep water, is of relatively small in size and is of low abundance so it has been considered to be of low economic potential. The catch statistics of this species are lumped with those of Merluccius senegalensis over the northern part of its range and with M. capensis in Namibia. In the Canaries 65 tonnes were landed in 2010 but in most years almost none are landed.

== Etymology ==
The specific name polli honours the Belgian ichthyologist Max Poll (1908–1991) while the name of the subspecies cadenati honours the French ichthyologist Jean Cadenat (1908–1992), who originally described the species.
