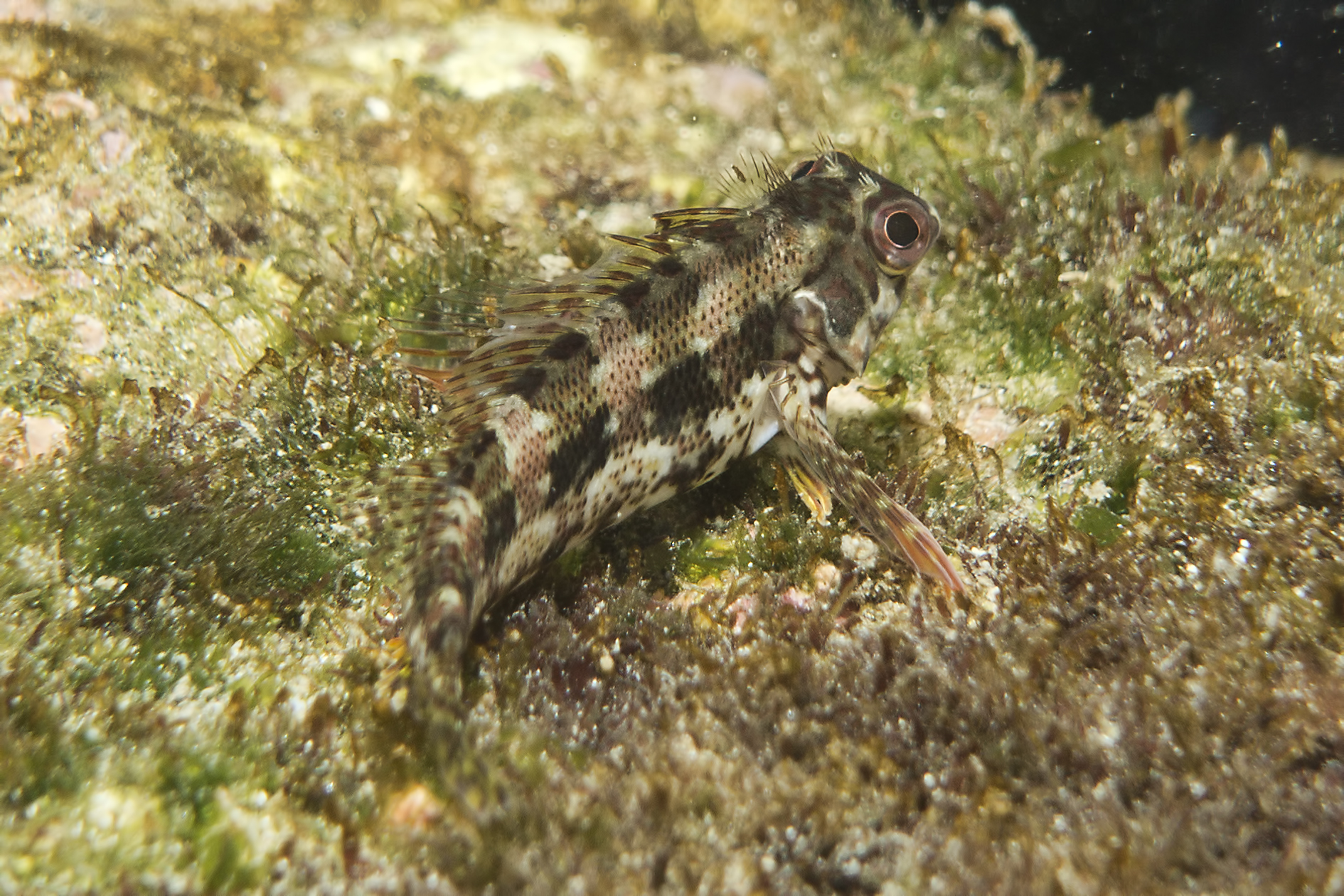

Conservation status
- Least Concern (IUCN 3.1)

Scientific classification
- Kingdom: Animalia
- Phylum: Chordata
- Class: Actinopterygii
- Order: Blenniiformes
- Family: Labrisomidae
- Genus: Malacoctenus
- Species: M. tetranemus

Binomial name
- Malacoctenus tetranemus (Cope, 1877)

Synonyms
- Blennius tetranemus Cope, 1877; Labrisomus afuerae Hildebrand, 1946; Malacoctenus afuerae (Hildebrand, 1946)

= Malacoctenus tetranemus =

Species of fish

Malacoctenus tetranemus, the throatspotted blenny or chameleon clinid, is a species of labrisomid blenny native to the Pacific coast of the Americas from the Gulf of California to Peru as well as around the Galapagos Islands. It inhabits rocky areas where it lives in tide pools and shallows generally at depths of from 6 to 23 metres (20 to 75 ft). This species can reach a length of 7.5 centimetres (3.0 in) TL.
