= Entomacrodus vermiculatus =

Conservation status
- Least Concern (IUCN 3.1)

Scientific classification
- Kingdom: Animalia
- Phylum: Chordata
- Class: Actinopterygii
- Order: Blenniiformes
- Family: Blenniidae
- Genus: Entomacrodus
- Species: E. vermiculatus

Binomial name
- Entomacrodus vermiculatus (Valenciennes, 1836)

Species of fish

Entomacrodus vermiculatus, the vermiculated blenny, is a species of combtooth blenny native to the Indian Ocean where it is found around the Seychelles, the Maldives and Christmas Island. It is largely an inhabitant of the intertidal zone where it is regularly exposed to the air which it is capable of breathing. This species reaches a length of 18 centimetres (7.1 in) TL.
