= Malacoctenus zonifer =

Conservation status
- Least Concern (IUCN 3.1)

Scientific classification
- Kingdom: Animalia
- Phylum: Chordata
- Class: Actinopterygii
- Order: Blenniiformes
- Family: Labrisomidae
- Genus: Malacoctenus
- Species: M. zonifer

Binomial name
- Malacoctenus zonifer (D. S. Jordan & C. H. Gilbert, 1882)

Synonyms
- Clinus zonifer D. S. Jordan & C. H. Gilbert, 1882

Species of fish

Malacoctenus zonifer, the glossy blenny, is a species of labrisomid blenny native to the Pacific coast of Mexico from the south of the Gulf of California to Oaxaca. This species can reach a length of 8 centimetres (3.1 in) TL.
