= Malacoctenus aurolineatus =

Conservation status
- Least Concern (IUCN 3.1)

Scientific classification
- Kingdom: Animalia
- Phylum: Chordata
- Class: Actinopterygii
- Order: Blenniiformes
- Family: Labrisomidae
- Genus: Malacoctenus
- Species: M. aurolineatus

Binomial name
- Malacoctenus aurolineatus C. L. Smith, 1957

Species of fish

Malacoctenus aurolineatus, the Goldline blenny, is a species of labrisomid blenny native to the western Atlantic Ocean, including the Gulf of Mexico and the Caribbean Sea from southern Florida to northern South America. It inhabits rock and coral reefs at depths of from very shallow waters to about 5 metres (16 ft). It prefers living in the vicinity of sea urchins. This species can reach a length of 6 centimetres (2.4 in) TL.
