= Entomacrodus niuafoouensis =

Conservation status
- Least Concern (IUCN 3.1)

Scientific classification
- Kingdom: Animalia
- Phylum: Chordata
- Class: Actinopterygii
- Division: Teleostei
- Order: Blenniiformes
- Family: Blenniidae
- Genus: Entomacrodus
- Species: E. niuafoouensis

Binomial name
- Entomacrodus niuafoouensis (Fowler, 1932)

Synonyms
- Salarias niuafoouensis Fowler, 1932

Species of fish

Entomacrodus niuafoouensis, also known as the tattoo-chin rockskipper, is a species of combtooth blenny found in shallow waters of the Pacific and Western Indian Oceans.
