= Malacoctenus margaritae =

Conservation status
- Least Concern (IUCN 3.1)

Scientific classification
- Kingdom: Animalia
- Phylum: Chordata
- Class: Actinopterygii
- Order: Blenniiformes
- Family: Labrisomidae
- Genus: Malacoctenus
- Species: M. margaritae

Binomial name
- Malacoctenus margaritae (Fowler, 1944)

Synonyms
- Acteis margaritae Fowler, 1944

Species of fish

Malacoctenus margaritae, the Margarita blenny, is a species of labrisomid blenny native to the Pacific coast of Central America from Costa Rica to Panama. This species can reach a length of 6.5 centimetres (2.6 in) TL.
