= Malacoctenus versicolor =

Conservation status
- Least Concern (IUCN 3.1)

Scientific classification
- Kingdom: Animalia
- Phylum: Chordata
- Class: Actinopterygii
- Order: Blenniiformes
- Family: Labrisomidae
- Genus: Malacoctenus
- Species: M. versicolor

Binomial name
- Malacoctenus versicolor (Poey, 1876)

Synonyms
- Myxodes versicolor Poey, 1876

Species of fish

Malacoctenus versicolor, the Barfin blenny, is a species of labrisomid blenny native to the western Atlantic Ocean and the Caribbean Sea from southern Florida through the Antilles. It is an inhabitant of coral reefs preferring areas of rock or sand at depths of from near the surface to 7 metres (23 ft). This species can reach a length of 7.6 centimetres (3.0 in) TL.
