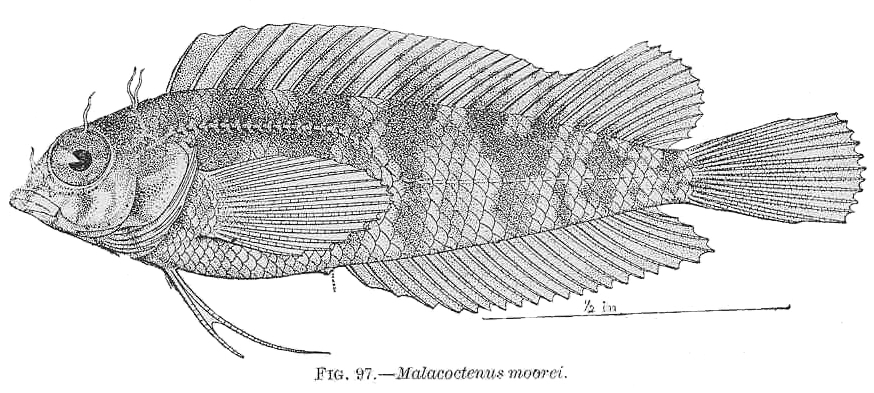

Conservation status
- Least Concern (IUCN 3.1)

Scientific classification
- Kingdom: Animalia
- Phylum: Chordata
- Class: Actinopterygii
- Order: Blenniiformes
- Family: Labrisomidae
- Genus: Malacoctenus
- Species: M. macropus

Binomial name
- Malacoctenus macropus (Poey, 1868)

Synonyms
- Myxodes macropus Poey, 1868

= Malacoctenus macropus =

Species of fish

Malacoctenus macropus, the Rosy blenny, is a species of labrisomid blenny native to the Atlantic Ocean including the Gulf of Mexico and the Caribbean Sea from southern Florida and the Bahamas to the northern coast of South America. This species inhabits a wide range of habitats including patch reefs, seagrass beds and sponge beds. It can be found at depths of from near the surface to 8 metres (26 ft) though it is more rarely found deeper than 2 metres (6.6 ft). This species can reach a length of 5.5 centimetres (2.2 in) TL. It can also be found in the aquarium trade.
