= Malacoctenus delalandii =

Conservation status
- Least Concern (IUCN 3.1)

Scientific classification
- Kingdom: Animalia
- Phylum: Chordata
- Class: Actinopterygii
- Order: Blenniiformes
- Family: Labrisomidae
- Genus: Malacoctenus
- Species: M. delalandii

Binomial name
- Malacoctenus delalandii (Valenciennes, 1836)

Synonyms
- Clinus delalandii Valenciennes, 1836; Malacoctenus delalandei (Valenciennes, 1836)

Species of fish

Malacoctenus delalandii is a species of labrisomid blenny native to the Atlantic Ocean and the Caribbean Sea from Guatemala to Brazil. This species is an inhabitant of coral reefs being found in sandy areas and around beds of the seagrass Thalassia testudinum. It can reach a length of 8.2 centimetres (3.2 in) TL. The specific name honours the French explorer and naturalist Pierre Antoine Delalande (1787-1823), who collected the type.
