= Entomacrodus chapmani =

Conservation status
- Vulnerable (IUCN 3.1)

Scientific classification
- Kingdom: Animalia
- Phylum: Chordata
- Class: Actinopterygii
- Order: Blenniiformes
- Family: Blenniidae
- Genus: Entomacrodus
- Species: E. chapmani

Binomial name
- Entomacrodus chapmani Springer, 1967

Species of fish

Entomacrodus chapmani is a species of combtooth blenny in the genus Entomacrodus. It is found in the southeast Pacific ocean, off the coast of Easter Island.

== Description ==
Entomacrodus chapmani is around 3.9 centimetres (1.5 in) long.
