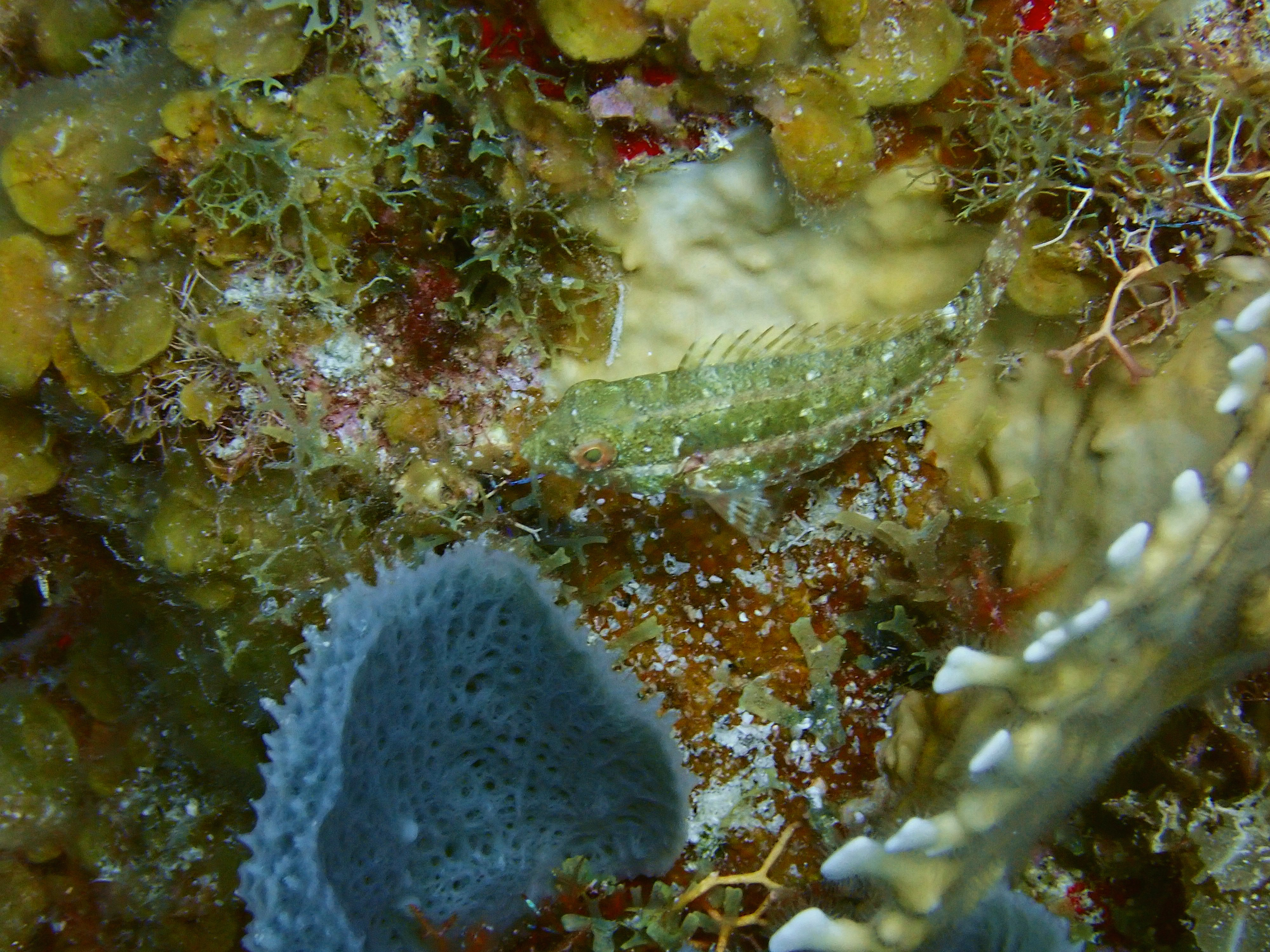

Conservation status
- Least Concern (IUCN 3.1)

Scientific classification
- Kingdom: Animalia
- Phylum: Chordata
- Class: Actinopterygii
- Order: Blenniiformes
- Family: Labrisomidae
- Genus: Malacoctenus
- Species: M. erdmani

Binomial name
- Malacoctenus erdmani C. L. Smith, 1957

= Malacoctenus erdmani =

Species of fish

Malacoctenus erdmani is a species of labrisomid blenny native to the western Atlantic Ocean and the Caribbean Sea from the Bahamas to Curaçao. This species is an inhabitant of reefs where it prefers areas that provide hiding places such as coral rubble and rock and patches of algae. It can reach a length of 3.8 centimetres (1.5 in) TL. The specific name honours the fishery biologist Donald S. Erdman.
