= Malacoctenus hubbsi =

Conservation status
- Least Concern (IUCN 3.1)

Scientific classification
- Kingdom: Animalia
- Phylum: Chordata
- Class: Actinopterygii
- Division: Teleostei
- Order: Blenniiformes
- Family: Labrisomidae
- Genus: Malacoctenus
- Species: M. hubbsi

Binomial name
- Malacoctenus hubbsi V. G. Springer, 1959

Species of fish

Malacoctenus hubbsi, the redside blenny, is a species of labrisomid blenny native to the Gulf of California extending to the Pacific coast of southern Baja California. It is found in rocky areas at depths of from 1 to 4 metres (3.3 to 13.1 ft). This species can reach a length of 9 centimetres (3.5 in) TL. The specific name honours the American ichthyologist Clark Hubbs (1921-2008).
