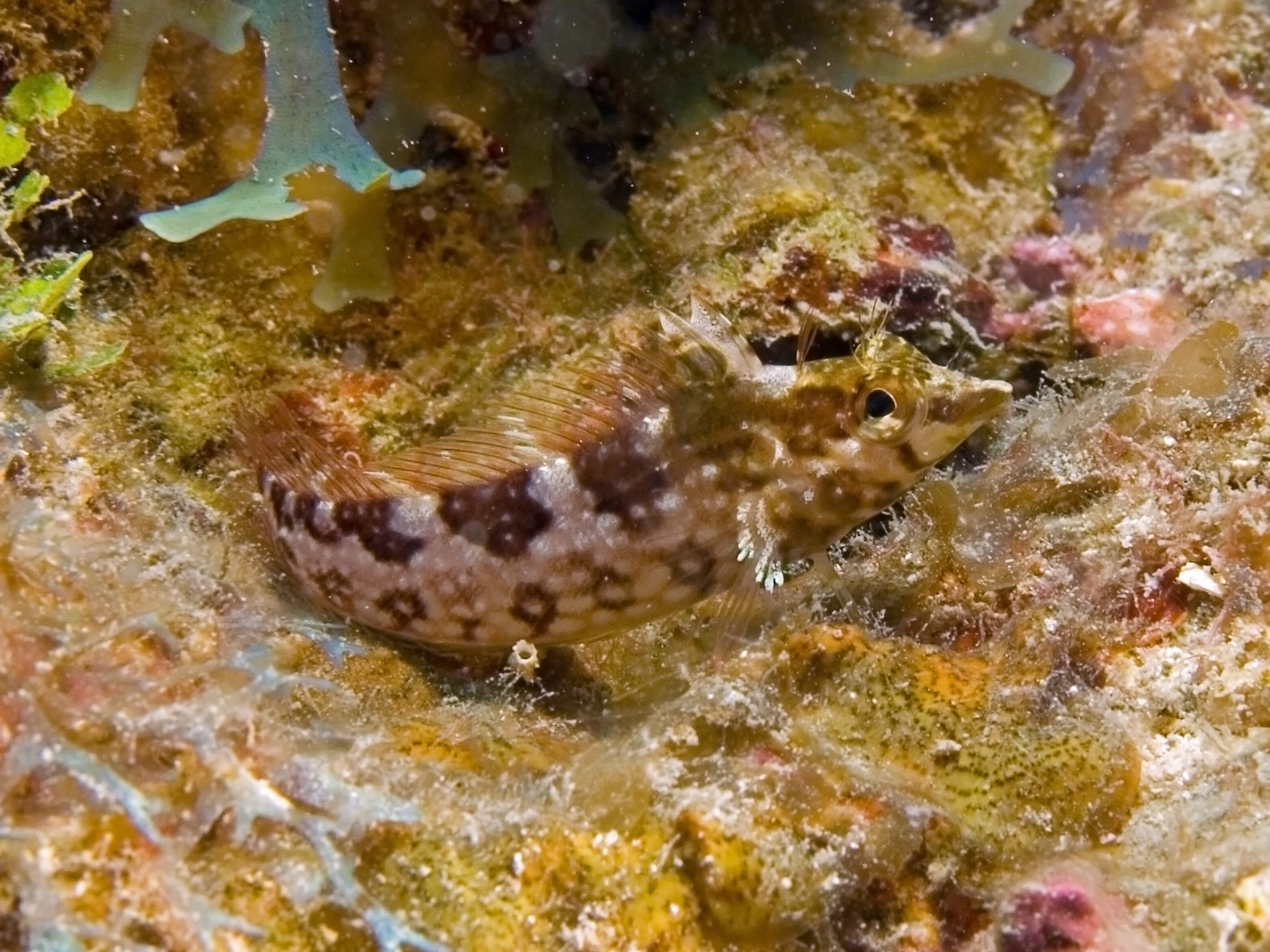

Conservation status
- Least Concern (IUCN 3.1)

Scientific classification
- Kingdom: Animalia
- Phylum: Chordata
- Class: Actinopterygii
- Order: Blenniiformes
- Family: Labrisomidae
- Genus: Malacoctenus
- Species: M. boehlkei

Binomial name
- Malacoctenus boehlkei V. G. Springer, 1959

= Malacoctenus boehlkei =

Species of fish

Malacoctenus boehlkei, the Diamond blenny, is a species of labrisomid blenny native to the central western Atlantic Ocean and the Caribbean Sea where it is an inhabitant of coral reefs at depths of from 5 to 70 metres (16 to 230 ft). This species can reach a length of 6.4 centimetres (2.5 in) TL. The specific name honour the ichthyologist James E. Böhlke (1930–1982), of the Academy of Natural Sciences of Philadelphia.
