= Entomacrodus caudofasciatus =

Conservation status
- Least Concern (IUCN 3.1)

Scientific classification
- Kingdom: Animalia
- Phylum: Chordata
- Class: Actinopterygii
- Division: Teleostei
- Order: Blenniiformes
- Family: Blenniidae
- Genus: Entomacrodus
- Species: E. caudofasciatus

Binomial name
- Entomacrodus caudofasciatus (Regan, 1909)

Synonyms
- Salarias caudofasciatus Regan, 1909; Salarias rarotongensis Whitley, 1965

Species of blenny

Entomacrodus caudofasciatus, the bartail blenny or bartailed rockskipper, is a species of combtooth blenny found in waters of depths down to 3 m (10 ft) in the Pacific and Eastern Indian Oceans.
