= Entomacrodus striatus =

Conservation status
- Least Concern (IUCN 3.1)

Scientific classification
- Kingdom: Animalia
- Phylum: Chordata
- Class: Actinopterygii
- Division: Teleostei
- Order: Blenniiformes
- Family: Blenniidae
- Genus: Entomacrodus
- Species: E. striatus

Binomial name
- Entomacrodus striatus (Valenciennes, 1836)

Synonyms
- Entomacrodes striatus (Valenciennes, 1836); Entomacrodus plurifilis marshallensis Schultz & Chapman, 1960; Salarias fraenatu Valenciennes, 1836; Salarias striatus Valenciennes, 1836

Species of ray-finned fish

Entomacrodus striatus, also known as the blackspotted rockskipper, is a species of combtooth blenny, ranging from coastal East Africa all the way to Polynesia.
