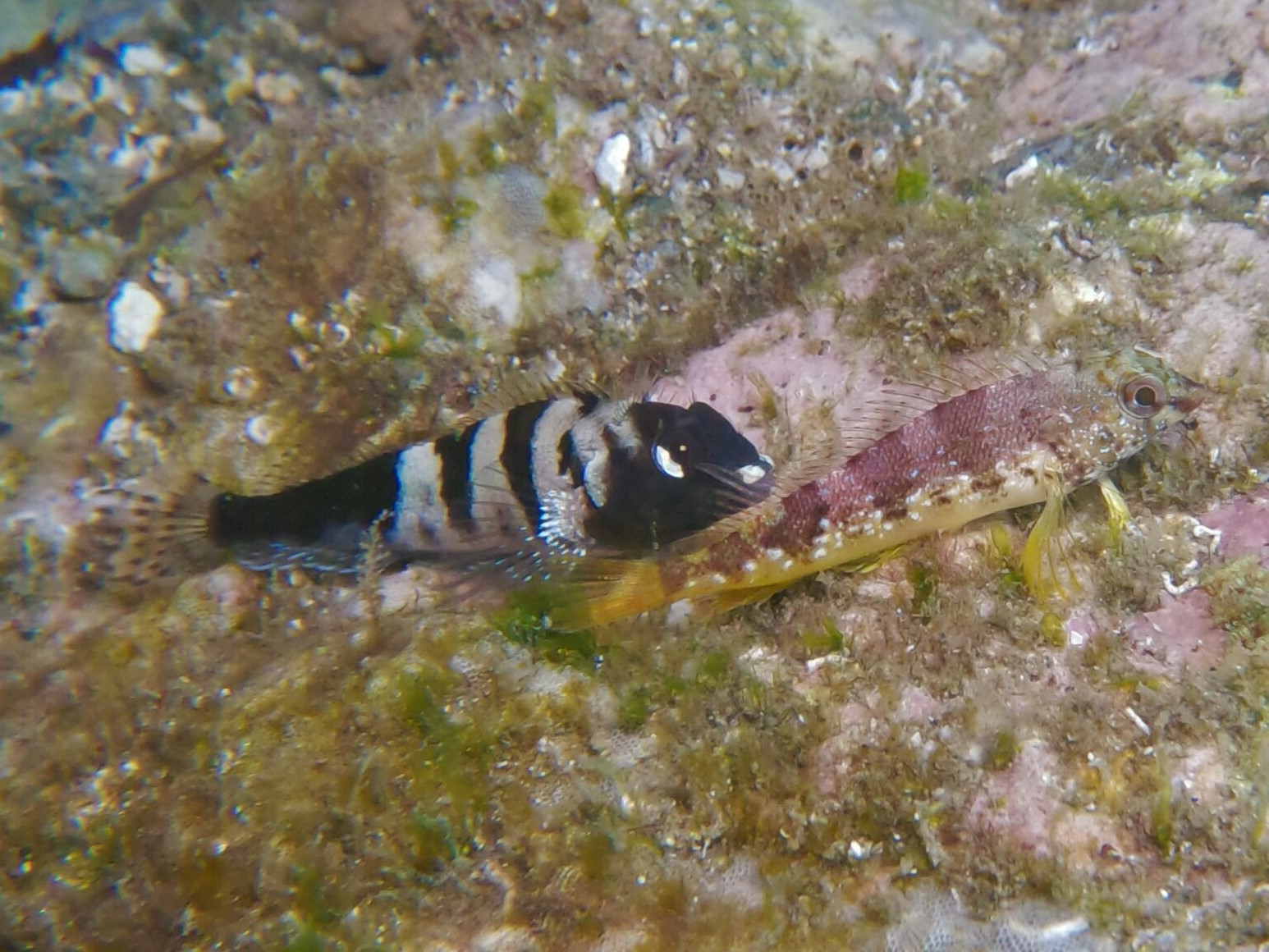

Conservation status
- Least Concern (IUCN 3.1)

Scientific classification
- Kingdom: Animalia
- Phylum: Chordata
- Class: Actinopterygii
- Order: Blenniiformes
- Family: Labrisomidae
- Genus: Malacoctenus
- Species: M. ebisui

Binomial name
- Malacoctenus ebisui V. G. Springer, 1959

= Malacoctenus ebisui =

Species of fish

Malacoctenus ebisui, the Fishgod blenny, is a species of labrisomid blenny native to the Pacific coast of the Americas from the Gulf of California to Panama. This species can reach a length of 6.5 centimetres (2.6 in) TL. The specific name refers to Ebisu, a Japanese god of fishermen, as does the common name.
