= Malacoctenus zonogaster =

Conservation status
- Vulnerable (IUCN 3.1)

Scientific classification
- Kingdom: Animalia
- Phylum: Chordata
- Class: Actinopterygii
- Order: Blenniiformes
- Family: Labrisomidae
- Genus: Malacoctenus
- Species: M. zonogaster

Binomial name
- Malacoctenus zonogaster Heller & Snodgrass, 1903

Species of fish

Malacoctenus zonogaster, the Belted blenny, is a species of labrisomid blenny mainly native to the Galápagos Islands (also scantly present along the Pacific coast from Baja California to Peru). It is an inhabitant of tide pools and rocky shores, being found from near the surface to 5 metres (16 ft). The species can reach a length of 8.5 centimetres (3.3 in) total length.
