= Pearl blenny =

Conservation status
- Least Concern (IUCN 3.1)

Scientific classification
- Kingdom: Animalia
- Phylum: Chordata
- Class: Actinopterygii
- Order: Blenniiformes
- Family: Blenniidae
- Genus: Entomacrodus
- Species: E. nigricans

Binomial name
- Entomacrodus nigricans Gill, 1859

Species of fish

The pearl blenny (Entomacrodus nigricans) is a species of combtooth blenny from the subfamily Salarinae of the family Blenniidae. It occurs in shallow coastal waters in the western Atlantic Ocean. It is the type species of the genus Entomacrodus.

== Description ==
Pearl blennies are pale in colour marked with dark brown bands and have extremely bright white spots along the length of their whole bodies. They have a blunt head and a high forehead with two moderately-sized eyes. They have filaments over the eyes and on the nape which are called cirri. When breeding the male's cirri and dorsal fins become enlarged. They have slender, sharp teeth, resembling combs, in their jaws. There are 13 spines and 14-15 soft rays in the dorsal fin while the anal fin has 2 spines and 16 rays. This species may attain a Total Length of 10 centimetres (3.9 in). The flattened eyes are thought to be an adaptation for seeing in air.

== Distribution ==
The pearl blenny is found in the western central Atlantic where its distributions stretches from Bermuda to southeastern Florida, west to the Gulf of Mexico where it ranges from the Florida Keys to Campeche, Mexico, and south through the Caribbean Sea.

== Habitat and ecology ==
The pearl blenny prefers shallow waters and they are normally recorded close to the surface, as well as in tidal pools or rocks pools. The smaller individuals stay lower down in the water column so that they can avoid harsher conditions. They are largely diurnal feeders, mainly feeding on algae. They can survive on land but prefer to remain in water. Their flattish eye gives then a vision something like that of a bird. They are able to survive out of water in shade for around 2.5 hours which extends to 3.5 hours during the night but only 7 minutes in direct sunlight.

The males choose small crevices or empty shells which they clean out and the female will spawn into these. The eggs have an adhesive pad with which they stick to the internal surface of the nest. The males guard the eggs and often fan them until they have hatched.
