= Opeatogenys =

Scientific classification
- Kingdom: Animalia
- Phylum: Chordata
- Class: Actinopterygii
- Order: Blenniiformes
- Family: Gobiesocidae
- Subfamily: Gobiesocinae
- Genus: Opeatogenys; Briggs, 1955

Type species
- Mirbelia gracilis Canestrini, 1864

Genus of fishes

Opeatogenys is a genus of clingfishes. The two species occur in the eastern Atlantic Ocean with one being found also in the Mediterranean Sea.

== Species ==
There are currently two recognized species in this genus:

- Opeatogenys cadenati Briggs, 1957
- Opeatogenys gracilis (Canestrini, 1864)
