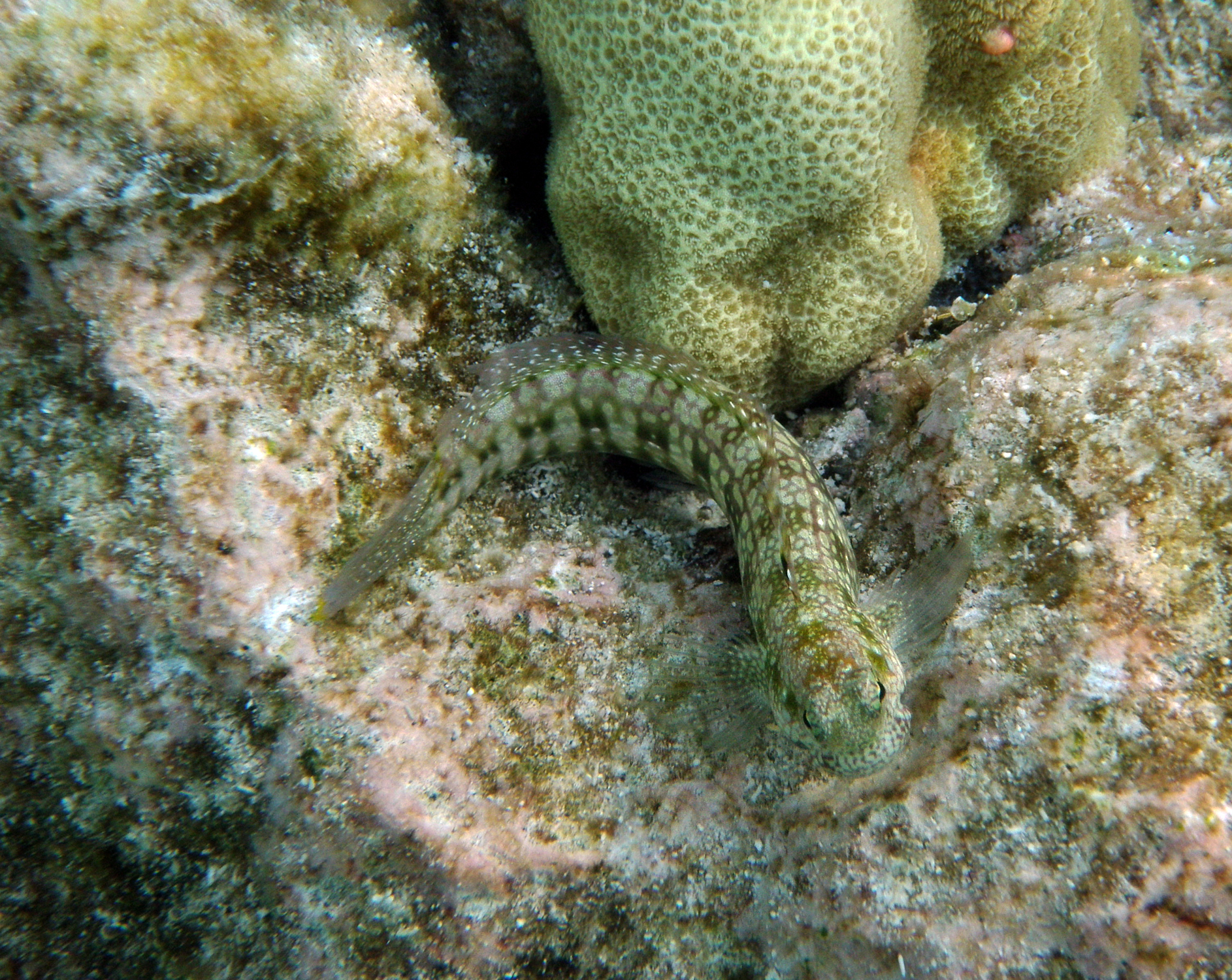
- Rockskipper (E. marmoratus)

Scientific classification
- Kingdom: Animalia
- Phylum: Chordata
- Class: Actinopterygii
- Order: Blenniiformes
- Family: Blenniidae
- Subfamily: Salariinae
- Genus: Entomacrodus; T. N. Gill, 1859

Type species
- Entomacrodus nigricans Gill, 1859

= Entomacrodus =

Genus of fishes

Entomacrodus is a genus of combtooth blennies.

== Species ==
There are currently 27 recognized species in this genus:

- Entomacrodus cadenati V. G. Springer, 1967 (West African rockhopper)
- Entomacrodus caudofasciatus (Regan, 1909) (Tail-barred rockskipper)
- Entomacrodus chapmani V. G. Springer, 1967 (Chapman's blenny)
- Entomacrodus chiostictus (D. S. Jordan & C. H. Gilbert, 1882) (Rock blenny)
- Entomacrodus corneliae (Fowler, 1932)
- Entomacrodus cymatobiotus L. P. Schultz & W. M. Chapman, 1960 (Pacific rockskipper)
- Entomacrodus decussatus (Bleeker, 1858) (Wavy-lined blenny)
- Entomacrodus epalzeocheilos (Bleeker, 1859) (Fringelip rockskipper)
- Entomacrodus lemuria V. G. Springer & R. Fricke, 2000
- Entomacrodus lighti (Herre, 1938)
- Entomacrodus longicirrus V. G. Springer, 1967
- Entomacrodus macrospilus V. G. Springer, 1967
- Entomacrodus marmoratus (E. T. Bennett, 1828) (Rockskipper)
- Entomacrodus nigricans T. N. Gill, 1859 (Pearl blenny)
- Entomacrodus niuafoouensis (Fowler, 1932) (Tattoo-chin rockskipper)
- Entomacrodus randalli V. G. Springer, 1967
- Entomacrodus rofeni V. G. Springer, 1967
- Entomacrodus sealei Bryan & Herre, 1903 (Seale's rockskipper)
- Entomacrodus solus J. T. Williams & Bogorodsky, 2010
- Entomacrodus stellifer (D. S. Jordan & Snyder, 1902) (Stellar rockskipper)
- Entomacrodus strasburgi V. G. Springer, 1967 (Strasburg's blenny)
- Entomacrodus striatus (Valenciennes, 1836) (Blackspotted rockskipper)
- Entomacrodus textilis (Valenciennes, 1836) (Textile blenny)
- Entomacrodus thalassinus (D. S. Jordan & Seale, 1906) (Sea blenny)
- Entomacrodus vermiculatus (Valenciennes, 1836) (Vermiculated blenny)
- Entomacrodus vomerinus (Valenciennes, 1836)
- Entomacrodus williamsi V. G. Springer & R. Fricke, 2000
