= Entomacrodus cadenati =

Conservation status
- Least Concern (IUCN 3.1)

Scientific classification
- Kingdom: Animalia
- Phylum: Chordata
- Class: Actinopterygii
- Order: Blenniiformes
- Family: Blenniidae
- Genus: Entomacrodus
- Species: E. cadenati

Binomial name
- Entomacrodus cadenati V. G. Springer, 1967

Species of fish

Entomacrodus cadenati is a species of fish in the family Blenniidae.

It is found in the waters of West-African countries such as Guinea, Senegal, Cape Verde, Equatorial Guinea and São Tomé and Príncipe. The adults occur on rocky coastlines. It is an oviparous species which lays demersal eggs which adhere to the substrate by an adhesive filamentouspad or pedestal. The larvae are planktonic and are frequently found in shallow coastal waters, between depths of 0–3 metres (0.0–9.8 ft). The specific name honours the French ichthyologist Jean Cadenat (1908-1992) who was the Director of the Marine Biological Section of the Institute Français d'Afrique Noire in Gorée, Senegal, the collector of the type specimens and who sent them to Springer to assist him in his study of the marine fish of Africa.
