= Malacoctenus zacae =

Conservation status
- Least Concern (IUCN 3.1)

Scientific classification
- Kingdom: Animalia
- Phylum: Chordata
- Class: Actinopterygii
- Order: Blenniiformes
- Family: Labrisomidae
- Genus: Malacoctenus
- Species: M. zacae

Binomial name
- Malacoctenus zacae V. G. Springer, 1959

Species of fish

Malacoctenus zacae, the Zaca blenny, is a species of labrisomid blenny native to the Pacific coast of Mexico from Baja California to Acapulco. This species can reach a length of 6.5 centimetres (2.6 in) TL.
