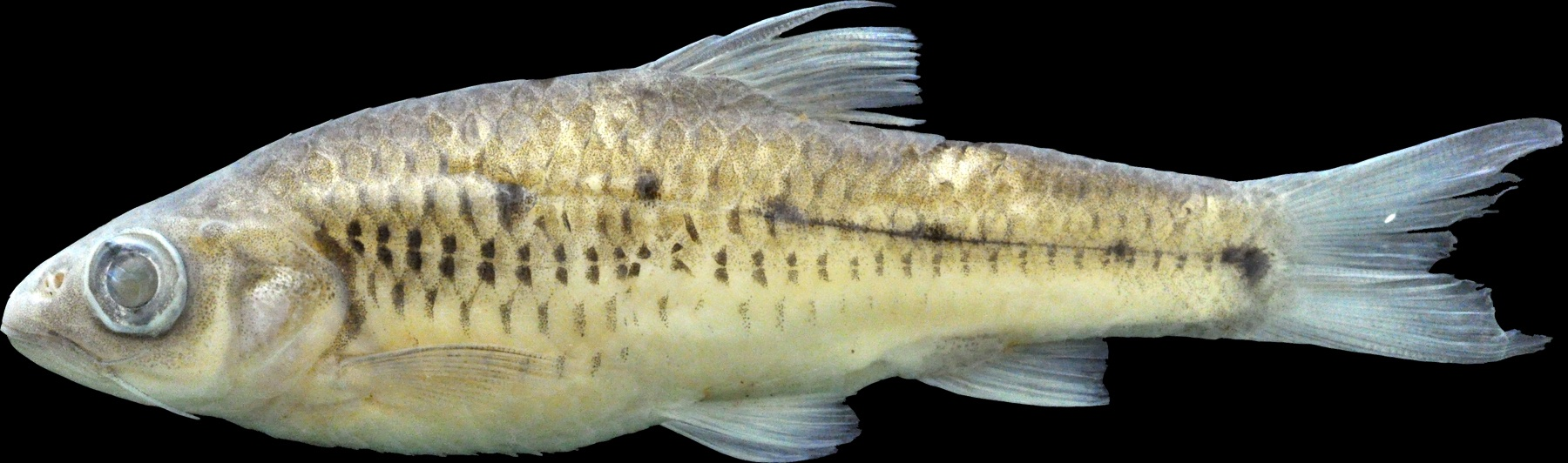
- Barbus cadenati

Conservation status
- Vulnerable (IUCN 3.1)

Scientific classification
- Domain: Eukaryota
- Kingdom: Animalia
- Phylum: Chordata
- Class: Actinopterygii
- Order: Cypriniformes
- Family: Cyprinidae
- Subfamily: Smiliogastrinae
- Genus: Enteromius
- Species: E. cadenati

Binomial name
- Enteromius cadenati (Daget, 1962)

Synonyms
- Barbus cadenati Daget, 1962

= Enteromius cadenati =

Species of fish

Enteromius cadenati is a species of ray-finned fish in the genus Enteromius which is endemic to the Konkouré basin in Guinea.

== Size ==
This species reaches a length of 7.1 cm (2.8 in).

== Etymology ==
The fish is named in honor of ichthyologist Jean Cadenat (1908-1992), the Director of the Marine Biological Section of the Institut Français d’Afrique Noire, who collected one specimen of the fish in 1947.
