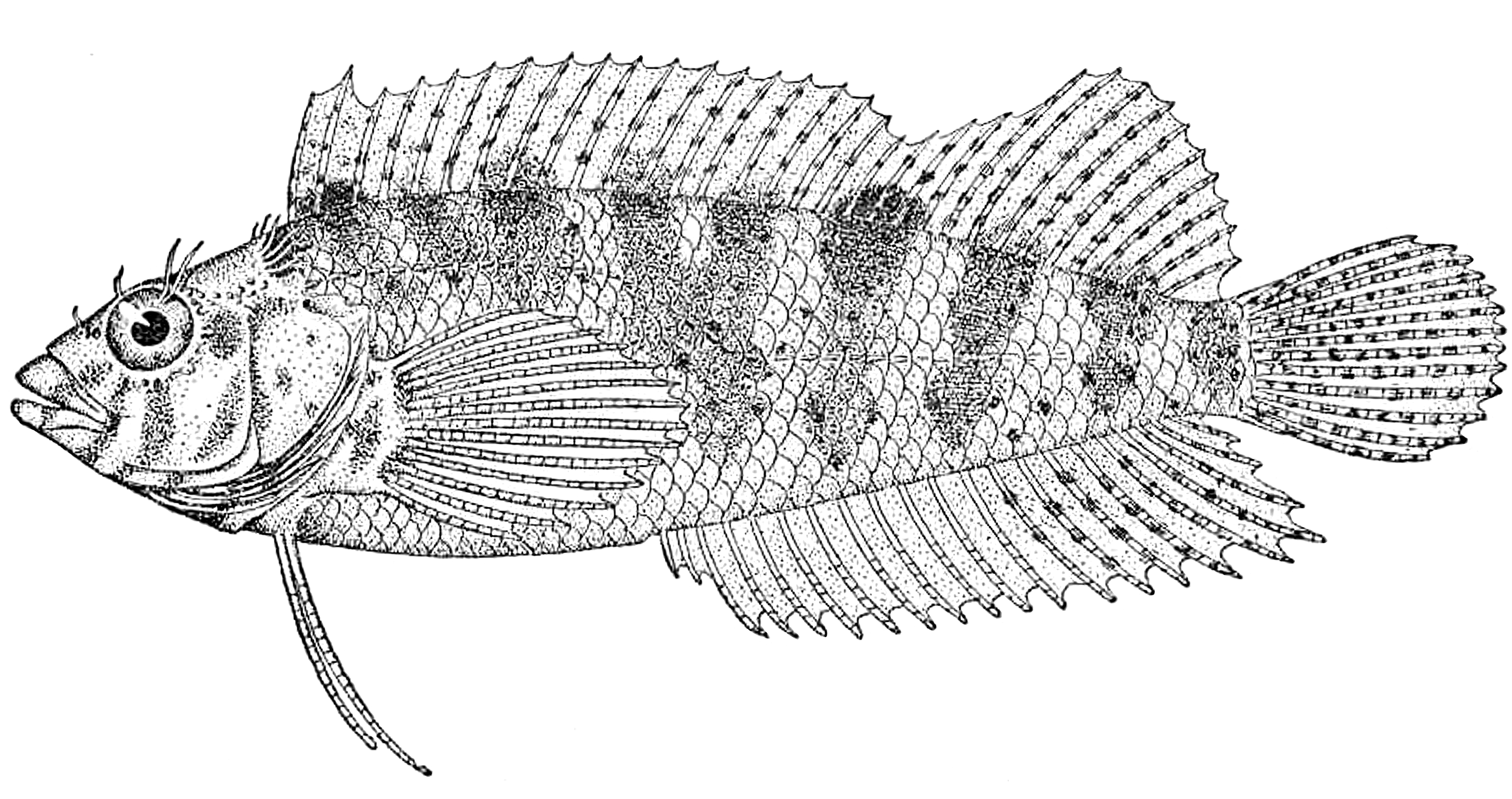

Conservation status
- Least Concern (IUCN 3.1)

Scientific classification
- Kingdom: Animalia
- Phylum: Chordata
- Class: Actinopterygii
- Order: Blenniiformes
- Family: Labrisomidae
- Genus: Malacoctenus
- Species: M. gilli

Binomial name
- Malacoctenus gilli (Steindachner, 1867)

Synonyms
- Clinus gilli Steindachner, 1867; Labrisomus biguttatus Cope, 1871; Malacoctenus biguttatus (Cope, 1871); Malacoctenus puertoricensis Evermann & M.C. Marsh, 1899

= Malacoctenus gilli =

Species of fish

Malacoctenus gilli, the dusky blenny, is a species of labrisomid blenny native to the Atlantic Ocean including the Gulf of Mexico and the Caribbean Sea from the Bahamas to the north coast of South America.

== Characteristics ==
This species inhabits reef patches, areas of sandy substrates with available rocks and beds of seagrass at depths of from 1 to 5 metres (3.3 to 16.4 ft). It can reach a length of 7.6 centimetres (3.0 in) TL. The person honoured in the patronym of this species was not identified by Steindachner but it is most probably the American ichthyologist Theodore Nicholas Gill (1837-1914), the authority for the generic name Malacoctenus.
