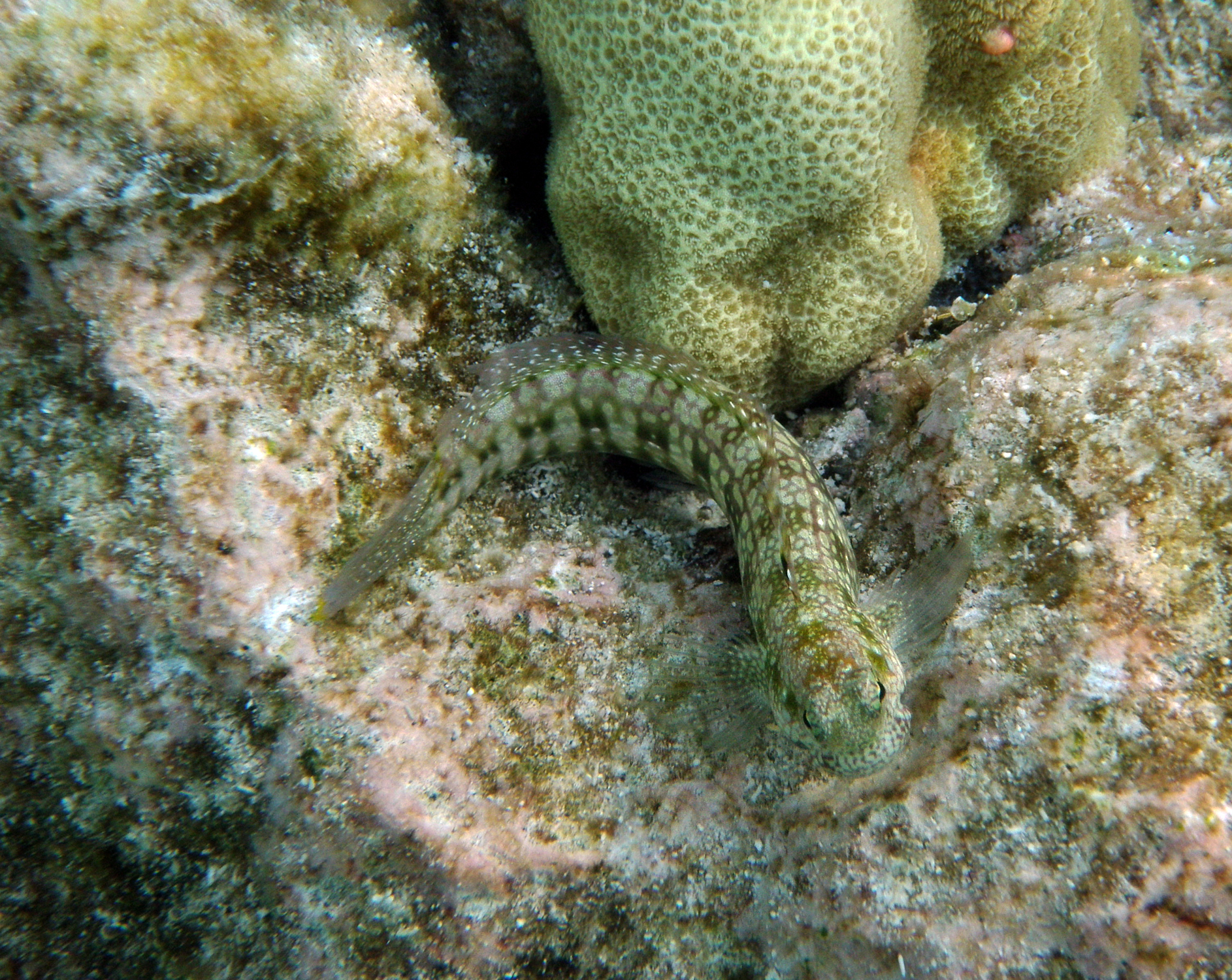

Conservation status
- Least Concern (IUCN 3.1)

Scientific classification
- Kingdom: Animalia
- Phylum: Chordata
- Class: Actinopterygii
- Order: Blenniiformes
- Family: Blenniidae
- Genus: Entomacrodus
- Species: E. marmoratus

Binomial name
- Entomacrodus marmoratus (Bennett, 1828)

= Entomacrodus marmoratus =

Species of fish

Entomacrodus marmoratus, also called the marbled blenny or pāo'o in Hawaiian, is a species of blenny endemic to the rocky reefs around the coasts of Hawaii. It has fins that are used to jump out of the water and to navigate the tide pools.

== Description ==
The marbled blenny has a long, narrow body and can grow up to a maximum length of about 8 cm (3 in). It has dark-colored skin with white spots and are recognized by an "eyelash" above its eyes. The marbled blenny lays its eggs on the seabed and attaches them to the substrate with a sticky base, while larvae, in a manner similar to plankton, drift in open water and are found off the coast of the Hawaiian Islands. The marbled blenny also has fins that are used to jump out of the water and to navigate tide pools.

== Distribution and habitat ==
The marbled blenny is found in the Pacific Ocean, specifically in the waters off the coast of the Hawaiian Islands, typically in shallow, rocky areas along the shore. It can live at depths of up to 6 m (20 ft). Its diet consists mainly of organic material and tiny invertebrates.

== Cultural significance ==
The marbled blenny is used by Native Hawaiians as bait and as a food item, traditionally cooked in ti leaves or eaten raw. The marbled blenny also appears in the Hawaiian legend of Hainakolo. Additionally, the marbled blenny was used by Hawaiian priests in certain practices, as it was believed to free someone from feelings of infatuation.
