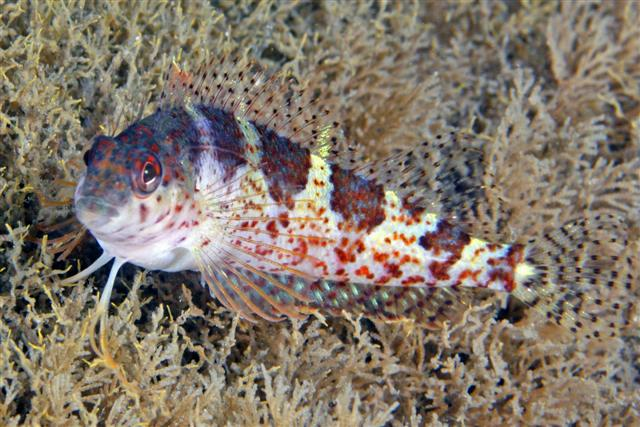

Conservation status
- Least Concern (IUCN 3.1)

Scientific classification
- Kingdom: Animalia
- Phylum: Chordata
- Class: Actinopterygii
- Order: Blenniiformes
- Family: Labrisomidae
- Genus: Malacoctenus
- Species: M. triangulatus

Binomial name
- Malacoctenus triangulatus V. G. Springer, 1959

= Malacoctenus triangulatus =

Species of fish

Malacoctenus triangulatus, the saddled blenny, is a species of labrisomid blenny fish native to the Atlantic Ocean as well as the Gulf of Mexico and the Caribbean Sea from southern Florida to the coast of Brazil. It inhabits rocky shores and reefs at depths of from near the surface to 40 metres (130 ft) though most common shallower than 3 metres (9.8 ft). This species can reach a length of 7.5 centimetres (3.0 in) TL. It can also be found in the aquarium trade.
