= Opeatogenys cadenati =

Conservation status
- Data Deficient (IUCN 3.1)

Scientific classification
- Kingdom: Animalia
- Phylum: Chordata
- Class: Actinopterygii
- Order: Blenniiformes
- Family: Gobiesocidae
- Genus: Opeatogenys
- Species: O. cadenati

Binomial name
- Opeatogenys cadenati Briggs, 1957

Species of fish

Opeatogenys cadenati is a species of clingfish from the family Gobiesocidae. It occurs in the eastern Atlantic and has been recorded off Ghana, Senegal and Morocco, as well as off the Canary Islands. This species was described by John C. Briggs in 1957 with a type locality of Chenal de Joal off Senegal. Briggs honoured the French ichthyologist Jean Cadenat (1908-1992) who was Director of the Marine Biological Section of the Institut Français d'Afrique Noire in Gorée, Senegal.
