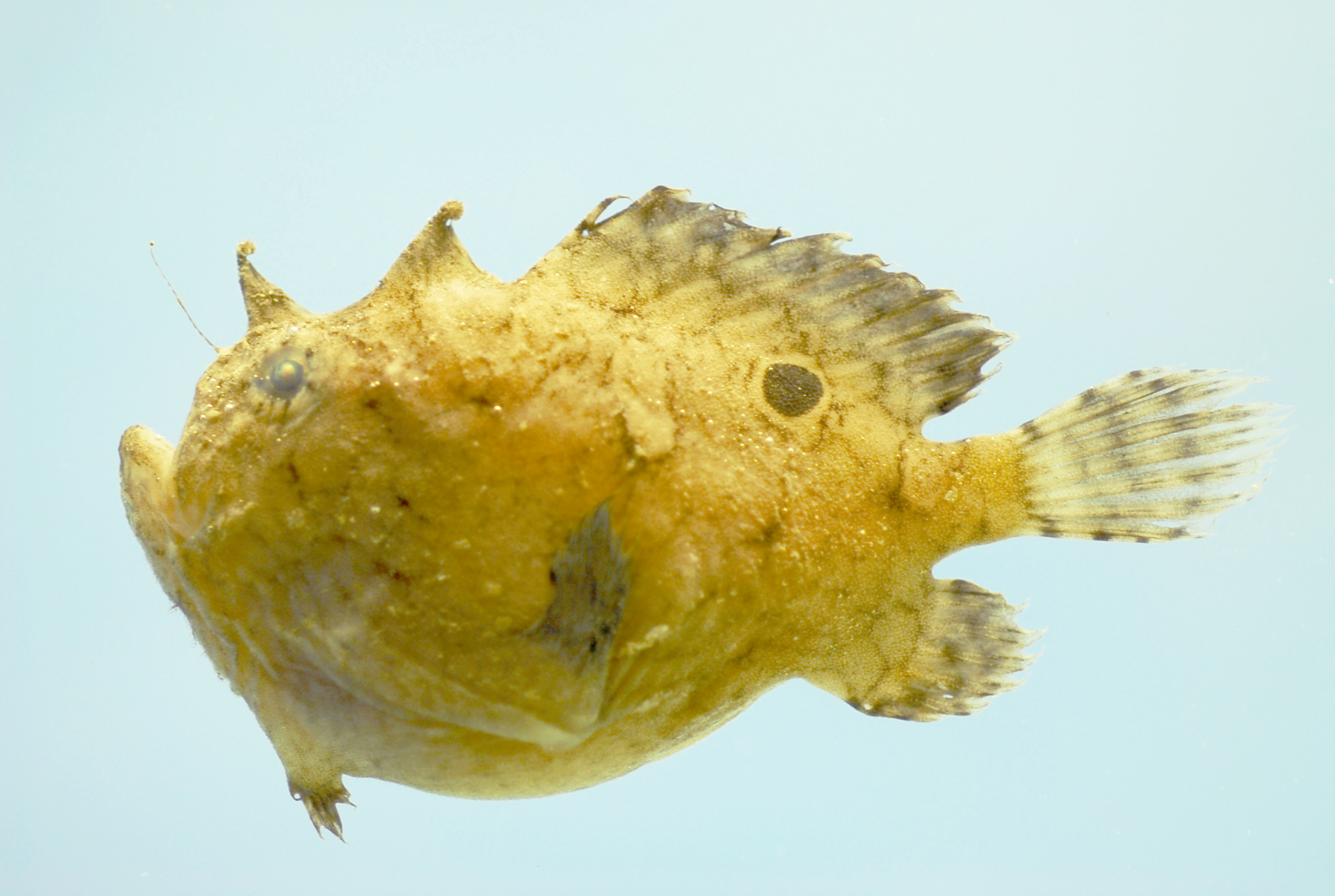

Conservation status
- Least Concern (IUCN 3.1)

Scientific classification
- Kingdom: Animalia
- Phylum: Chordata
- Class: Actinopterygii
- Order: Lophiiformes
- Family: Antennariidae
- Genus: Fowlerichthys
- Species: F. radiosus

Binomial name
- Fowlerichthys radiosus (Garman, 1896)

Synonyms
- Antennarius radiosus Garman, 1896; Fowlerichthys floridanus T. Barbour, 1941; Kanazawaichthys scutatus Schultz, 1957

= Fowlerichthys radiosus =

Species of fish

Fowlerichthys radiosus, the singlespot frogfish or big-eyed frogfish, is a species of marine ray-finned fish belonging to the family Antennariidae, the frogfishes. This fish is found in the Western Atlantic Ocean.

== Taxonomy ==
Fowlerichthys radiosus was first formally described as Antennarius radiosus in 1869 by the American zoologist Samuel Garman with its type locality given as off Key West in Florida. In 1941 Thomas Barbour described a new species, Fowlerichthys floridanus, from off Palm Beach, Florida and classified it in a new genus called Fowlerichthys and designated F. floridanus as its type species. F. floridanus is now considered to be a junior synonym of Antennarius radiosus. The 5th edition of Fishes of the World classifies the genus Fowlerichthys in the family Antennariidae within the suborder Antennarioidei within the order Lophiiformes, the anglerfishes.

== Etymology ==
Fowlerichthys radiosus has the genus name Fowlerichthys which combines Fowler, honouring the American ichthyologist Henry Weed Fowler of the Academy of Natural Sciences of Philadelphia who gave Barbour the type specimen of the type species of the genus, F. floridanus, with ichthys, which means fish. The specific name, radiosus, means "rayed", a reference to illicium being twice as long as that of its presumed congener Antennarius tigris.

== Description ==
Fowlerichthys radiosus has a somewhat compressed, globose body with the large eyes placed on the sides of the head and a large upwardly pointing mouth with many small teeth. The small gill openings are located to the rear and below the base of the pectoral fin, which is limb-like with and elbow like joint and broad connection to the body. There are 3 dorsal spines and a dorsal fin which contains 13 soft rays. The first dorsal spine, the illicium is roughly equal in length to the second dorsal spine and is topped with a small esca which is a small folded oval. The second dorsal spine is not very curved and is connected to the skin on the head by a membrane. The third dorsal spine is moveable and is not connected to the skin on the head. The anal fin contains 9 soft rays, there is a caudal peduncle and the rear edges of the dorsal and anal fins are not connected to the caudal fin. The skin on the body has a dense covering of bifurcated spicules. The color of this fish is brown to beige, the anal, caudal and dorsal fins are sometimes barred/ The illicium is normally marked with pale bands. There is a single large ocellus on the upper body and the base of the dorsal fin and there are short dark lines radiating out from the eye. Fishbase gives the maximum published standard length of 9.4 cm (3.7 in) for this species but the Smithsonian Tropical Research Institute gives the maximum length as 25 cm (9.8 in).

== Distribution and habitat ==
Fowlerichthys radiosus is found in the Western Atlantic Ocean from Long Island in New York south to Cuba and the Gulf of Mexico, and along the northern South American coast between Colombia and Surinam. It has also been reported from Madeira in the eastern Atlantic. The singlespot frogfish is found at depths between 20 and 275 m (66 and 902 ft) on offshore banks and the deeper waters of the continental shelf.

== Biology ==
Fowlerichthys radiosus is an aggressive, piscivorous predator but when it is not hunting it is a rather sedentary fish. The female's ovaries resemble tightly wound double scrolls and when they lay eggs these are encased in a gelatinous mass which floats. The prejuveniles of the singlespot frogfish do through a developmental stage called the "scutatus stage" in which bony plates extend backwards from the cranium to past the level of the opercular bones.
