= Jean Cadenat =

French ichthyologist (1908–1992)

Jean Cadenat (born Marmande, Lot-et-Garonne 16 April 1908, died Marmande 28 June 1992) was a French ichthyologist.

== Biography ==
In 1930, he joined the Agricultural Zoology station at La Grand Ferrade as an assistant preparator and the following year he completed his BSc (license) at the University of Bordeaux. From January 1932 to December 1941 he was at La Rochelle as an assistant in the Laboratory of G. Belloc at the Scientific and Technical Office of Fisheries then headed by Edouard Le Danois. During this period, he participated in many research expeditions, firstly aboard trawlers to the coasts of Ireland, France, Spain, Morocco and Mauritania, as well as participating in the fifth scientific cruise of the President Theodore Tissier in 1936 which travelled from the Canary Islands to the coast of Sierra Leone. In 1934, he began his military service in the French Navy, serving aboard Fisheries Patrols. In 1939, he was mobilised back to active service in La Rochelle. When he was demobilised in July 1940, he was seconded as head of laboratory to the Scientific and Technical Office of Maritime Fisheries, part of the General Inspectorate of Livestock Services in Dakar. He was then recruited as an assistant at the French Institute of North Africa (L'Institut Français de l'Afrique du Nord) in 1946. Professor Théodore Monod charged him with the setting up of an oceanographic and biological research station on the island of Gorée, where he was to remain until his retirement in 1965. During his nineteen years at the station, he undertook many expeditions to meet indigenous fishermen from Mauritania to Nigeria and just as many expeditions at sea along the African coast and to the Antilles, as well sailing to Guyana via the Cape Verde Islands. These expeditions enabled him to amass very diverse collection of specimens and study materials, the classification and description of which he was to devote much of his time. This eventually came under the aegis of Office de la recherche scientifique et technique outre-mer (ORSTOM).

He described numerous new species of fish and published regional faunas, such as the Les Poissons de Senegal in 1950, as well as works of identification such as La clef de determination des poissons de mer signale dans l'Atlantique Oriental entre le 20e parallel et le 15e parallel in 1970, a collaboration with Jacques Blache and A. Stauch. Over the years he published many notes and observations but these did not only relate to teleosts, as he also published on elasmobranchs, marine mammals, sea turtles and some crustaceans. He also published a series notes on the ichthyology of West Africa which were published in the IFAN Bulletin from 1949 to 1966. Jean Cadenat was primarily a field ichthyologist, always ready to go on an expedition and get on board a research boat. He possessed the remarkable gift of detecting, at first glance, the rare or new species that had never been studied before. He was also a great collector of African Art. He was a member of the Zoological Society of France, Société zoologique de France, a correspondent of the MNHN in Paris and he had been an honorary member of the French ichthyological society, Société française d'ichtyologie, since its foundation in October 1976. He died on 28 June 1992 in Marmande, to where he had retired.

== Legacy ==
Jean Cadenat is honoured in the scientific names of many species, including two genera of flatworms Cadanatella, including the species Cadenatella cadenati Dollfus, 1946, and Jeancadenatia, as well as Nybelinia cadenati which were named after him in 1946 by the parasitologist Robert-Phillipe Dollfus. He is also honoured in the names of the hermit crab Paguristes cadenati Forest, 1954, the copepod Hatschekia cadenati Nunes-Ruivo, 1954 and the acanthocephalan Rhadinorhynchus cadenati (Golvan & Houin, 1964).

As an ichthyologist he is also honoured in the specific names of the following fishes:

- Bembrops cadenati Das & Nelson, 1996
- Merluccius polli cadenati Doutre, 1960
- Diplodus cadenati de la Paz, Bauchot & Daget, 1974
- Dagetichthys cadenati (Chabanaud, 1948)
- Pegusa cadenati Chabanaud, 1954
- Cynoglossus cadenati Chabanaud, 1947
- Uranoscopus cadenati Poll, 1959
- Opeatogenys cadenati Briggs, 1957
- Entomacrodus cadenati Springer, 1967
- Enteromius cadenati (Daget, 1962)
- Chromis cadenati Whitley, 1951
- Hoplostethus cadenati Quéro, 1974
- Coloconger cadenati Kanazawa, 1961
- Cruriraja cadenati Bigelow & Schroeder, 1962

== See also ==
- Category:Taxa named by Jean Cadenat
