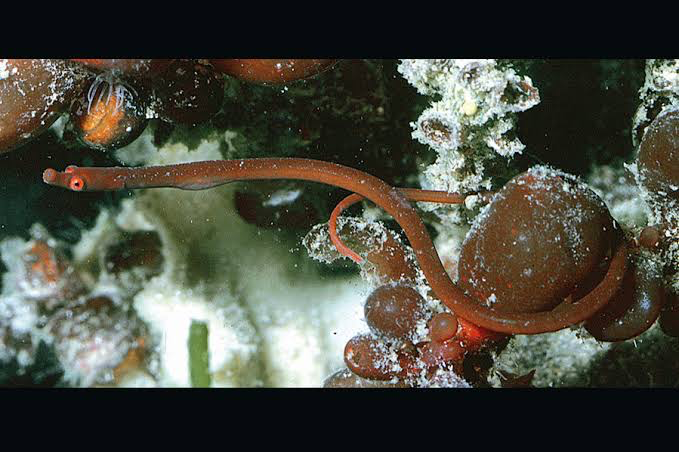
- Notiocampus ruber

Conservation status
- Least Concern (IUCN 3.1)

Scientific classification
- Kingdom: Animalia
- Phylum: Chordata
- Class: Actinopterygii
- Order: Syngnathiformes
- Family: Syngnathidae
- Subfamily: Syngnathinae
- Genus: Notiocampus; C. E. Dawson, 1979
- Species: N. ruber

Binomial name
- Notiocampus ruber (E. P. Ramsay & J. D. Ogilby, 1886)

Synonyms
- Nannocampus ruber Ramsay & Ogilby, 1886

= Notiocampus =

Species of fish

Notiocampus ruber, known commonly as the red pipefish, is a species of pipefish endemic to the temperate waters along the southern coast of Australia, including Tasmania. It occurs at depths from 5 to 20 m (16 to 66 ft) over the continental shelf. This species grows to a length of 16.4 cm (6.5 in) and is the only known member of its genus. N. ruber is a historically understudied species, with fewer than 12 records nationally prior to 2021, and its reproductive morphology and phylogenetic placement remained unresolved for more than four decades after the genus was described by C. E. Dawson in 1979.

== Distribution and habitat ==
Notiocampus ruber has a broad but sparsely recorded distribution across temperate southern Australia, ranging from New South Wales to Western Australia and including Tasmania. Records are primarily from reef crevices and hard substrates at depths of 5 to 20 m (16 to 66 ft). Observations from Gamay (Botany Bay), New South Wales, between 2017 and 2021 documented individuals at approximately 12 m (39 ft) depth in mixed habitats comprising sand substrates and low-relief hard structures, frequently among feathery red macroalgae. The first known photograph of a living specimen was taken on the Fleurieu Peninsula, South Australia, in 2007–2008.

Individuals are typically observed alone or in pairs, though aggregations of multiple individuals have been recorded. At least one individual exhibited short-term site fidelity, being repeatedly observed at the same location over a six-month period.

== Description ==
Notiocampus ruber has an elongate, vermiform body and is typically uniformly red in colouration, though some individuals display distinct colouration markings on the head and snout, as well as scattered white speckling on the body. Whether these features are sex-specific is unknown. The species lacks pectoral fins entirely and has low, entire body ridges, in contrast to the prominent spiny body ridges of several related pipefish genera. Unlike the northeastern Atlantic genera Nerophis and Entelurus, which it otherwise resembles, Notiocampus retains a caudal fin and possesses a dorsal fin originating on the tail rather than on the trunk.

== Reproduction ==
Notiocampus ruber is a trunk-brooding pipefish, with photographic evidence of a brooding male carrying eggs attached directly to the ventral trunk surface anterior to the anus first published in 2026. The brooding configuration is believed to comprise at least two parallel rows of relatively large, exposed eggs adhered directly to the ventral integument without enclosing folds. This simple trunk-brooding morphology corresponds to that described for the northeastern Atlantic genera Nerophis and Entelurus.

== Taxonomy and phylogeny ==
Notiocampus ruber was originally described as Nannocampus ruber by E. P. Ramsay and J. D. Ogilby in 1886. The genus Notiocampus was erected for the species by C. E. Dawson in 1979. The species has historically been excluded from molecular phylogenetic datasets owing to the absence of available genetic material, leaving its subfamilial placement unverified for decades.

The 2026 confirmation of ventral trunk brooding supports the placement of Notiocampus within the subfamily Nerophinae, the earliest-diverging clade within Syngnathidae. This makes Notiocampus one of four endemic southern Australian trunk-brooding pipefish genera, alongside Heraldia, Maroubra, and Leptoichthys.

Notiocampus shares with Nerophis and Entelurus a suite of derived characters including complete loss of pectoral fins, low entire body ridges, an elongate vermiform body, and exposed eggs attached directly to the trunk integument. These shared characters suggest that Notiocampus may have a closer affinity with the tribe Nerophini (containing Nerophis, Entelurus, and Leptoichthys) than with other nerophine lineages. The geographically disjunct distribution between Notiocampus (southern Australia) and Nerophis/Entelurus (northeastern Atlantic) may reflect either historical connectivity among early nerophine lineages with ancient Tethyan distributions or convergent evolution under ecological conditions favouring a cryptic, benthic lifestyle.

== Conservation status ==
Notiocampus ruber is listed as Least Concern on the IUCN Red List, although it is sparsely documented across its range.
