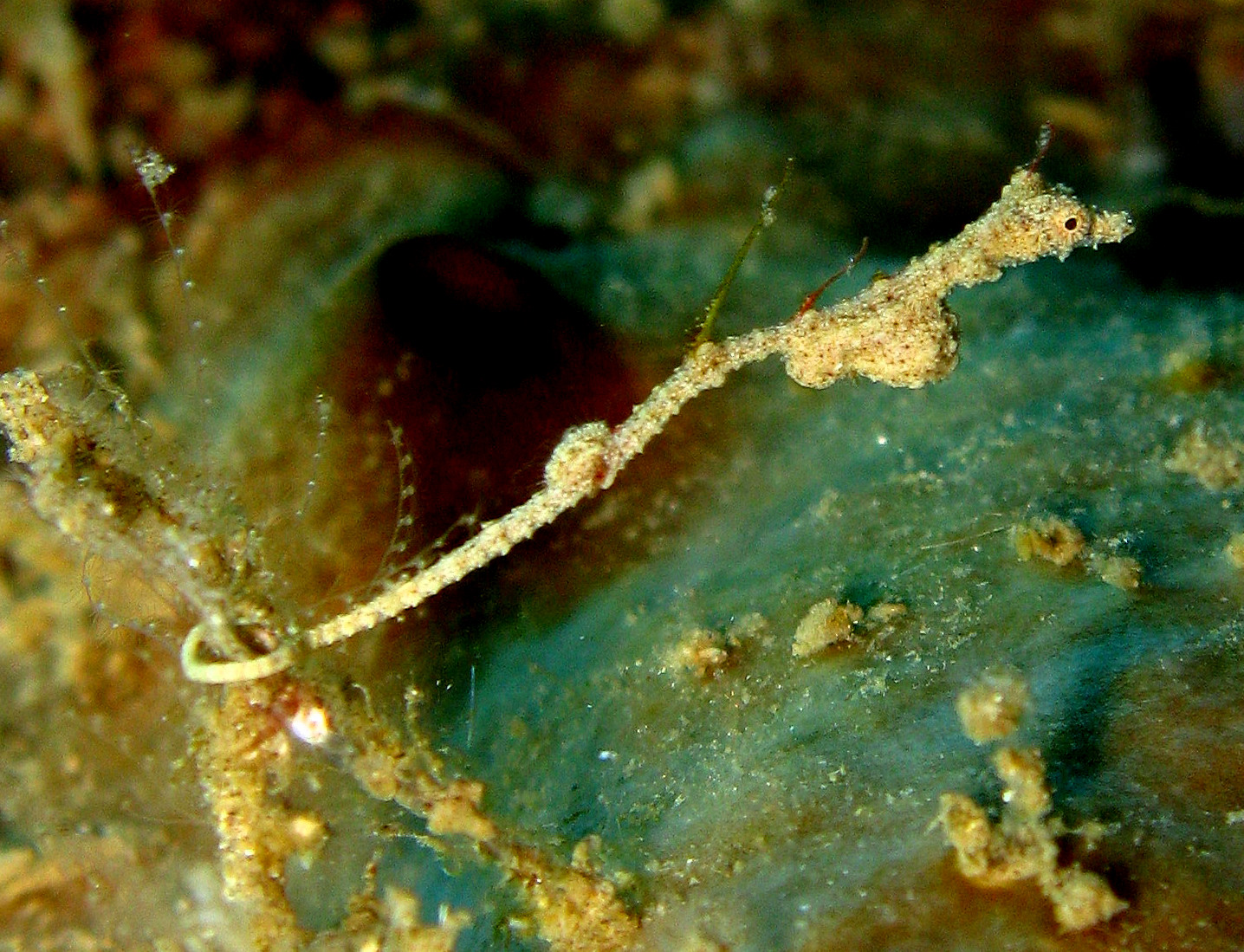

Conservation status
- Least Concern (IUCN 3.1)

Scientific classification
- Kingdom: Animalia
- Phylum: Chordata
- Class: Actinopterygii
- Division: Teleostei
- Order: Syngnathiformes
- Family: Syngnathidae
- Subfamily: Syngnathinae
- Genus: Kyonemichthys
- Species: K. rumengani

Binomial name
- Kyonemichthys rumengani M. F. Gomon, 2007

= Kyonemichthys =

Species of fish

The thread pipefish (Kyonemichthys rumengani), also known by its Japanese standard name Hari-youji, is a species of pipefish native to the Pacific Ocean around Indonesia, where it is found at depths from 15 to 20 m (49 to 66 ft). This species grows to a length of 2.68 cm (1.06 in), and is the only known member of its genus.

== Taxonomy and systematics ==
Kyonemichthys rumengani was originally described in 2007 based on an adult female specimen collected in the Lembeh Strait, Sulawesi. Originally it was thought to be related to the pygmy pipehorse genera Acentronura & Idiotropiscis based on morphological similarities, but mitochondrial genetic analyses have found that Kyonemichthys is instead a sister taxon to Urocampus, forming a clade which excludes the phylogenetically distant Acentronura, Idiotropiscis, and Siokunichthys.

== Distribution and habitat ==
First discovered in Indonesia, Kyonemichthys rumengani appears to be widespread throughout the Indo-Pacific. It has been recorded in the Red Sea off Egypt, the Ryukyu Islands, the Philippines, Fiji, the Mariana Islands & Papua New Guinea. It is found in mixed habitats on shallow coastal reefs & has been observed orienting itself by using bryozoans, hydroids & debris as holdfasts.
