= Nannocampus elegans =

Conservation status
- Least Concern (IUCN 3.1)

Scientific classification
- Kingdom: Animalia
- Phylum: Chordata
- Class: Actinopterygii
- Order: Syngnathiformes
- Family: Syngnathidae
- Genus: Nannocampus
- Species: N. elegans

Binomial name
- Nannocampus elegans J. L. B. Smith, 1953

Species of fish

Nannocampus elegans, the elegant pipefish, is a species of pipefish native to the Western Indian Ocean.

== See also ==
- List of marine spiny-finned fishes of South Africa
