= Urocampus carinirostris =

Hairy pipefish

Conservation status
- Least Concern (IUCN 3.1)

Scientific classification
- Kingdom: Animalia
- Phylum: Chordata
- Class: Actinopterygii
- Division: Teleostei
- Order: Syngnathiformes
- Family: Syngnathidae
- Genus: Urocampus
- Species: U. carinirostris

Binomial name
- Urocampus carinirostris Castelnau 1872

Species of fish

Urocampus carinirostris, also known as the hairy pipefish, is a species of marine fish belonging to the family Syngnathidae. They can be found inhabiting shallow seagrass beds and estuaries in Papua New Guinea and along the southern coast of Australia from Queensland to Swan River, Western Australia. Urocampus carinirostris is an ambush predator that is most commonly found on the edges of protected seagrass beds and near mangrove. Its diet consists of copepods and other small crustaceans. Reproduction occurs through ovoviviparity in which males brood around 48 eggs in a pouch beneath their tail before giving live birth to fully formed offspring. Adults can breed for at least six months.
