= Pseudophallus elcapitanensis =

Conservation status
- Least Concern (IUCN 3.1)

Scientific classification
- Kingdom: Animalia
- Phylum: Chordata
- Class: Actinopterygii
- Order: Syngnathiformes
- Family: Syngnathidae
- Genus: Pseudophallus
- Species: P. elcapitanensis

Binomial name
- Pseudophallus elcapitanensis Meek & Hildebrand 1914

Species of fish

Pseudophallus elcapitanensis is a species of marine fish belonging to the family Syngnathidae. They can be found within freshwater rivers and streams in Central America from Jimenez, Costa Rica to Rio Chico, Panama.
