= Penetopteryx nanus =

Worm pipefish

Conservation status
- Least Concern (IUCN 3.1)

Scientific classification
- Domain: Eukaryota
- Kingdom: Animalia
- Phylum: Chordata
- Class: Actinopterygii
- Order: Syngnathiformes
- Family: Syngnathidae
- Genus: Penetopteryx
- Species: P. nanus

Binomial name
- Penetopteryx nanus Rosén 1911

Species of fish

Penetopteryx nanus, also known as the worm pipefish, is a species of marine fish belonging to the family Syngnathidae. The species can be found in shallow water coral rubble and macroalgae habitats in the Western Atlantic from Providencia Island, Colombia, to the Bahamas and Belize. Reproduction occurs through ovoviviparity in which the males brood eggs before giving live birth. Penetopteryx nanus are typically 3-6 millimeters when born and can reach up to recorded lengths of 3.17 centimeters in adulthood. In their larval state, Penetopteryx nanus have well-developed fins, but these are lost in adulthood.
