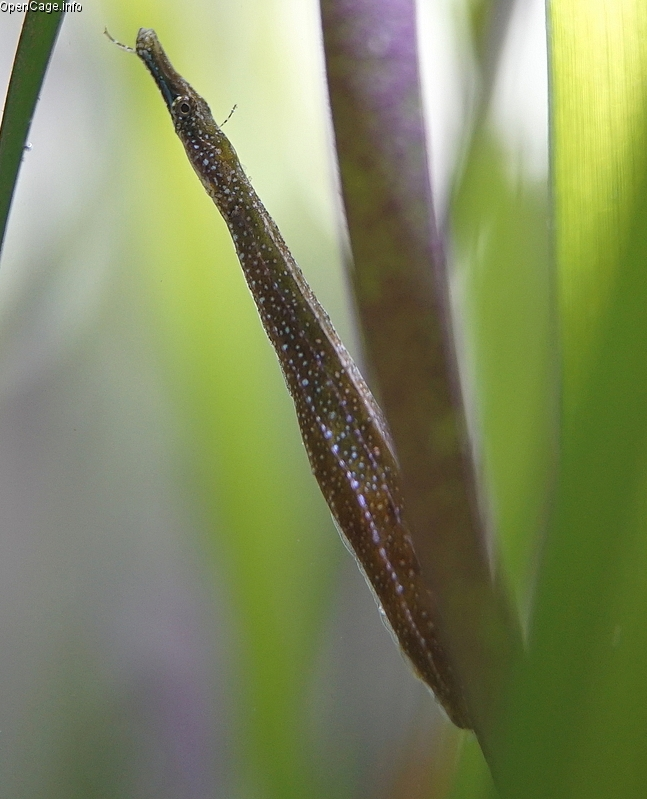
- Urocampus nanus

Conservation status
- Least Concern (IUCN 3.1)

Scientific classification
- Kingdom: Animalia
- Phylum: Chordata
- Class: Actinopterygii
- Division: Teleostei
- Order: Syngnathiformes
- Family: Syngnathidae
- Genus: Urocampus
- Species: U. nanus

Binomial name
- Urocampus nanus Günther 1870

= Urocampus nanus =

Barbed pipefish

Species of fish

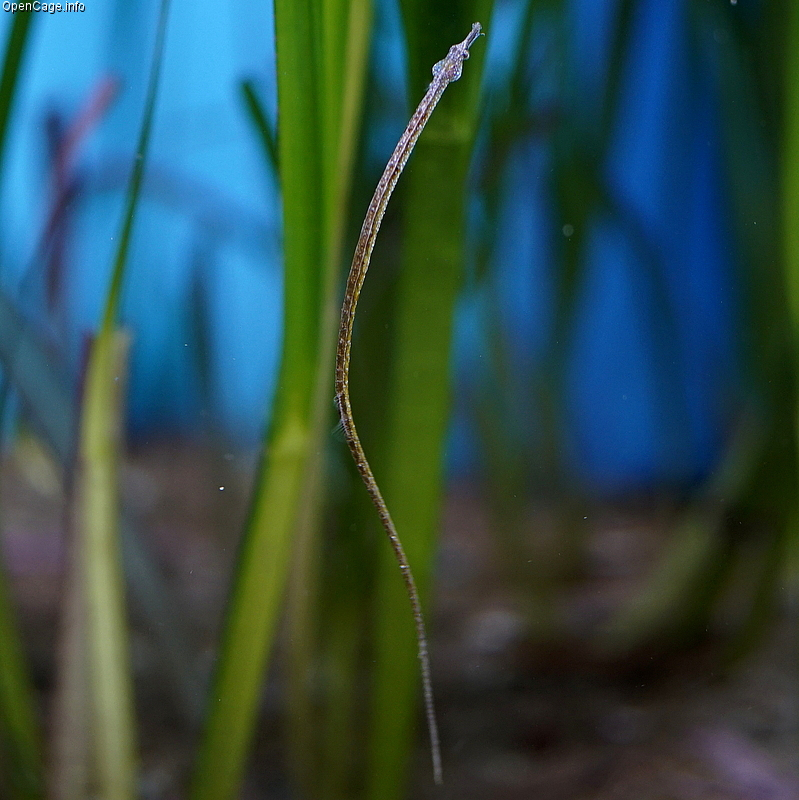
Urocampus nanus vertical view.

Urocampus nanus, commonly known as the barbed pipefish, is a species of marine fish belonging to the family Syngnathidae. This family consists of 56 different genera and 320 species.

== Description ==
This species, along with others in its family, have elongated bodies and appear wormlike. They have small mouths, and tube-snouts, that's length and width is determined by the prey they consume. Like other species in this family, male Urocampus nanus become pregnant. Additionally, these fish have a single dorsal and caudal fin, pectoral fins, a small anal fin, small gill openings, and lack pelvic fins.

Newborn barbed pipefish hatch with their dorsal fins, caudal fin rays, and body and tail rings formed. At this stage of life, the pectoral fin rays have yet to develop.

Members of this species exhibit sexual dimorphism. Females will have a blue spot on the side of their heads and along their bodies. Also, females have deeper bodies with a ventral fold. Males Urocampus nanus lack these characteristics.

Pipefish as a whole and Urocampus nanus are typically poor swimmers. They are typically slow moving and appear almost stationary. For locomotion, the barbed pipefish relies on quick movements from their dorsal and pectoral fins, which gives them a good amount of body control.

== Distribution ==
Generally, species in the family Syngnathidae are located in the Pacific, Indian, and Atlantic oceans in temperate to tropical waters. Urocampus nanus is reported to be distributed in the eelgrass or seagrass meadows in the Northwest Pacific Ocean. They have been found around the coast of Japan, the southern end of the Korean Peninsula, and the northeastern coast of China. The species can be found inhabiting seagrass beds in sheltered shoreline and estuary habitats.

== Feeding and diet ==
Their diet likely consists of small crustaceans because members of the Syngnathidae family primarily consume small crustaceans; different arthropods and copepods are also dominant sources of food. Pipefish specifically are known to consume copepods as well as other organisms like amphipods, decapods, and mysids.

Organisms in this family, including Urocampus nanus, show clear stages in feeding. Overall, pipefish are some of the fastest feeders of all fish and use a method similar to suction feeding. This process begins with the search for prey. If the fish is attached to a holdfast, it acts as sit-and-wait predators; if it is free in the water, it will actively hunt their prey. Pipefish will orient their mouths close enough to the prey so they do not have to pivot their whole body. When they are ready to strike, the fish rapidly rotates its head to be able to snap its mouths toward the prey and consume them through suction. Comparatively, the speed of this attack is faster than a copepods reaction time. The head rotation and muscle activation used by pipefish during this hunting is similar to the movement of chameleon, frog, and salamander tongues.

== Reproduction ==
Urocampus nanus reproduction is similar to other organisms in the same family. Generally, the female will deposit eggs into the male's brooding pouch or on their ventral surface. The males will then protect and nourish the eggs until they hatch. Males brood eggs for 11–16 days before giving live birth, making the barbed pipefish ovoviviparous.

There are six stages in mating for this species: lateral display, rising up, holding, parallel swim, copulation, and wiggling. In lateral display, one fish bends its body and pushes toward the other fish it wishes to mate with. Then, during rising up, the pair releases from a holdfast whole keeping a vertical orientation. During the holding stage, the couple will wind their tails together. Urocampus nanus then moves into the parallel swim stage, where the fish swim parallel while remaining intertwined. Spawning or copulation occurs when the two stop swimming, put their genitals together, and the female extrudes eggs to be accepted by the male. Finally, in wiggling, the male will twist back into a vertical position after accepting the female's eggs.

Females will ovulate multiple times before reproducing, so egg production is considered discontinuous. Urocampus nanus is thought to be polyandrous, where multiple females compete over breeding with a single male. Because female barbed pipefish will mate with multiple males, they are the predominant competitor for mates.

== Threats and conservation ==
Urocampus nanus is currently threatened by the loss of seagrass habitats as a result of natural and anthropogenic disturbances. Some anthropogenic causes include pollution, coastal development, and algae aquaculture production. While no studies have been done to quantify this habitat loss, the species population is predicted to decline if seagrass habitats continue to be lost.

If these disturbances continue over a long period of time, it could lead to an overall loss of seagrass habitats in the Northwest Pacific. As a result of major habitat loss, there would be negative effects on both species diversity and abundance. Currently there are efforts to restore harmed ecosystems through replanting; however; areas of restoration and greater ecosystem consequences have yet to be described.

== Uses ==
It is not known what this species is used for specifically, however, it is most likely similar to that of other members of the Syngnathidae. Organisms in this family are used in aquariums, traditional medicine, and for ornamental purposes.
