= Phoxocampus tetrophthalmus =

Trunk-barred pipefish

Conservation status
- Least Concern (IUCN 3.1)

Scientific classification
- Kingdom: Animalia
- Phylum: Chordata
- Class: Actinopterygii
- Order: Syngnathiformes
- Family: Syngnathidae
- Genus: Phoxocampus
- Species: P. tetrophthalmus

Binomial name
- Phoxocampus tetrophthalmus Bleeker 1858

Species of fish

Phoxocampus tetrophthalmus, the trunk-barred pipefish, is a species of marine fish belonging to the family Syngnathidae. This species can be found in reefs and tide pools of the Indo-Pacific specifically Indonesia, the Philippines, and Guam. They have also been observed in the Andaman, Cocos-Keeling, and Ryukyu islands. Their diet likely consists of small crustaceans Reproduction occurs through ovoviviparity in which the males brood eggs before giving live birth.
