= Ichthyocampus carce =

Conservation status
- Least Concern (IUCN 3.1)

Scientific classification
- Kingdom: Animalia
- Phylum: Chordata
- Class: Actinopterygii
- Order: Syngnathiformes
- Family: Syngnathidae
- Genus: Ichthyocampus
- Species: I. carce

Binomial name
- Ichthyocampus carce Hamilton 1822

Species of fish

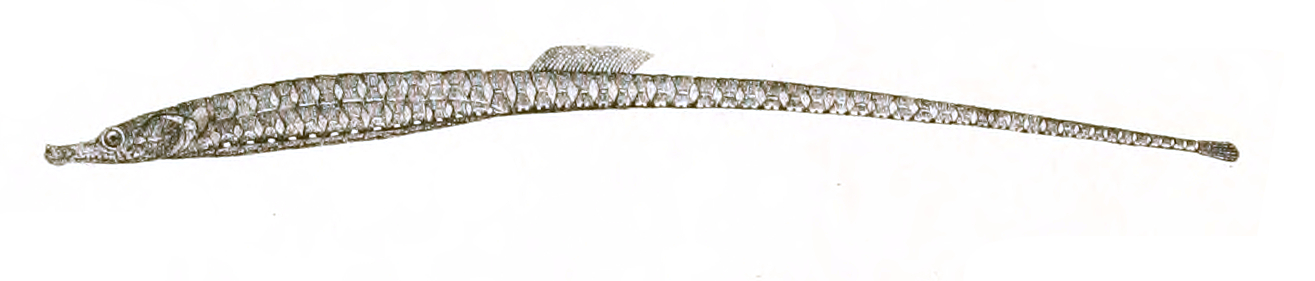
Ichthyocampus carce

Ichthyocampus carce, also known as the freshwater pipefish or Indian freshwater pipefish, is a species of marine fish in the family Syngnathidae. It can be found mainly in freshwater streams, rivers, and estuaries located in the Indian Ocean and the western Pacific, from Indonesia to the western coast of India. It can live in both inland and coastal waters. This species can grow to a length of 15cm and feeds primarily on small invertebrates and zooplankton. Reproduction occurs through ovoviviparity, in which the males carry eggs in a brood pouch before giving live birth. Males of this species can brood roughly 280 offspring at a time.
