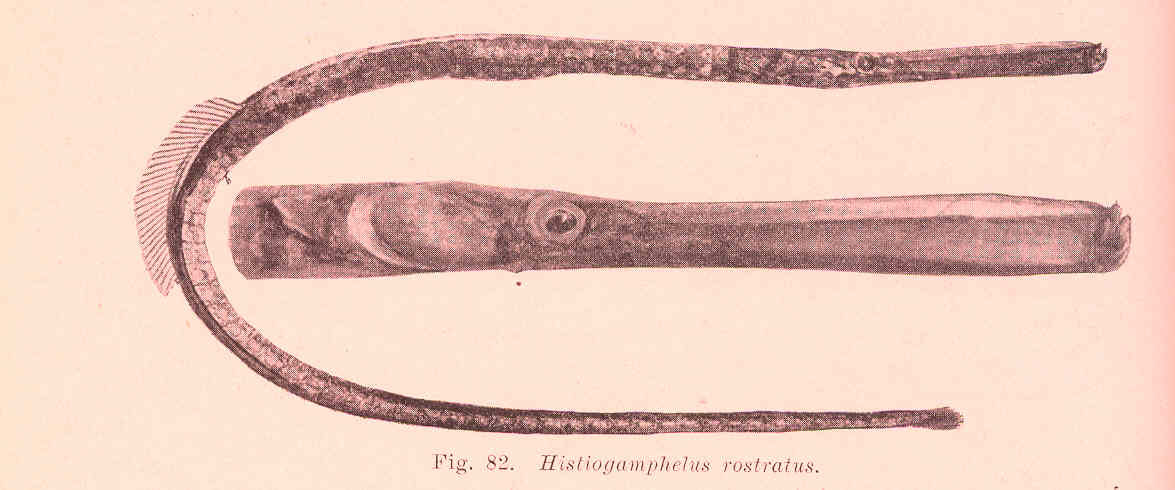
- Engraving depicting Histiogamphelus Rostratus

Conservation status
- Least Concern (IUCN 3.1)

Scientific classification
- Kingdom: Animalia
- Phylum: Chordata
- Class: Actinopterygii
- Division: Teleostei
- Order: Syngnathiformes
- Family: Syngnathidae
- Genus: Hypselognathus
- Species: H. rostratus

Binomial name
- Hypselognathus rostratus Waite & Hale 1921

= Hypselognathus rostratus =

Knife-snouted pipefish

Species of fish

Hypselognathus rostratus, also known as the knife-snouted pipefish, is a species of marine fish belonging to the family Syngnathidae. This species can be found in very shallow coastal waters of southeastern Australia. Their habitat consists of sandy substrates, seagrass beds, and estuaries. Reproduction occurs through ovoviviparity in which the males brood eggs before giving live birth.
