= Nannocampus weberi =

Reef-flat pipefish

Conservation status
- Data Deficient (IUCN 3.1)

Scientific classification
- Kingdom: Animalia
- Phylum: Chordata
- Class: Actinopterygii
- Order: Syngnathiformes
- Family: Syngnathidae
- Genus: Nannocampus
- Species: N. weberi

Binomial name
- Nannocampus weberi Duncker 1915

Species of fish

Nannocampus weberi, also known as the reef-flat pipefish, is a species of marine fish belonging to the family Syngnathidae. They can be found inhabiting reefs in the Lesser Sunda Islands of Indonesia particularly the islands of Sumba and Bali. Their diet likely consists of small crustaceans such as copepods. Reproduction occurs through ovoviviparity in which the males brood eggs before giving live birth.
