= Nannocampus pictus =

Reef pipefish

Conservation status
- Least Concern (IUCN 3.1)

Scientific classification
- Kingdom: Animalia
- Phylum: Chordata
- Class: Actinopterygii
- Order: Syngnathiformes
- Family: Syngnathidae
- Genus: Nannocampus
- Species: N. pictus

Binomial name
- Nannocampus pictus Duncker 1915

Species of fish

Nannocampus pictus, also known as the reef pipefish, is a species of marine fish belonging to the family Syngnathidae. They can be found inhabiting reefs and seagrass beds of the western Indian Ocean and the eastern coast of Australia including the Great Barrier Reef. Members of this species can grow to lengths of 10 cm and their diet likely consists of small crustaceans such as copepods. Reproduction occurs through ovoviviparity in which the males brood eggs before giving live birth.
