= Phoxocampus belcheri =

Rock pipefish

Conservation status
- Least Concern (IUCN 3.1)

Scientific classification
- Domain: Eukaryota
- Kingdom: Animalia
- Phylum: Chordata
- Class: Actinopterygii
- Order: Syngnathiformes
- Family: Syngnathidae
- Genus: Phoxocampus
- Species: P. belcheri

Binomial name
- Phoxocampus belcheri Kaup 1856

Species of fish

Phoxocampus belcheri, also known as the rock pipefish, is a species of marine fish belonging to the family Syngnathidae. The species can be found in shallow reefs and tide pools throughout much of the Indo-Pacific ranging from the eastern coast of Africa and the Red Sea to Tonga and Japan. Its diet likely consists of small crustaceans such as copepods. Reproduction occurs through ovoviviparity in which the males brood eggs before giving live birth.
