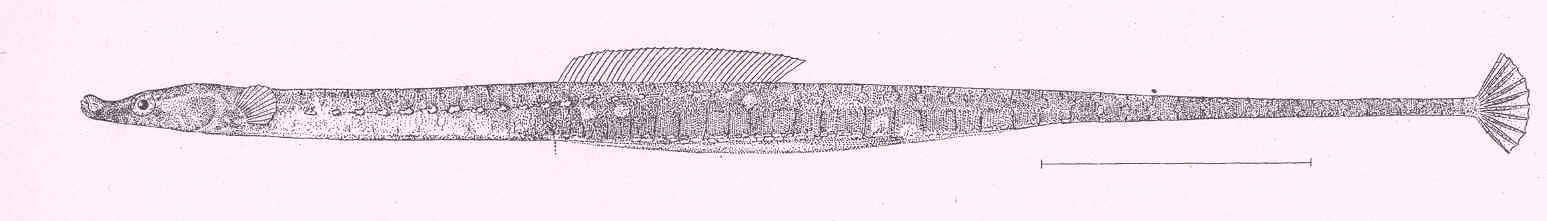

Conservation status
- Least Concern (IUCN 3.1)

Scientific classification
- Kingdom: Animalia
- Phylum: Chordata
- Class: Actinopterygii
- Order: Syngnathiformes
- Family: Syngnathidae
- Genus: Pseudophallus
- Species: P. starksii

Binomial name
- Pseudophallus starksii Jordan & Culver 1895

= Pseudophallus starksii =

Yellowbelly pipefish

Species of fish

Pseudophallus starksii, also known as the yellowbelly pipefish, is a species of marine fish belonging to the family Syngnathidae. They can be found in freshwater streams, rivers, and estuaries ranging from the west coast of Baja California to Ecuador. Reproduction occurs through ovoviviparity in which the males brood eggs before giving live birth.
