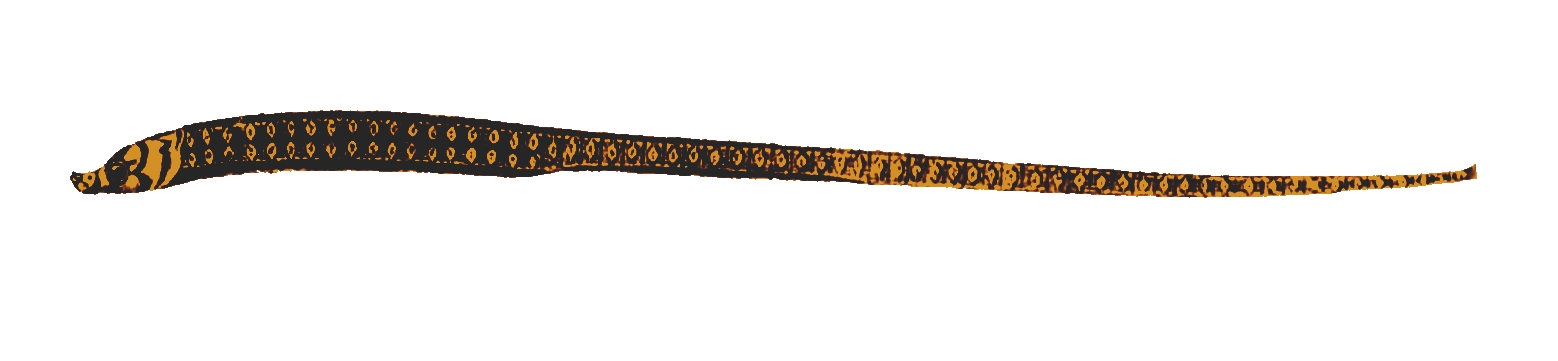

Conservation status
- Least Concern (IUCN 3.1)

Scientific classification
- Kingdom: Animalia
- Phylum: Chordata
- Class: Actinopterygii
- Division: Teleostei
- Order: Syngnathiformes
- Family: Syngnathidae
- Genus: Penetopteryx
- Species: P. taeniocephalus

Binomial name
- Penetopteryx taeniocephalus Lunel 1881

= Penetopteryx taeniocephalus =

Oceanic pipefish

Species of fish

Penetopteryx taeniocephalus, also known as the oceanic pipefish, is a species of marine fish belonging to the family Syngnathidae. The species can be found inhabiting coral rubble and gravel in many areas of the Indo-Pacific including Madagascar, Mauritius, the Philippines, Indonesia, and Vanuatu. Its diet likely consists of small crustaceans such as copepods. Reproduction occurs through ovoviviparity in which the males brood eggs before giving live birth.
