= Nannocampus subosseus =

Bony-headed pipefish

Conservation status
- Least Concern (IUCN 3.1)

Scientific classification
- Kingdom: Animalia
- Phylum: Chordata
- Class: Actinopterygii
- Division: Teleostei
- Order: Syngnathiformes
- Family: Syngnathidae
- Genus: Nannocampus
- Species: N. subosseus

Binomial name
- Nannocampus subosseus Günther 1870

Species of pipefish

Nannocampus subosseus, also known as the bony-headed pipefish, is a species of marine fish belonging to the family Syngnathidae. They can be found inhabiting reefs and tide pools only in the region of Shark Bay to Esperance, Western Australia. Members of this species can grow to lengths of 12 cm and their diet likely consists of small crustaceans such as copepods. Reproduction occurs through ovoviviparity in which the males brood eggs before giving live birth.
