= Hypselognathus horridus =

Conservation status
- Data Deficient (IUCN 3.1)

Scientific classification
- Kingdom: Animalia
- Phylum: Chordata
- Class: Actinopterygii
- Order: Syngnathiformes
- Family: Syngnathidae
- Genus: Hypselognathus
- Species: H. horridus

Binomial name
- Hypselognathus horridus Dawson & Glover 1982

Species of fish

Hypselognathus horridus, commonly known as the prickly pipefish or shaggy pipefish, is a species of marine fish belonging to the family Sygnathidae

H. horridus lives on the continental shelf in depths ranging from 40 to 55 m (131 to 180 ft). It is endemic to the Great Australian Bight, located in South Australia. Reproduction occurs through ovoviviparity in which the males brood eggs and give birth to live young.
