= Pseudophallus mindii =

Freshwater pipefish

Conservation status
- Data Deficient (IUCN 3.1)

Scientific classification
- Kingdom: Animalia
- Phylum: Chordata
- Class: Actinopterygii
- Division: Teleostei
- Order: Syngnathiformes
- Family: Syngnathidae
- Genus: Pseudophallus
- Species: P. mindii

Binomial name
- Pseudophallus mindii Meek & Hildebrand 1923

Species of fish

Pseudophallus mindii, also known as the freshwater pipefish, is a species of marine fish belonging to the family Syngnathidae. They can be found in freshwater coastal rivers and mangrove estuaries ranging from Belize to Brazil. Members of this species can grow to lengths of 16 cm and their diet likely consists of small crustaceans. Reproduction occurs through ovoviviparity in which the males brood eggs before giving live birth.
