= Phoxocampus diacanthus =

Obscure pipefish

Conservation status
- Least Concern (IUCN 3.1)

Scientific classification
- Kingdom: Animalia
- Phylum: Chordata
- Class: Actinopterygii
- Order: Syngnathiformes
- Family: Syngnathidae
- Genus: Phoxocampus
- Species: P. diacanthus

Binomial name
- Phoxocampus diacanthus Schultz 1943

Species of fish

Phoxocampus diacanthus, also known as the obscure pipefish or spined pipefish, is a species of marine fish belonging to the family Sygnathidae. It can be found inhabiting reefs throughout the Indo-Pacific from Japan and Sri Lanka to Samoa and New Caledonia in the south. Its diet likely consists of small crustaceans. Reproduction occurs through ovoviviparity in which the males brood eggs before giving live birth.
