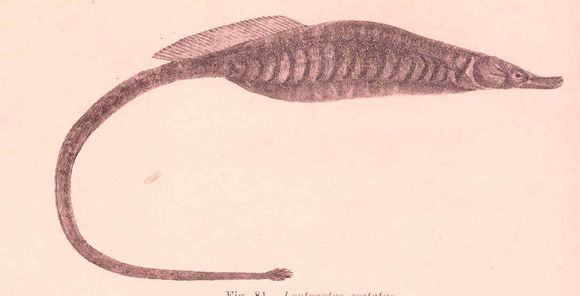

Conservation status
- Least Concern (IUCN 3.1)

Scientific classification
- Kingdom: Animalia
- Phylum: Chordata
- Class: Actinopterygii
- Division: Teleostei
- Order: Syngnathiformes
- Family: Syngnathidae
- Subfamily: Syngnathinae
- Genus: Kaupus; Whitley, 1951
- Species: K. costatus

Binomial name
- Kaupus costatus (Waite & Hale, 1921)

Synonyms
- Leptonotus costatus Waite & Hale, 1921

= Kaupus =

Species of fish

The deepbody pipefish (Kaupus costatus) is a species of pipefish endemic to Australia where it is only found along the southern coast. This species grows to a length of 12.9 centimetres (5.1 in) SL. This species is the only known member of the monotypic genus Kaupus which is named in honour of the ichthyologist Johann Jakob Kaup (1803-1873).

== Description ==
The deep body pipefish has a very elongated body with the main part of the body being laterally flattened in adult females, being much deeper than the male's bodies. The head is in line with the body and the snout is of moderate length, comprising 32-40% of the length of the head and having a depth of 32-56% of its length. There is a ridge along the middle of the snout which merges with the supraorbital ridges< The ridges on the opercules are straight and cross at least half the opercules in subadults and adults. The upper ridge on the trunk and the tail break near the base of the dorsal fin, the lower trunk and tail ridges are continuous while the flank ridge on the trunk is not confluent with the tail ridges. The tail is not prehensile. The dorsal fin is situated nearer to the head than to tip of tail and has a moderately long base. The anal fin is very small and is located below the posterior half of dorsal fin, the caudal fin is small and rounded and a pectoral fin is present.

The meristics are that the dorsal fin has 30-36 soft rays, the anal fin has 3-4, the pectoral fin has 9-11 and the caudal fin has 7-10, although this is normally 9-10. The body has 16-18 rings on the trunk and the tail has 35-38. The fish is red or reddish-brown in colour with very small blue, yellow or white spots on the back with undulating, fine markings of the same colours on the head and tail. The adult males and the subadults occasionally have a narrow, blackish, midlateral stripe on the part of tail near the body. The adult females have bluish streaks, lines and small spots above their lateral trunk ridge, and with an obvious blue patch on each trunk ring below the line of the lateral ridge.

== Distribution ==
Kaupus costatus is endemic to the coastal waters of southern Australia and occurs in Victoria and South Australia, and off Tasmania, the Bass Strait and the Great Australian Bight.

== Habitat and biology ==
Kaupus costatus occur among seagrass and algal beds, in mangroves, and in estuaries. to depths of 0–50 metres (0–164 ft). It prefers silty environments but these have to have relatively clear water. Its dietary habits are little known but it is food is thought to consist of small planktonic and possibly benthic crustaceans as in other Australian pipefishes. This species is ovoviviparous and the males brood the fertilised eggs beneath their tail before giving live birth to the fry. The size of broods is relatively small, with 3 to 25 eggs in each brood, and the newly hatched larvae have a length of 15 millimetres (0.59 in).

== Conservation ==
Kaupus costatus is a listed marine species under the Australian Environment Protection and Biodiversity Conservation Act 1999, it is also protected in all the states in which it occurs by local fisheries management acts. The preferred habitat of this species are undisturbed beds of sea grass, especially Zostera beds, and the decline of these beds is a threat to this species.
