= Mitotichthys =

Scientific classification
- Domain: Eukaryota
- Kingdom: Animalia
- Phylum: Chordata
- Class: Actinopterygii
- Order: Syngnathiformes
- Family: Syngnathidae
- Subfamily: Syngnathinae
- Genus: Mitotichthys; Whitley, 1948

Type species
- Syngnathus tuckeri Scott, 1942

Genus of fishes

Mitotichthys is a genus of pipefishes native to the waters around Australia, with these currently recognized species:

- Mitotichthys meraculus (Whitley, 1948) (western crested pipefish)
- Mitotichthys mollisoni (E. O. G. Scott, 1955) (Mollison's pipefish)
- Mitotichthys semistriatus (Kaup, 1856) (half-banded pipefish)
- Mitotichthys tuckeri (E. O. G. Scott, 1942) (Tucker's pipefish)
