= Ichthyocampus =

Scientific classification
- Kingdom: Animalia
- Phylum: Chordata
- Class: Actinopterygii
- Order: Syngnathiformes
- Family: Syngnathidae
- Subfamily: Syngnathinae
- Genus: Ichthyocampus; Kaup, 1853

Type species
- Syngnathus carce Hamilton, 1822

Genus of fishes

Ichthyocampus is a genus of pipefishes found in the Indian and Pacific Oceans.

== Species ==
There are currently two recognized species in this genus:

- Ichthyocampus bikiniensis Herald, 1953
- Ichthyocampus carce (F. Hamilton, 1822)
