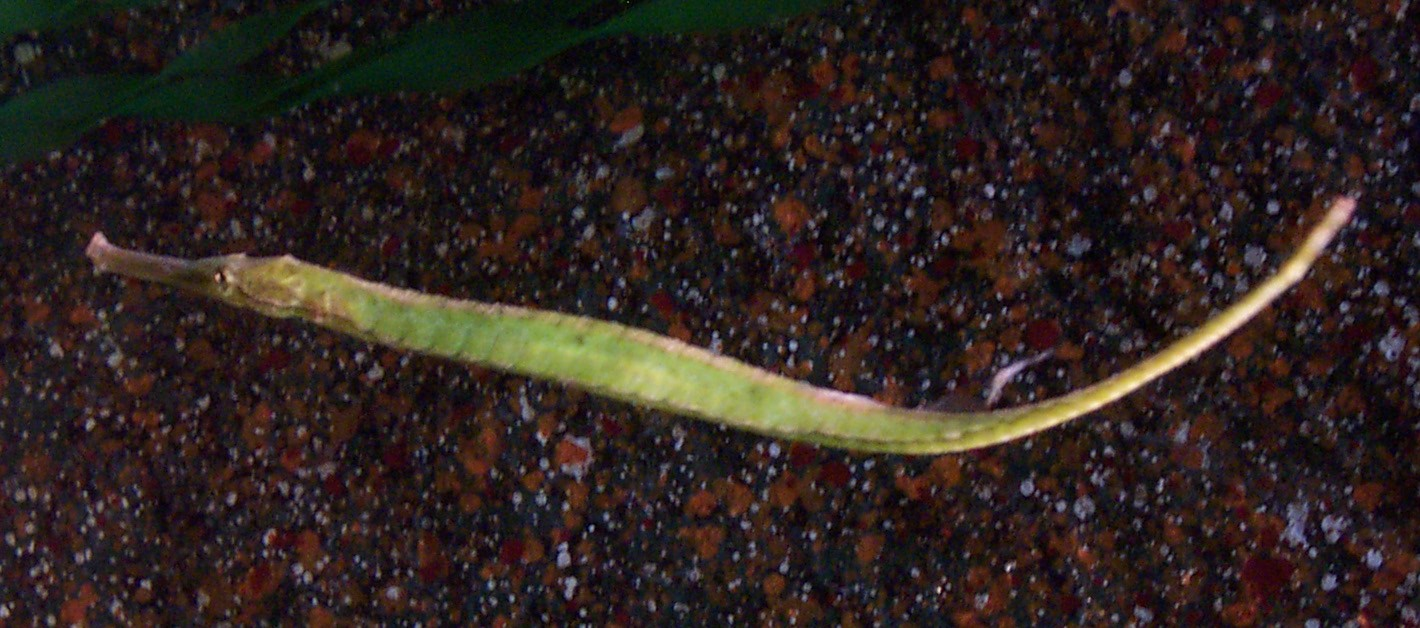

Conservation status
- Least Concern (IUCN 3.1)

Scientific classification
- Kingdom: Animalia
- Phylum: Chordata
- Class: Actinopterygii
- Order: Syngnathiformes
- Family: Syngnathidae
- Subfamily: Syngnathinae
- Genus: Syngnathoides; Bleeker, 1851
- Species: S. biaculeatus

Binomial name
- Syngnathoides biaculeatus (Bloch, 1785)

Synonyms
- Stigmatophora unicolor Castelnau, 1875; Syngnathoides bicauleatus (Bloch, 1785); Syngnathoides biculeatus (Bloch, 1785); Syngnathoides blochii Bleeker, 1851; Syngnathus biaculeatus Bloch, 1785; Syngnathus tetragonus Thunberg, 1776

= Alligator pipefish =

Species of fish

The alligator pipefish or double-ended pipefish (Syngnathoides biaculeatus) is a species of fish in the family Syngnathidae and is the only species in the monotypic genus Syngnathoides. It is found in shallow water in the tropical and subtropical Indo-Pacific, its range extending from East Africa to northern Australia. This fish lives in habitats of seagrass and seaweed, and hides by positioning itself vertically with its head down amidst the similar-coloured fronds of vegetation. The elongated, well-camouflaged body can reach 29 cm (11 in) in length. It feeds by sucking up its prey.

== Description ==
The alligator pipefish can grow to a length of about 29 cm (11 in) though a more typical length is 20 cm (8 in). The narrow head has the snout tipped by a pair of short tentacles and the body is elongated and tetrahedral. The dorsal fin has 38 to 48 soft rays and the anal fins have 4 soft rays. The tail is long and tapering. It is prehensile and lacks a tail fin, being used to anchor the fish to vegetation. The colour of this fish tends to match its surroundings and is usually some shade of green, brown, or grey. Females are often blotched and may have a white zigzag line running along the abdomen.

== Distribution and habitat ==
The alligator pipefish occurs in tropical and subtropical parts of the Indian Ocean and Pacific Ocean. Its range extends from South Africa, the East Coast of Africa, and the Red Sea to India, Japan, Indonesia, the Philippines, New Guinea, Australia, and various Pacific Islands. In Australia its range extends from Geraldton in Western Australia around the coast of the Northern Territory and Queensland to Batemans Bay in New South Wales. It occurs in lagoons and on reef flats, in bays and estuaries, in seagrass meadows, and in floating masses of algae, usually at depths of less than 5 m (16 ft).

== Behaviour ==
The alligator pipefish is an inefficient swimmer, moving by an undulating motion of its pectoral and dorsal fins. It feeds on zooplankton and small creatures which it sucks into its mouth. The diet includes amphipods, mysids, shrimps, other benthic invertebrates, and small fish.

The alligator pipefish is sexually dimorphic with males being larger than females. Males become mature at a length of about 180 mm (7 in). Breeding takes place during the summer in Moreton Bay, Queensland but occurs at any time of year in Papua New Guinea. A female produces a batch of 60 to 200 eggs which are retained by the male in a brood pouch on his abdomen. Here they remain until they hatch. The male and female seem to have a monogamous relationship with all the developing eggs being at the same stage of development and presumably the product of a single female.

== Status ==
The alligator pipefish is dried and used in traditional Chinese medicine when it is known as "hailong". This fish appears in the pet trade for sale to home aquarium owners and is also kept and reared in public aquariums. No studies on the population trend for this species have been done and the International Union for Conservation of Nature does not know where the traded fish are acquired; it is unclear whether these are wild-caught fish, whether there are dedicated fisheries for this species, whether the fish are caught as bycatch or whether they are captive-reared. For these reasons, the IUCN considers it has insufficient information to assess the conservation status of this fish and has therefore listed it as being "data deficient". It is a listed marine species under the Australian Environment Protection and Biodiversity Conservation Act 1999.
