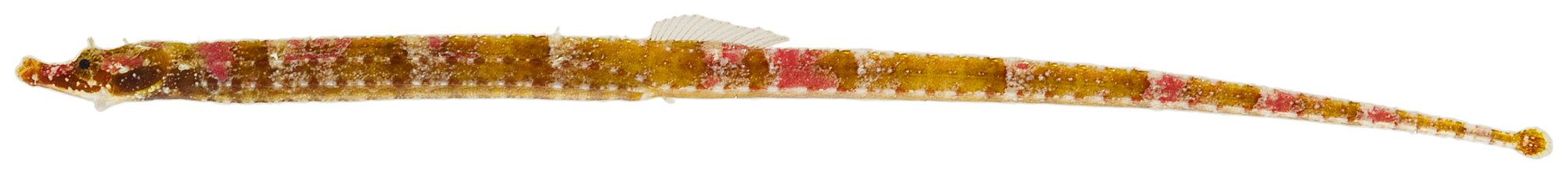
- Micrognathus crinitus

Scientific classification
- Kingdom: Animalia
- Phylum: Chordata
- Class: Actinopterygii
- Division: Teleostei
- Order: Syngnathiformes
- Family: Syngnathidae
- Subfamily: Syngnathinae
- Genus: Micrognathus; Duncker, 1912

Type species
- Syngnathus brevirostris Rüppell, 1838

= Micrognathus =

Genus of fishes

Micrognathus is a genus of pipefishes, with these currently recognized species:

- Micrognathus andersonii (Bleeker, 1858) (shortnose pipefish)
- Micrognathus brevicorpus R. Fricke, 2004
- Micrognathus brevirostris (Rüppell, 1838)
  - M. b. brevirostris (Rüppell, 1838) (thorntail pipefish)
- Micrognathus crinitus (Jenyns, 1842) (banded pipefish)
- Micrognathus erugatus Herald & C. E. Dawson, 1974
- Micrognathus micronotopterus (Fowler, 1938) (tidepool pipefish)
- Micrognathus natans C. E. Dawson, 1982 (offshore pipefish)
- Micrognathus pygmaeus Fritzsche, 1981
