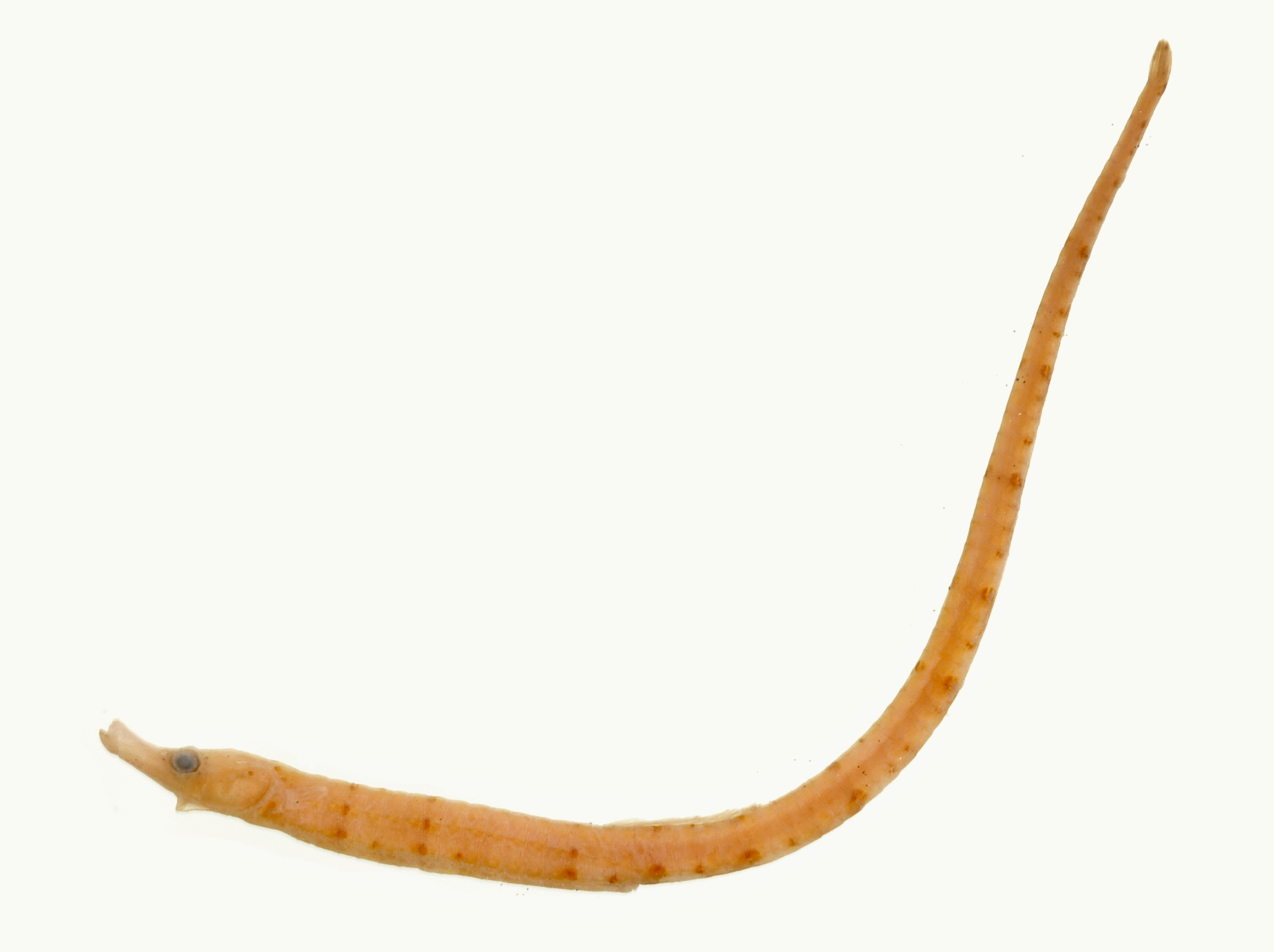
- Holotype

Conservation status
- Least Concern (IUCN 3.1)

Scientific classification
- Kingdom: Animalia
- Phylum: Chordata
- Class: Actinopterygii
- Order: Syngnathiformes
- Family: Syngnathidae
- Subfamily: Syngnathinae
- Genus: Kimblaeus; C. E. Dawson, 1980
- Species: K. bassensis

Binomial name
- Kimblaeus bassensis C. E. Dawson, 1980

= Trawl pipefish =

Species of fish

The trawl pipefish, Kimblaeus bassensis, is a species of pipefish found only in the Tasman Sea and the Bass Strait off of the southern coast of Australia, where it can be found at depths from 58 to 74 m (190 to 243 ft). This species grows to 16 cm (6.3 in) in standard length. This species is the only known member of its genus.
