= Hypselognathus =

Scientific classification
- Kingdom: Animalia
- Phylum: Chordata
- Class: Actinopterygii
- Order: Syngnathiformes
- Family: Syngnathidae
- Subfamily: Syngnathinae
- Genus: Hypselognathus; Whitley, 1948

Type species
- Histiogamphelus rostratus Waite & Hale, 1921

Genus of fishes

Hypselognathus is a genus of pipefishes endemic to Australia where they are only known from the southern coast.

== Species ==
There are currently two recognized species in this genus:

- Hypselognathus horridus C. E. Dawson & Glover, 1982 (prickly pipefish)
- Hypselognathus rostratus (Waite & Hale, 1921) (knife-snouted pipefish)
