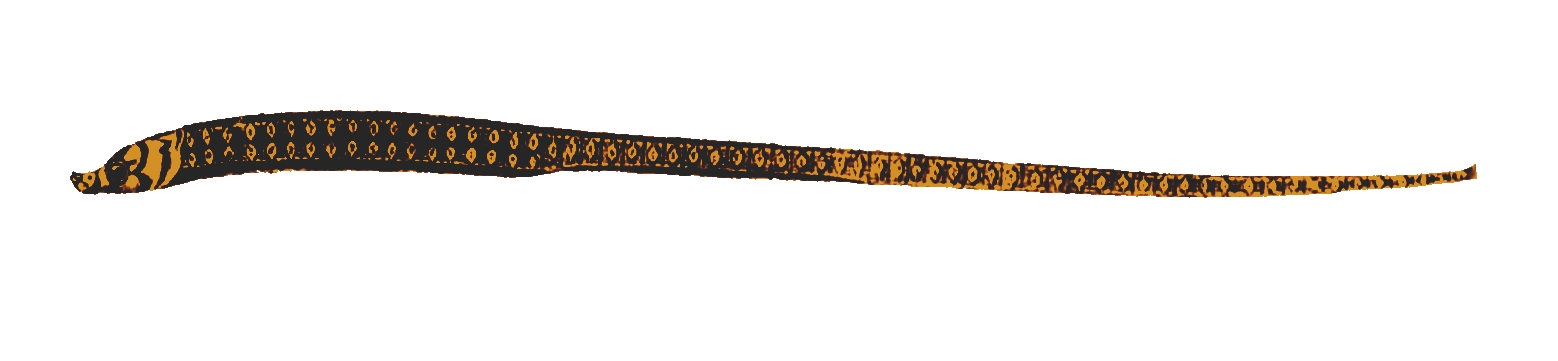
- Penetopteryx taeniocephalus

Scientific classification
- Kingdom: Animalia
- Phylum: Chordata
- Class: Actinopterygii
- Order: Syngnathiformes
- Family: Syngnathidae
- Subfamily: Syngnathinae
- Genus: Penetopteryx; Lunel, 1881

Type species
- Penetopteryx taeniocephalus Lunel, 1881

= Penetopteryx =

Genus of fishes

Penetopteryx is a genus of pipefishes.

== Species ==
There are currently two recognized species in this genus:

- Penetopteryx nanus (N. Rosén, 1911) (lost pipefish) Western Atlantic
- Penetopteryx taeniocephalus Lunel, 1881 Indo-Pacific,(Oceanic pipefish) Madagascar to Kiritimati In Kiribati.

Both species areclassified as being of Least Concern by the IUCN.
