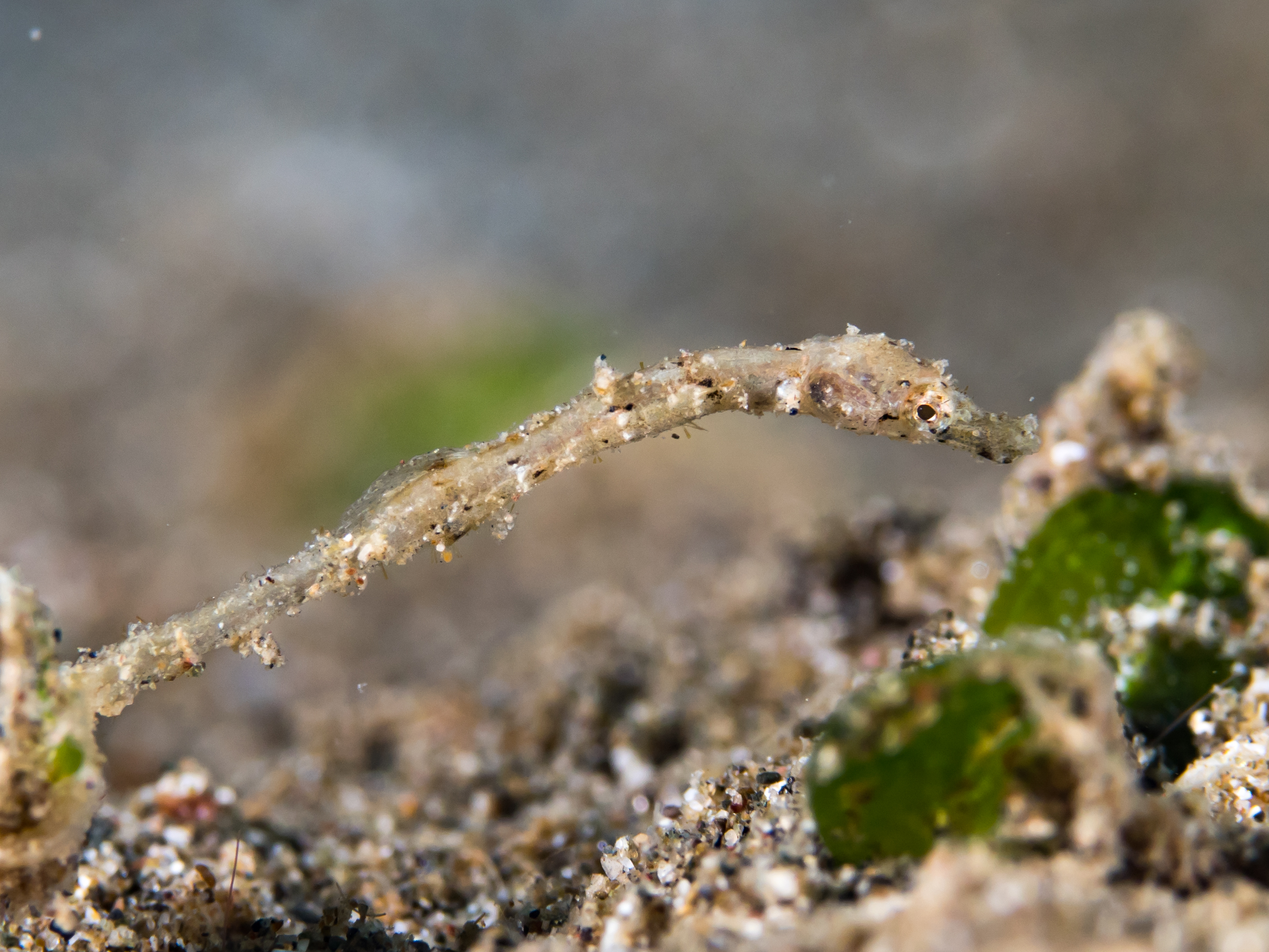

Conservation status
- Data Deficient (IUCN 3.1)

Scientific classification
- Kingdom: Animalia
- Phylum: Chordata
- Class: Actinopterygii
- Order: Syngnathiformes
- Family: Syngnathidae
- Subfamily: Syngnathinae
- Genus: Apterygocampus; M. C. W. Weber, 1913
- Species: A. epinnulatus

Binomial name
- Apterygocampus epinnulatus M. C. W. Weber, 1913

= Apterygocampus =

Species of fish

Apterygocampus epinnulatus is a species of pipefish native to the Pacific Ocean where it occurs around the countries of the Philippines, Indonesia and Papua New Guinea. This species grows to a length of 3 centimetres (1.2 in) SL. This species is the only known member of its genus.
