= Phoxocampus =

Scientific classification
- Kingdom: Animalia
- Phylum: Chordata
- Class: Actinopterygii
- Order: Syngnathiformes
- Family: Syngnathidae
- Subfamily: Syngnathinae
- Genus: Phoxocampus; C. E. Dawson, 1977

Type species
- Ichthyocampus belcheri Kaup, 1856

Genus of fishes

Phoxocampus is a genus of pipefishes native to the Indian and Pacific Oceans, with these currently recognized species:

- Phoxocampus belcheri (Kaup, 1856) (rock pipefish)
- Phoxocampus diacanthus (L. P. Schultz, 1943) (spined pipefish)
- Phoxocampus tetrophthalmus (Bleeker, 1858) (trunk-barred pipefish)
