= Nannocampus =

Scientific classification
- Kingdom: Animalia
- Phylum: Chordata
- Class: Actinopterygii
- Order: Syngnathiformes
- Family: Syngnathidae
- Subfamily: Syngnathinae
- Genus: Nannocampus; Günther, 1870

Type species
- Nannocampus subosseus Günther, 1870

Synonyms
- Mannarichthys Dawson, 1977

Genus of fishes

Nannocampus is a genus of pipefishes native to the Indian and Pacific Oceans with these currently recognized species:

- Nannocampus elegans J. L. B. Smith, 1953 (elegant pipefish)
- Nannocampus lindemanensis (Whitley, 1948) (painted pipefish)
- Nannocampus pictus (Duncker, 1915) (reef pipefish)
- Nannocampus subosseus Günther, 1870 (bony-headed pipefish)
- Nannocampus weberi Duncker, 1915 (reef-flat pipefish)
