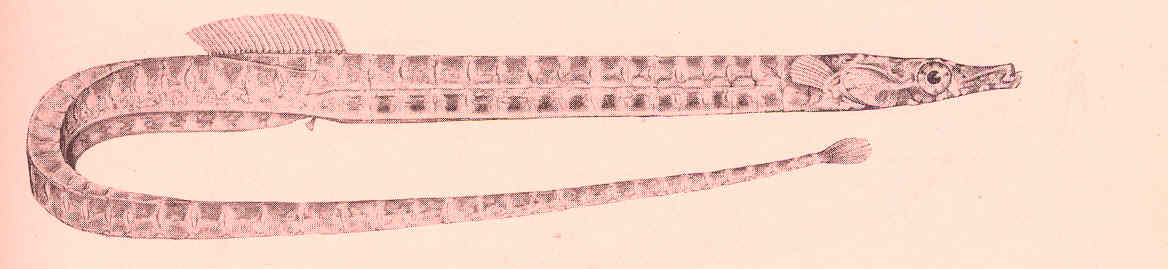

Conservation status
- Least Concern (IUCN 3.1)

Scientific classification
- Domain: Eukaryota
- Kingdom: Animalia
- Phylum: Chordata
- Class: Actinopterygii
- Order: Syngnathiformes
- Family: Syngnathidae
- Subfamily: Syngnathinae
- Genus: Pugnaso; Whitley, 1948
- Species: P. curtirostris

Binomial name
- Pugnaso curtirostris (Castelnau, 1872)

Synonyms
- Syngnathus curtirostris Castelnau, 1872; Syngnathus caretta Klunzinger, 1880

= Pugnaso =

Genus of fishes

Pugnaso curtirostris, the pug-nosed pipefish, is a species of pipefish endemic to the coastal waters of southern Australia. It is found down to a depth of about 11 metres (36 ft) in beds of seagrasses of the genera Posidonia and Zostera. This species grows to a length of 18.2 centimetres (7.2 in) SL. This species is the only known member of its genus.
