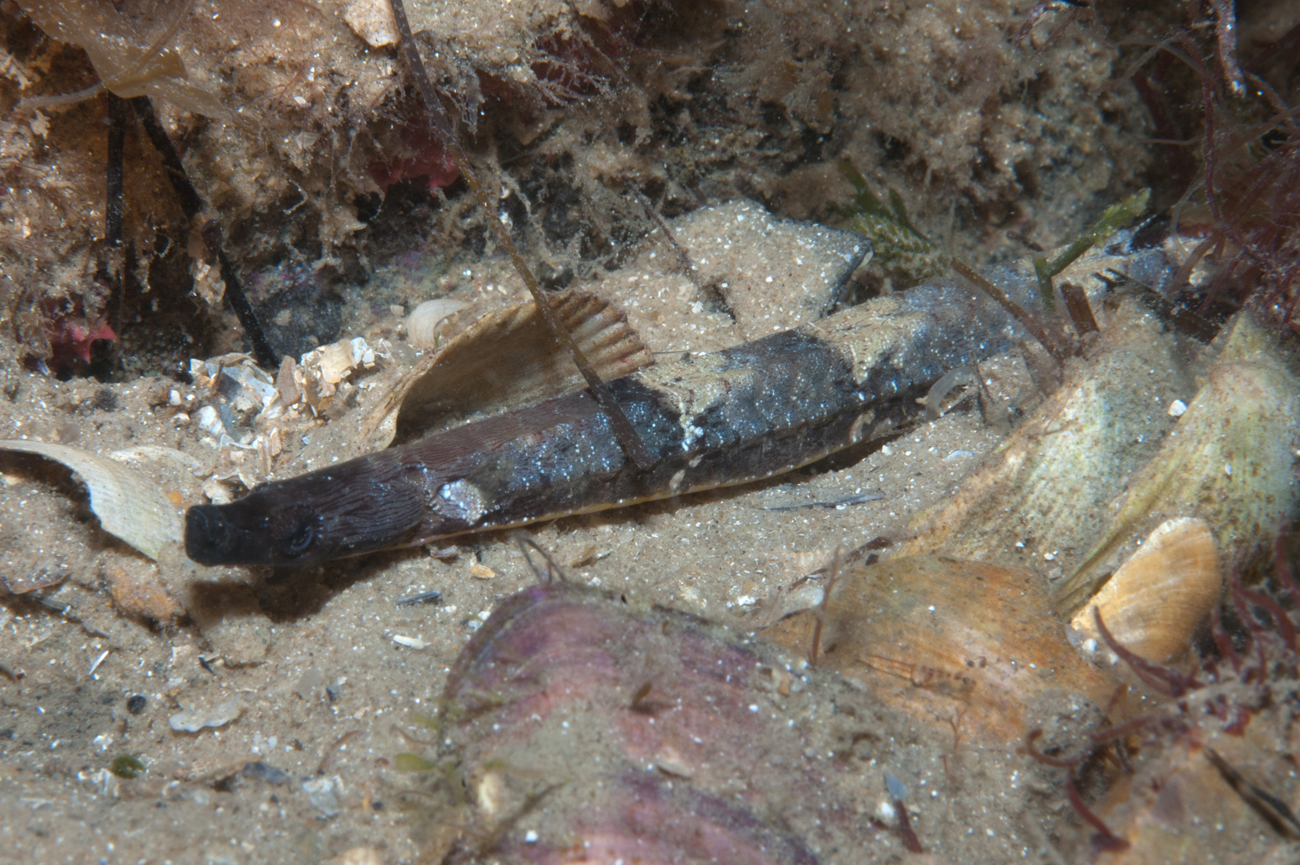

Conservation status
- Least Concern (IUCN 3.1)

Scientific classification
- Kingdom: Animalia
- Phylum: Chordata
- Class: Actinopterygii
- Division: Teleostei
- Order: Syngnathiformes
- Family: Syngnathidae
- Subfamily: Syngnathinae
- Genus: Stipecampus; Whitley, 1948
- Species: S. cristatus

Binomial name
- Stipecampus cristatus (McCulloch & Waite, 1918)

Synonyms
- Ichthyocampus cristatus McCulloch & Waite, 1918

= Stipecampus =

Species of fish

The ring-backed pipefish (Stipecampus cristatus) is a species of pipefish found in the waters of the Indian Ocean off the southern coast of Australia. It occurs on reefs in beds of red and brown algae down to depths of 15 metres (49 ft). This species grows to a length of 22 centimetres (8.7 in) SL. This species is the only known member of its genus.
