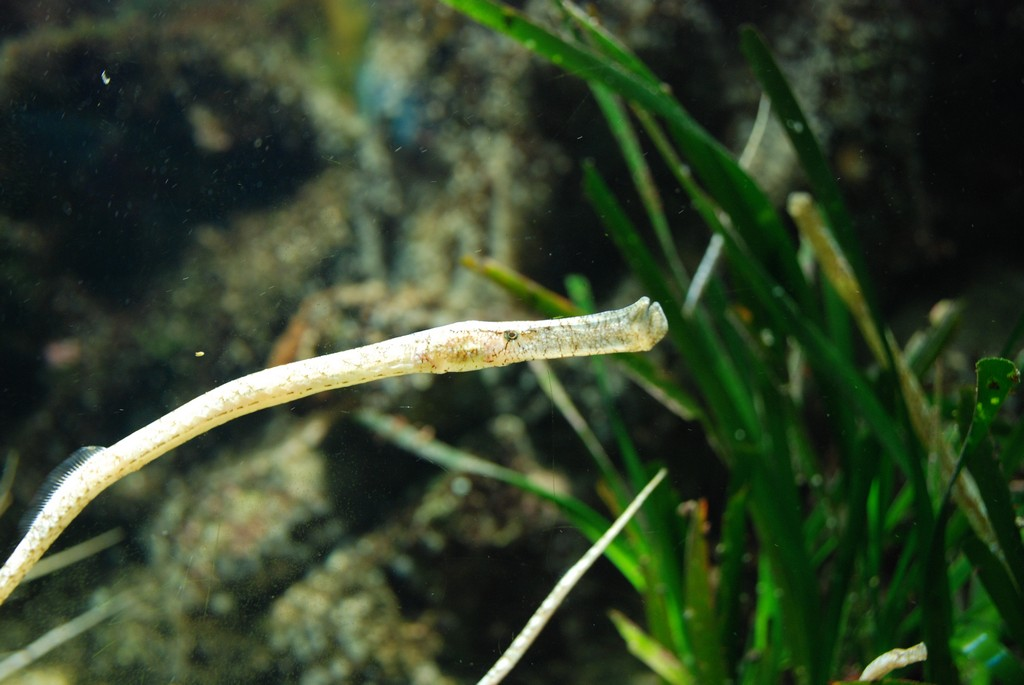
- Broadnosed pipefish (Syngnathus typhle)

Scientific classification
- Kingdom: Animalia
- Phylum: Chordata
- Class: Actinopterygii
- Division: Teleostei
- Order: Syngnathiformes
- Family: Syngnathidae
- Subfamily: Syngnathinae; Bonaparte, 1831

Genera
- See text.

= Pipefish =

Pipefish Temporal range: Early Oligocene–recent

Subfamily of fishes

Pipefishes or pipe-fishes (Syngnathinae) are a subfamily of small fishes, which, together with the seahorses and seadragons (Phycodurus and Phyllopteryx), form the family Syngnathidae. The name comes from Ancient Greek σύν (sún), meaning "together", and γνάθος (gnáthos), meaning "jaw", referring to the fused jaw that the subfamily's species have in common.

== Description ==
Pipefish look like straight-bodied seahorses with tiny mouths. The name is derived from the peculiar form of the snout, which is like a long tube, ending in a narrow and small mouth which opens upwards and is toothless. The body and tail are long, thin, and snake-like. They each have a highly modified skeleton formed into armored plating. This dermal skeleton has several longitudinal ridges, so a vertical section through the body looks angular, not round or oval as in the majority of other fishes.

A dorsal fin is always present, and is the principal (in some species, the only) organ of locomotion. The ventral fins are consistently absent, and the other fins may or may not be developed. The gill openings are extremely small and placed near the upper posterior angle of the gill cover.

Many are very weak swimmers in open water, moving slowly by means of rapid movements of the dorsal fin. Some species of pipefish have prehensile tails, as in seahorses. The majority of pipefishes have some form of a caudal fin (unlike seahorses), which can be used for locomotion. See fish anatomy for fin descriptions. Some species of pipefish have more developed caudal fins, such as the group collectively known as flagtail pipefish, which are quite strong swimmers.

== Habitat and distribution ==
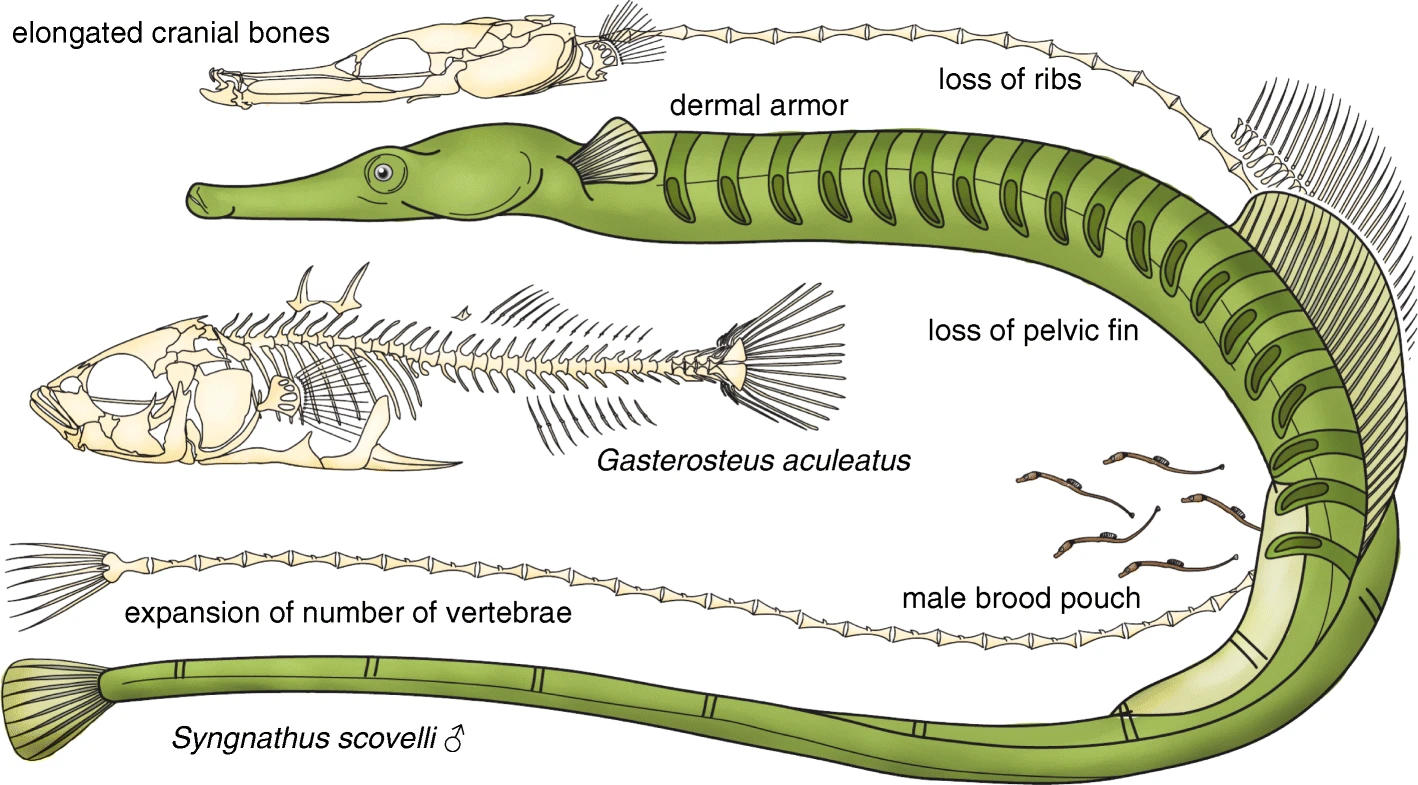
Some derived traits in pipefishes and their relatives Syngnathid fishes, such as the gulf pipefish, have increased numbers of vertebrae and an elongated head, are missing pelvic fins and ribs, and have an evolutionarily novel structure, the male brood pouch. Shown for comparison is the axial skeleton of a perch-like fish with more typical morphology, a threespine stickleback.

Most pipefishes are marine dwellers; only a few are freshwater species. They are abundant on coasts of the tropical and temperate zones. Most species of pipefish are usually 35–40 cm (14–15.5 in) in length and generally inhabit sheltered areas in coral reefs or seagrass beds.

== Habitat loss and threats ==
Due to their lack of strong swimming ability pipefish are often found in shallow waters that are easily disturbed by industrial runoffs and human recreation. Shorelines are also affected by boats and drag lines that move shoreline sediment. These disturbances cause a decrease in seagrasses and eelgrasses that are vital in pipefish habitats. The pipefish's narrow range distribution indicates that they are less able to adapt to new habitats or habitat change.

Another factor that affects pipefish populations is their use in traditional Chinese medicine (TCM) remedies, despite the lack of evidence of efficacy beyond placebo. Syngnathidae in general are in high demand for pseudo-scientific medicinal cures but pipefish are even more exploited because of a belief in their higher level of potency (because they are longer than the more common variety of seahorses).

The aquarium trade of pipefish has also increased in recent years.

== Reproduction and parental care ==
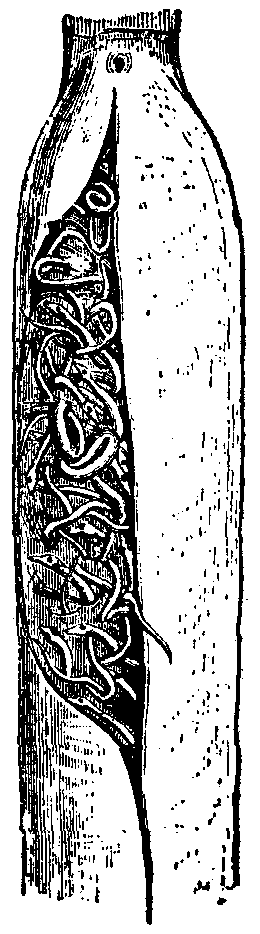
Subcaudal pouch of Syngnathus acus, with the young ready to leave the pouch: One side of the membrane of the pouch is pushed aside to allow a view of its interior.

Pipefishes, like their seahorse relatives, leave most of the parenting duties to the male, which provides all of the postzygotic care for its offspring, supplying them with nutrients and oxygen through a placenta-like connection. It broods the offspring either on distinct region of its body or in a brood pouch. Brood pouches vary significantly among different species of pipefish, but all contain a small opening through which female eggs can be deposited. The location of the brood pouch can be along the entire underside of the pipefish or just at the base of the tail, as with seahorses. Pipefish in the genus Syngnathus have a brood pouch with a ventral seam that can completely cover all of their eggs when sealed. In males without these pouches, eggs adhere to a strip of soft skin on the ventral surface of their bodies that does not contain any exterior covering. The evolution of male brooding in pipefish is thought to be a result of the reproductive advantage granted to pipefish ancestors that learned to deposit their eggs onto the males, who could escape predation and protect them. Furthermore, the ability to transfer immune information from both the mother (in the egg) and the father (in the pouch), unlike other chordates in which only the mother can transfer immune information, is believed to have an additive beneficial effect on offspring immunity.

Courtship between male and female pipefish involves lengthy and complicated shows of display. For example, in Syngnathus typhle, copulation is always preceded by a ritualized dance by both sexes. The dance involves very conspicuous wriggling and shaking motions, especially in comparison to the species' otherwise extremely secretive lifestyle. Under the threat or presence of a predator, pipefish are more reluctant to perform their dances. In addition, when risk of predation is high, they copulate less frequently, dance less per copulation, and females transfer more eggs per copulation. Although S. thyphle males normally prefer to mate with larger females, they mate randomly when potentially threatened by predators. Furthermore, in Corythoichthys haematopterus, similar ritualized mating dances were hypothesized to aid in reproductive synchronization, by allowing the female to assess male willingness to spawn so her eggs are not wasted.

During pipefish copulation, which signifies the termination of the courtship dance, the female transfers her eggs through a small ovipositor into the male brood pouch or onto the special patch of skin on the male's ventral body surface. While the eggs are being transferred, the mating pair rises through the water until implantation is complete. At this point, the male assumes an S-shaped posture and fertilizes the eggs, all the while descending back down the water column. Males possessing brood pouches release their sperm directly into them; the pouches are then vigorously shaken. The ventral seams are not opened until weeks later when the male pipefish give birth.

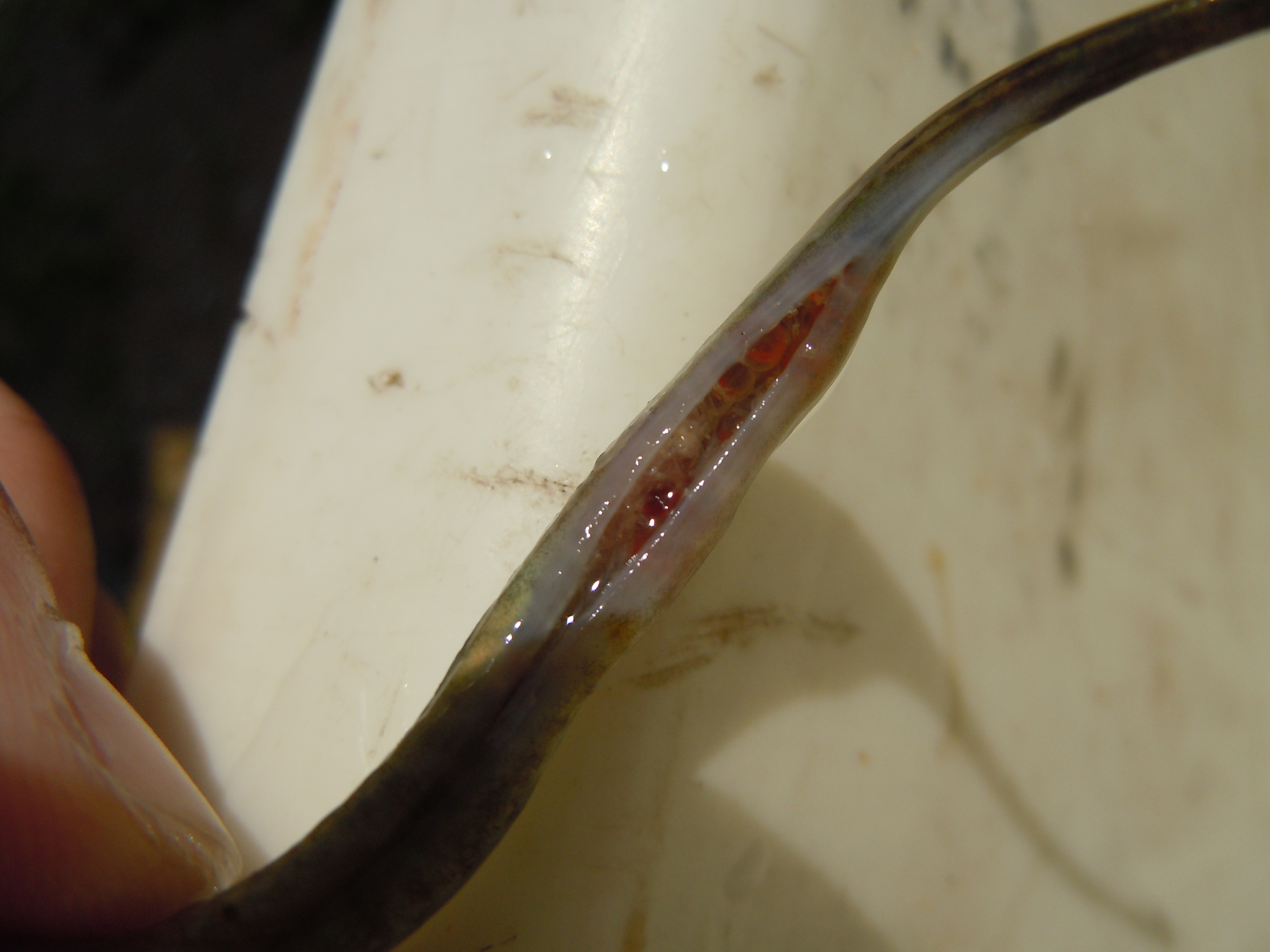
The subcaudal pouch of the male of the black-striped pipefish (Syngnathus abaster)

A physical limit exists for the number of eggs a male pipefish can carry, so males are considered to be the limiting sex. Females can often produce more eggs than males can accommodate inside their brood pouches, resulting in more eggs than can be cared for. Other factors may restrict female reproductive success, including male pregnancy length and energy investment in progeny.

Because the pipefish embryos develop within the male, feeding on nutrients supplied by him, male pipefish invest more energy than females in each zygote. Additionally, they invest more energy per unit time than females throughout each breeding season. As a result, some males may consume their embryos rather than continuing to rear them under situations to regain energy in which their bodies are exhausted of resources. Pregnant male pipefish can absorb nutrients from their broods, in a manner very similar to filial cannibalism found in many other families of fish. The smallest eggs in a brood of various egg sizes usually have lower survival rates than larger ones due to the larger eggs having a longer-lasting food source (absent contributions from the father), hence they are more likely to develop into mature adults. In other instances, some pipefishes may consume the embryos of mates that seem less fit or desirable, as each male generally copulates with more than one female.

Young are born free-swimming with relatively little or no yolk sac, and begin feeding immediately. From the time they hatch, they are independent of their parents, which at that time may view them as food. Some fry have short larval stages and live as plankton for a short while. Others are fully developed but miniature versions of their parents, assuming the same behaviors as their parents immediately.

Pair bonding varies wildly between different species of pipefish. While some are monogamous or seasonally monogamous, others are not.

Many species exhibit polyandry, a breeding system in which one female mates with two or more males. This tends to occur with greater frequency in internal-brooding species of pipefishes than with external-brooding ones due to limitation in male brood capacity. Polyandrous species are also more likely to have females with complex sexual signals such as ornaments. For example, the polyandrous Gulf pipefish (Syngnathus scovelli) displays considerable sexual dimorphic characteristics such as larger ornament area and number, and body size.

== Genera ==
- Subfamily Syngnathinae (pipefishes and seadragons)
  - Genus Acentronura Kaup, 1853
  - Genus Amphelikturus Parr, 1930
  - Genus Anarchopterus Hubbs, 1935
  - Genus Apterygocampus Weber, 1913
  - Genus Australyichthys Short, Foster & Gomon, 2026
  - Genus Bhanotia Hora, 1926
  - Genus Bryx Herald, 1940
  - Genus Bulbonaricus Herald, 1953
  - Genus Campichthys Whitley, 1931
  - Genus Choeroichthys Kaup, 1856
  - Genus Corythoichthys Kaup, 1853
  - Genus Cosmocampus Dawson, 1979
  - Genus Doryichthys Kaup, 1853
  - Genus Doryrhamphus Kaup, 1856
  - Genus Dunckerocampus Whitley, 1933
  - Genus Enneacampus Dawson, 1981
  - Genus Entelurus Duméril, 1870
  - Genus Festucalex Whitley, 1931
  - Genus Filicampus Whitley, 1948
  - Genus Halicampus Kaup, 1856
  - Genus Haliichthys Gray, 1859
  - Genus Heraldia Paxton, 1975
  - Genus Hippichthys Bleeker, 1849—river pipefishes
  - Genus Histiogamphelus McCulloch, 1914
  - Genus Hypselognathus Whitley, 1948
  - Genus Ichthyocampus Kaup, 1853
  - Genus Idiotropiscis Whitely, 1947
  - Genus Kaupus Whitley, 1951
  - Genus Kimblaeus Dawson, 1980
  - Genus Kyonemichthys Gomon, 2007
  - Genus Leptoichthys Kaup, 1853
  - Genus Leptonotus Kaup, 1853
  - Genus Lissocampus Waite and Hale, 1921
  - Genus Maroubra Whitley, 1948
  - Genus †Maroubrichthys Parrin, 1992 (Oligocene of Russia)
  - Genus Micrognathus Duncker, 1912
  - Genus Microphis Kaup, 1853—freshwater pipefishes
  - Genus Minyichthys Herald and Randall, 1972
  - Genus Mitotichthys Whitley, 1948
  - Genus Nannocampus Günther, 1870
  - Genus †Nepigastrosyngnathus Pharisat, 1993 (Oligocene of France)
  - Genus Nerophis Rafinesque, 1810
  - Genus Notiocampus Dawson, 1979
  - Genus Penetopteryx Lunel, 1881
  - Genus Phoxocampus Dawson, 1977
  - Genus Phycodurus Gill, 1896—leafy seadragon
  - Genus Phyllopteryx Swainson, 1839—seadragons
  - Genus Pseudophallus Herald, 1940—fluvial pipefishes
  - Genus Pugnaso Whitley, 1948
  - Genus Siokunichthys Herald, 1953
  - Genus Solegnathus Swainson, 1839
  - Genus Stigmatopora Kaup, 1853
  - Genus Stipecampus Whitley, 1948
  - Genus Syngnathoides Bleeker, 1851
  - Genus Syngnathus Linnaeus, 1758
  - Genus Trachyrhamphus Kaup, 1853
  - Genus Urocampus Günther, 1870
  - Genus Vanacampus Whitley, 1951

== Sources ==
- Froese, Rainer; Pauly, Daniel (eds.). "Family Syngnathidae". FishBase. November 2004 version.

Attribution
