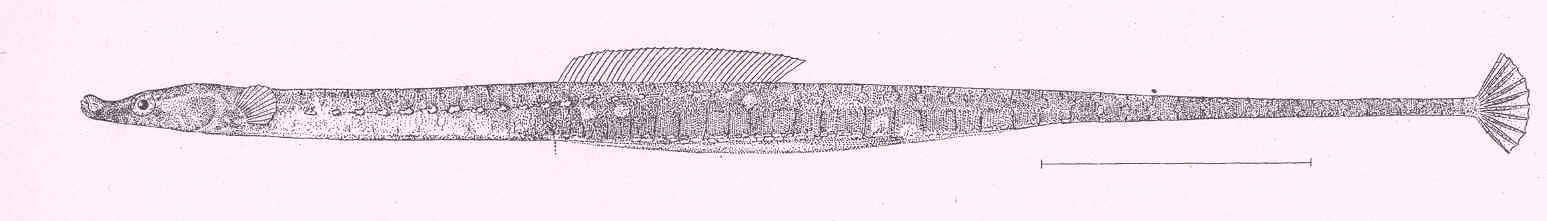
- Pseudophallus starksii

Scientific classification
- Kingdom: Animalia
- Phylum: Chordata
- Class: Actinopterygii
- Order: Syngnathiformes
- Family: Syngnathidae
- Subfamily: Syngnathinae
- Genus: Pseudophallus; Herald, 1940

Type species
- Siphostoma starksii Jordan & Culver 1895

= Pseudophallus =

Genus of fishes

Pseudophallus is a genus of freshwater pipefishes native to Central and South America.

== Species ==
There are currently three recognized species in this genus:

- Pseudophallus elcapitanensis (Meek & Hildebrand, 1914)
- Pseudophallus galadrielae Dallevo-Gomes, Mattox & Toledo-Piza, 2020
- Pseudophallus mindii (Meek & Hildebrand, 1923)
- Pseudophallus starksii (D. S. Jordan & Culver, 1895)
