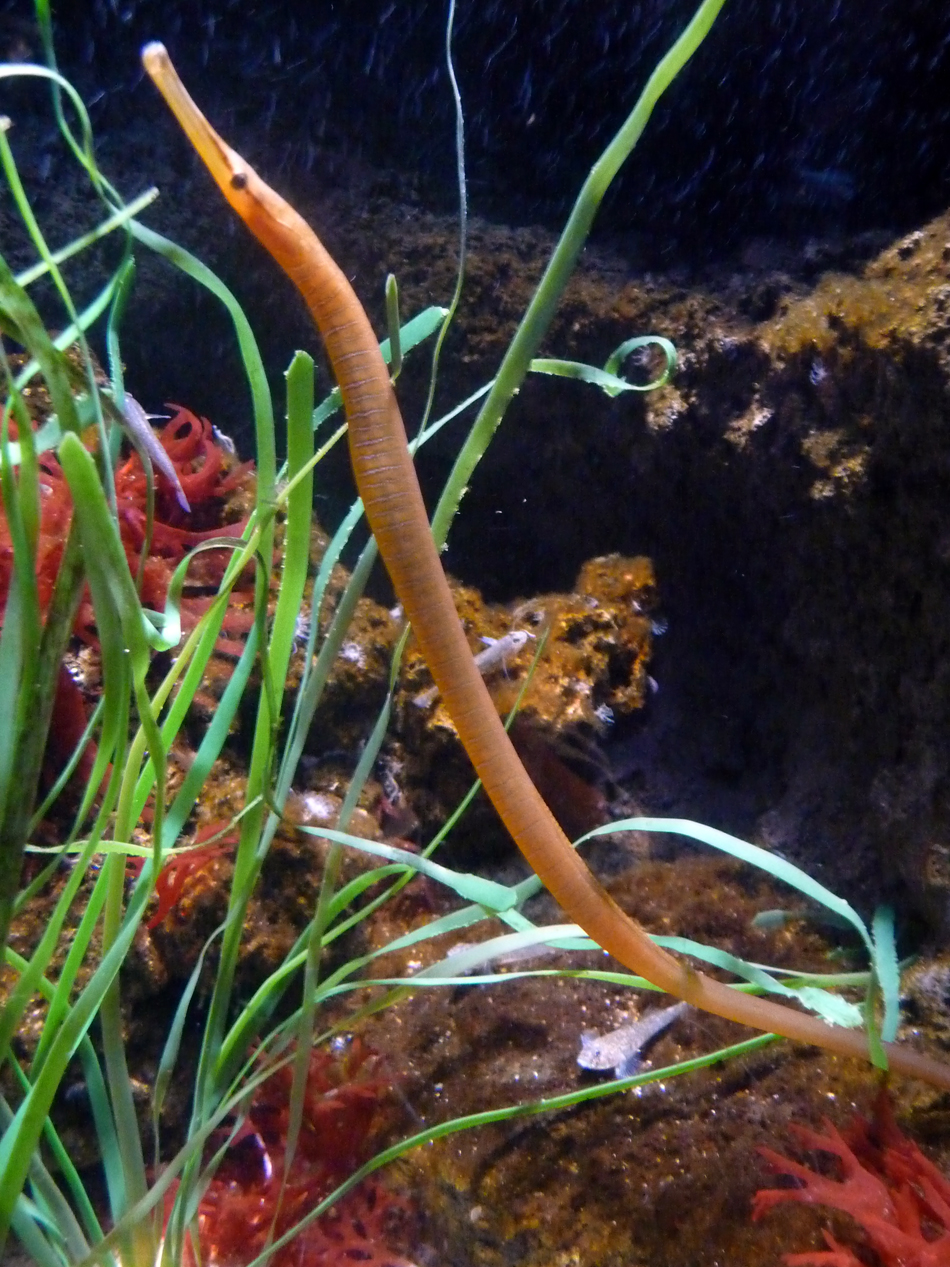

Conservation status
- Least Concern (IUCN 3.1)

Scientific classification
- Kingdom: Animalia
- Phylum: Chordata
- Class: Actinopterygii
- Order: Syngnathiformes
- Family: Syngnathidae
- Subfamily: Nerophinae
- Genus: Entelurus; A. H. A. Duméril, 1870
- Species: E. aequoreus

Binomial name
- Entelurus aequoreus (Linnaeus, 1758)

Synonyms
- Syngnathus aequoreus Linnaeus, 1758

= Snake pipefish =

Species of fish

The snake pipefish (Entelurus aequoreus) is a species of pipefish, from the family Syngnathidae, native to the northeastern Atlantic Ocean where they are generally found amongst algae close in to shore. It is the largest species of pipefish recorded in European waters and has spread into arctic waters in the early 2000s.

== Description ==
The snake pipefish has a very long, elongated and slender body which has a smooth skin and rounded cross-section and which is distinguished from other sympatric pipefishes by the near lack of bony rings. It has a long head, with a thin dark stripe in its sides, with a long, concave snout and a very small, protractile mouth. The long based dorsal fin has 37–47 short rays while the caudal fin is minute and there are no pectoral fins or anal fins. They are pale brown or yellowish-green in colour with each of the 28–31 rings on the body marked out by pale blue rings with dark margins. The opening to the gills has been reduced to a pore in the membrane above the opercle and the gill membranes are fused to the body and the isthmus. They can grow to total lengths of 40 centimetres (16 in) in males and 60 centimetres (24 in) in females, although they are more commonly around 32 centimetres (13 in) and 45 centimetres (18 in) respectively. The juveniles of less than 70 mm in length have membranous pectoral fins which disappear as they mature.

== Distribution ==
The snake pipefish occurs in the north eastern Atlantic from Iceland and Norway to the Azores, into the Baltic Sea. In the early 2000s it expanded its range northwards as far as Svalbard and the Barents Sea. It is not found in the Mediterranean Sea.

== Habitat and biology ==
The snake pipefish occurs in more open and deeper water than other species of pipefish, with a depth range of 10–100 metres (33–328 ft) and it lives among kelp and other types of deep water sea weeds, as well as sea grass such as Zostera marina, but some individuals both young and large adults have been caught in pelagic waters. Its colour and patterning provides good camouflage in such habitats. The colonisation of the Waddensee sand flats by the invasive Japanese seaweed Sargassum muticum has facilitated an increase of snake pipefish in that area.

They breed in mid summer when the males and females pair up. They are ovoviviparous, the female attaches over 1,000 fertilised eggs, each about 1.2 millimetres (0.047 in) in diameter, to a layer of sticky mucus in a groove on the male's belly where they remain until they hatch. Following their birth the fry are pelagic until they attain a length of 12 millimetres (0.47 in). The adults feed on small crustaceans and larval fish which are caught by being sucked into the mouth. It was noted when the populations of this species increased in the 2000s that some species of sea bird began to feed on the pipefish but found them rather indigestible due to their bony structure. Among those, auks and terns tried to feed these pipefish to their young as their more normal diet of sand-eels, had declined. However, the pipefish have limited nutritional value compared to the oily-fleshed sand-eels and many chicks choked on their hard, rather indigestible bodies.

== Etymology ==
The generic name Entelurus is derived from the Greek entelès which means "complete" and oura which means "tail" referring to the long tail which stretches out from the anus and how it's hardly differentiated from the body while the specific name is from the Latin aequoreus which means "marine".
