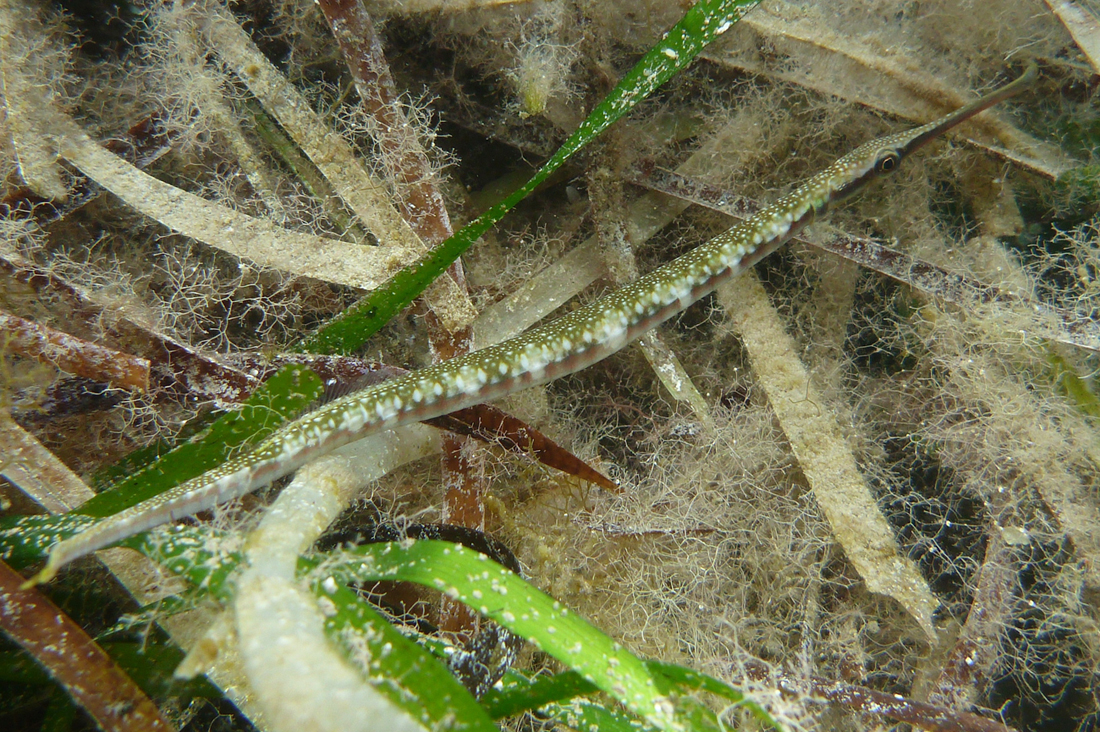

Conservation status
- Least Concern (IUCN 3.1)

Scientific classification
- Kingdom: Animalia
- Phylum: Chordata
- Class: Actinopterygii
- Order: Syngnathiformes
- Family: Syngnathidae
- Subfamily: Nerophinae
- Genus: Leptoichthys
- Species: L. fistularius

Binomial name
- Leptoichthys fistularius Kaup, 1853

Synonyms
- Leptoichthys castelnaui Macleay, 1881

= Leptoichthys fistularius =

Species of fish

Leptoichthys fistularius, the brush-tailed pipefish, is a species of pipefish of the family Syngnathidae, found in shallow to intermediate depths off the coast of southern Australia, usually in seagrass beds. This species is the largest known species of pipefish, growing to a maximum of 63 cm (25 in) in length. Like other pipefishes, the male carries the fertilized eggs in a pouch under his tail until they hatch. The genus name comes from the Greek leptos meaning "thin" and ichthys meaning "fish", the specific name refers to the resemblance of the head of this species to that of the fluteheads or cornetfishes of the family Fistulariidae.
