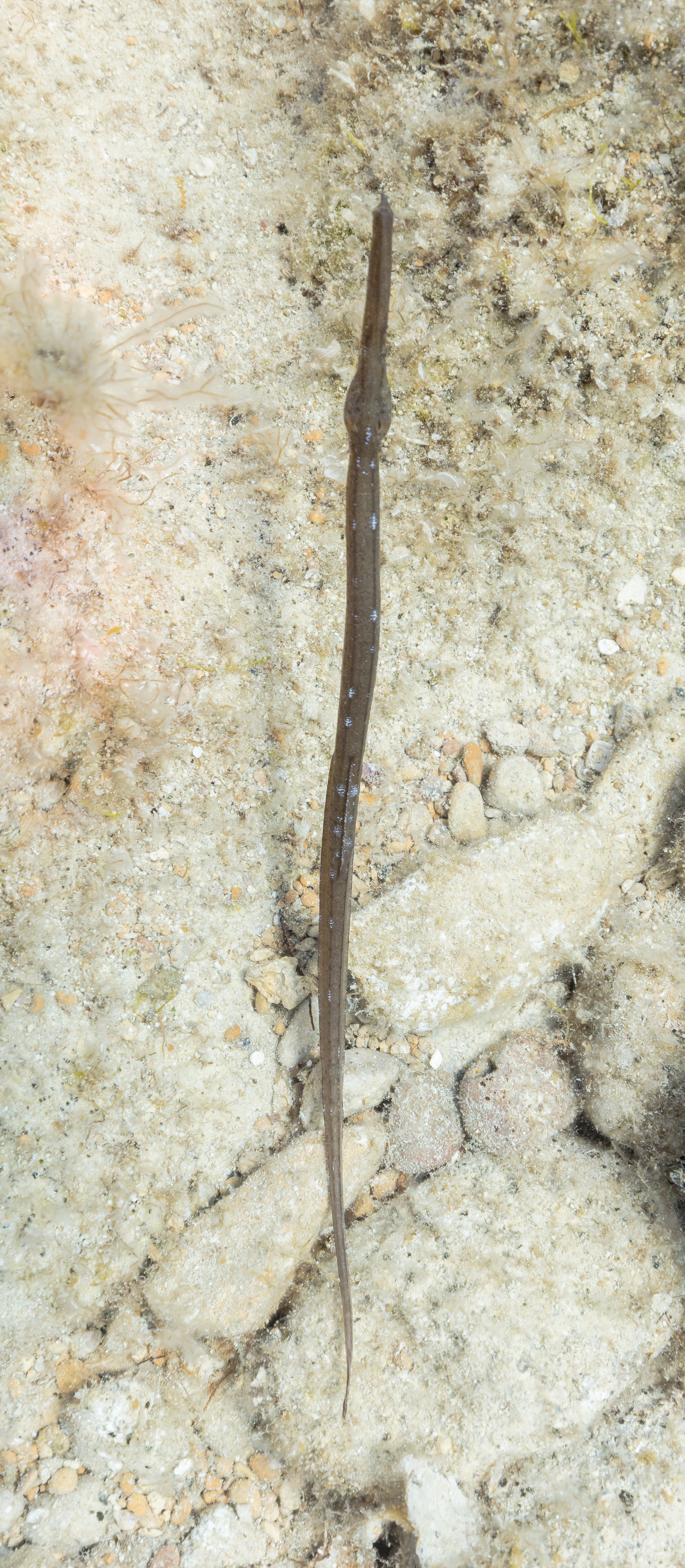

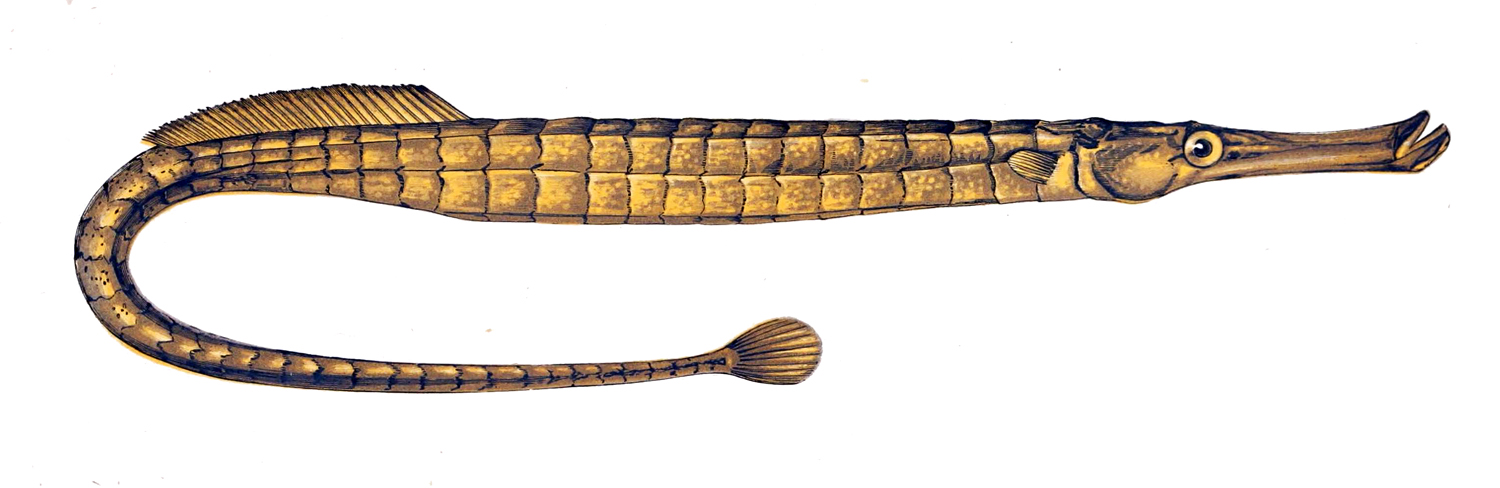

Conservation status
- Least Concern (IUCN 3.1)

Scientific classification
- Kingdom: Animalia
- Phylum: Chordata
- Class: Actinopterygii
- Order: Syngnathiformes
- Family: Syngnathidae
- Genus: Syngnathus
- Species: S. typhle

Binomial name
- Syngnathus typhle Linnaeus, 1758

Synonyms
- Siphonostoma typhle (Linnaeus, 1758); Siphostoma typhle (Linnaeus, 1758); Syngnathus argentatus Pallas, 1814; Syngnathus pelagicus Risso, 1810; Syngnathus ponticus Pallas, 1814; Syngnathus pyrois Risso, 1827; Syngnathus rondeletii Delaroche, 1809; Syngnathus rotundatus Michahelles, 1829; Syngnathus thyphle Linnaeus, 1758; Syngnathus viridis Risso, 1810; Syphonostoma typhle (Linnaeus, 1758); Tiphle hexagonus Rafinesque, 1810

= Broadnosed pipefish =

Species of fish

The broadnosed pipefish or deepnosed pipefish (Syngnathus typhle) is a fish of the family Syngnathidae (seahorses and pipefishes). It is native to the Eastern Atlantic ocean from Vardø in Norway, the Baltic Sea (north to the Gulf of Finland) and the British Isles in the north all the way to Morocco at south. It is also found in the Mediterranean Sea, Black Sea and Sea of Azov. It is common in the coastal shallow waters, usually on reefs with seagrasses. This species is notable for its "broad" snout, which is as deep as its body.

== Description ==
The broadnosed pipefish is a slender, elongated fish with a hexagonal cross-section which distinguishes it from its even more threadlike relation the straightnose pipefish (Nerophis ophidion), which has a circular cross-section. The body surface is covered by small bony plates. The head resembles that of a seahorse with a long, laterally flattened snout and obliquely sloping mouth. Unlike the straightnose pipefish, it has a fan-shaped caudal fin. The general colour is greenish, often with various darker mottling, and the belly is yellow. The average size is about 15 to 20 cm (6 to 8 in) with a maximum of 25 cm (10 in).

== Distribution ==
The broadnosed pipefish is native to the Eastern Atlantic, the Mediterranean Sea, the Black Sea and the Sea of Azov. Its range extends from Vardø, Norway to Morocco. It is found at depths to about 20 m (66 ft).

== Biology ==
The broadnosed pipefish tends to rest in a vertical position among the fronds of seaweed and feeds on plankton such as copepods which it sucks in through its mouth.

This species of pipefish has a sex-role reversed mating system in which females compete for access to males. This fish breeds in the summer. The male has a brood pouch into which several females deposit clutches of about twenty eggs and where the eggs are fertilised. The fry hatch after about four weeks and are expelled into the open water. Even after this the male continues to provide some parental care as the fry can retreat into the brood pouch in case of danger.

== Reproduction ==
=== Courtship and copulation ===
Males and females both actively court one another for mating, but courting is more frequent in females. Courtship and copulation follow a stereotyped pattern, beginning when one fish identifies a prospective mate nearby and performs the ritualized dance. If the other is receptive, the two align and continue the dance together until the female delivers her eggs into the male's brood pouch via an ovipositor. The male then shakes the eggs into his brood pouch, releases his sperm into the pouch and assumes an S-shaped posture to fertilize the eggs.

=== Mating system ===
These pipefish have a polygynandrous mating system, with both males and females mating with multiple partners during a breeding season.

Like other species of pipefish, the broadnosed pipefish is sex-role reversed: males brood the eggs and because of their increased investment in offspring are the choosier sex, whereas females compete more intensely than males for access to mates. Females can produce eggs faster than males can brood them, and are limited by the size of the male's brood pouch, which cannot carry all the eggs of a female similar to himself in size. Male brood time is approximately four to six weeks, during which time the male provides oxygen and nutrients to the developing embryos until they hatch. One to six females contribute to each brood clutch, which is the highest rate of multiple maternity in all of the pipefish species.

=== Mate choice ===
Although males are choosier than females, both sexes exhibit a preference for large mates due to a positive correlation between size and fecundity. Large females produce more and larger eggs and transfer more eggs per mating, while large males have increased brood clutch size and embryo weight. Males also exhibit an avoidance of females carrying high parasite loads, which is negatively correlated with fecundity.

The pipefish are not always able to mate with their preferred mates. For example, when predators are present, males are less choosy and mate indiscriminately with small and large females. However, both sexes can compensate for mating with non-preferred mates. For example, females deposit more proteinaceous eggs when mating with a lower quality male. This increases offspring viability since the smaller males are less able to nurture the embryos himself. Males, on the other hand, can selectively absorb the eggs of lower-quality females after copulation. By doing so, the male gains nutrients by ingesting the nutritious egg, which he can then allocate to caring for the embryos he sires with preferred, higher quality females in the future.
