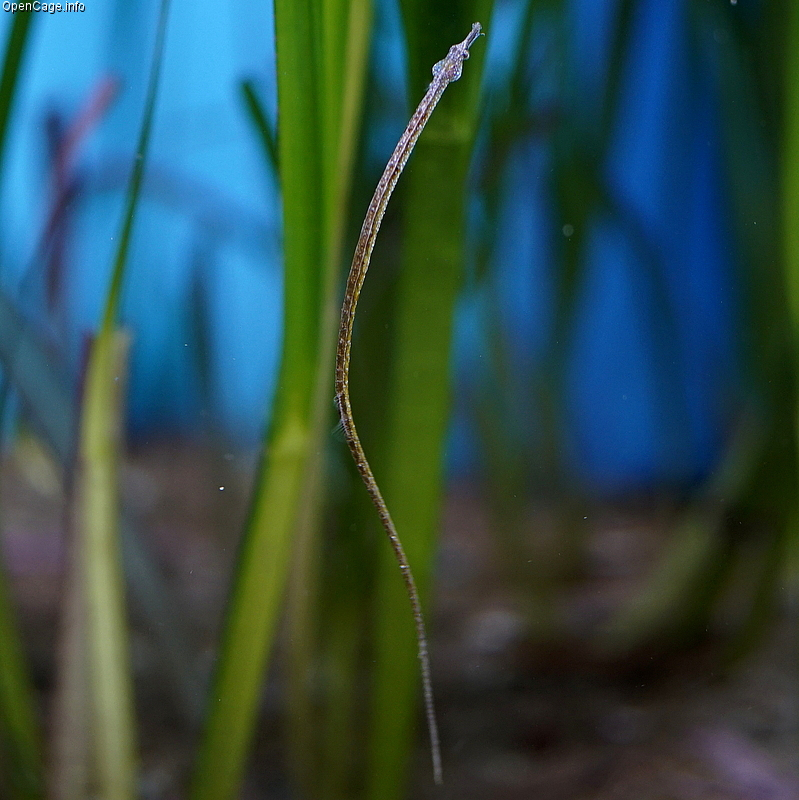
- Urocampus nanus

Scientific classification
- Domain: Eukaryota
- Kingdom: Animalia
- Phylum: Chordata
- Class: Actinopterygii
- Order: Syngnathiformes
- Family: Syngnathidae
- Subfamily: Syngnathinae
- Genus: Urocampus; Günther, 1870

Type species
- Urocampus nanus Günther, 1870

= Urocampus =

Genus of fishes

Urocampus is a genus of pipefishes native to the western Pacific Ocean.

== Species ==
There are currently two recognized species in this genus:

- Urocampus carinirostris Castelnau, 1872 (Hairy pipefish)
- Urocampus nanus Günther, 1870 (Barbed pipefish)
