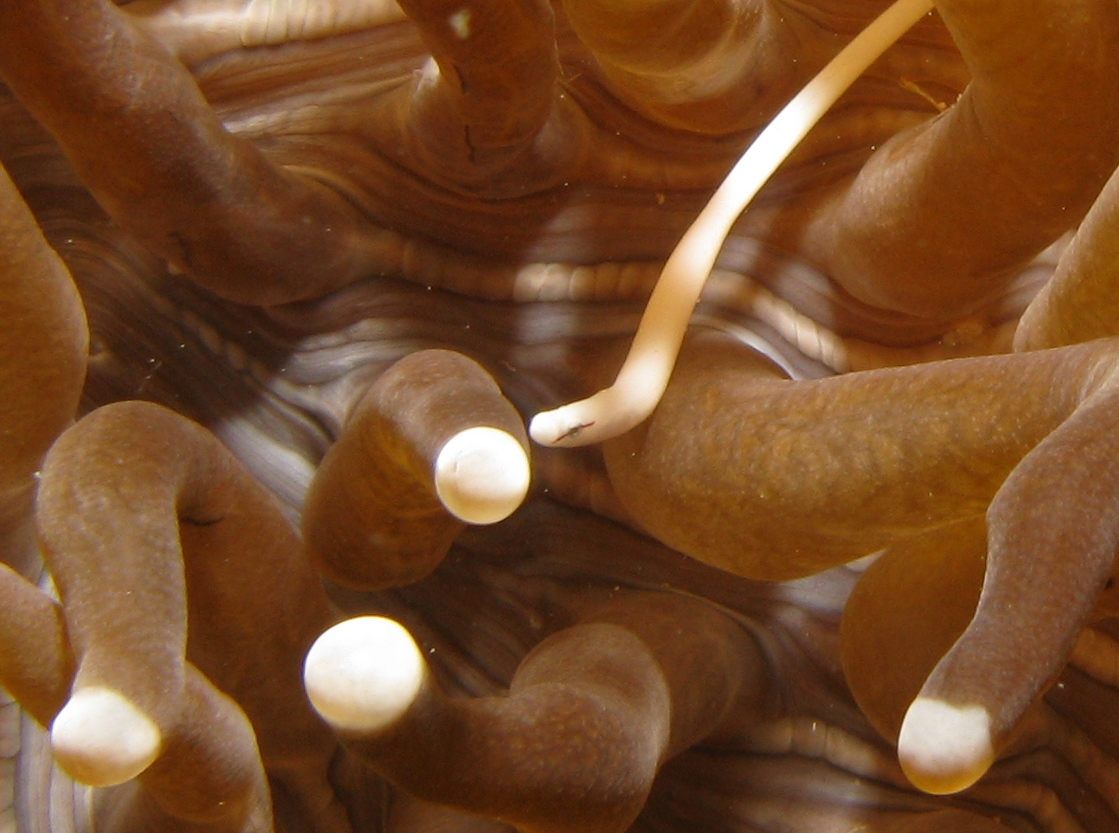
- S. nigrolineatus on Fungia sp. mushroom coral

Scientific classification
- Kingdom: Animalia
- Phylum: Chordata
- Class: Actinopterygii
- Order: Syngnathiformes
- Family: Syngnathidae
- Subfamily: Syngnathinae
- Genus: Siokunichthys; Herald, 1953

Type species
- Siokunichthys herrei Herald, 1953

= Siokunichthys =

Genus of fishes

Siokunichthys is a genus of pipefishes native to the Indian and Pacific Oceans. One species, Siokunichthys nigrolineatus, has a commensal relationship with mushroom corals of the genus Fungia.

== Species ==
There are currently six recognized species in this genus:

- Siokunichthys bentuviai E. Clark, 1966
- Siokunichthys breviceps J. L. B. Smith, 1963 (Softcoral pipefish)
- Siokunichthys herrei Herald, 1953 (Herre's pipefish)
- Siokunichthys nigrolineatus C. E. Dawson, 1983
- Siokunichthys southwelli (Duncker, 1910) (Southwell's pipefish)
- Siokunichthys striatus R. Fricke, 2004 (New Caledonian soft-coral pipefish)
