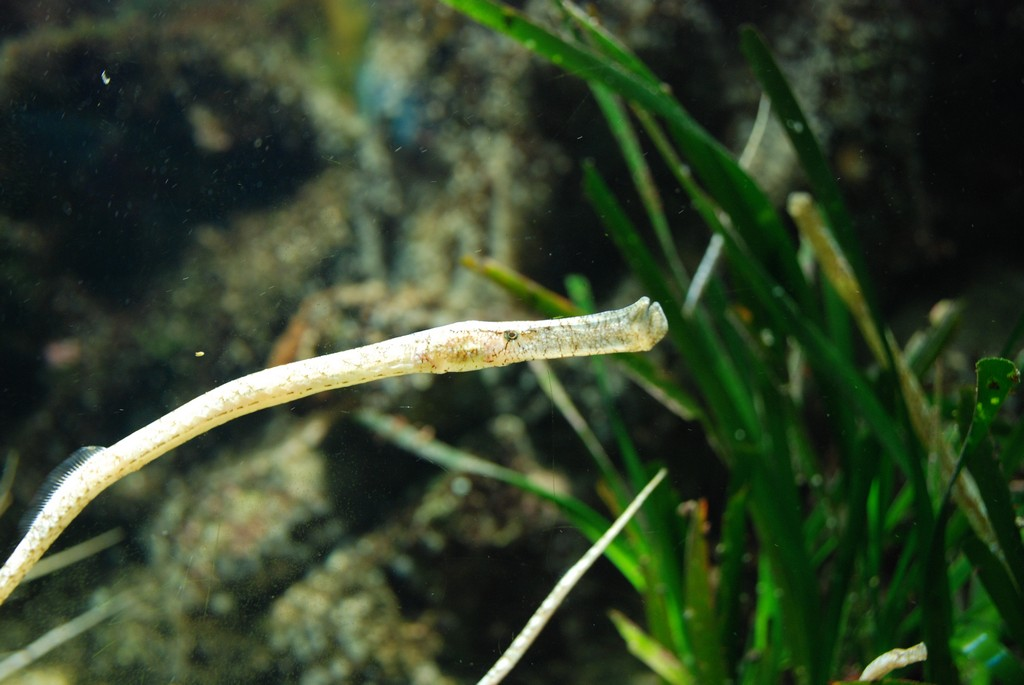
- Broadnosed pipefish, Syngnathus typhle

Scientific classification
- Kingdom: Animalia
- Phylum: Chordata
- Class: Actinopterygii
- Division: Teleostei
- Order: Syngnathiformes
- Suborder: Syngnathoidei
- Superfamily: Syngnathoidea
- Family: Syngnathidae; Bonaparte, 1831

Subfamilies and genera
- See text

= Syngnathidae =

Syngnathidae Temporal range: Danian-recent

Family of fishes

The Syngnathidae is a family of fish which includes seahorses, pipefishes, sea muppets (Australyichthys) and seadragons (Phycodurus and Phyllopteryx). The family name comes from Ancient Greek σύν (sún), meaning "together", and γνάθος (gnáthos), meaning "jaw", referring to the fused jaw that the entire family have in common.

== Description and biology ==
Syngnathids are found in temperate and tropical seas across the world. Most species inhabit shallow, coastal waters, but a few are known from the open ocean, especially in association with sargassum mats. They are characterised by their elongated snouts, fused jaws, the absence of pelvic fins, and by thick plates of bony armour covering their bodies. The armour gives them a rigid body, so they swim by rapidly fanning their fins. As a result, they are relatively slow compared with other fish but are able to control their movements with great precision, including hovering in place for extended periods.

Uniquely, after syngnathid females lay their eggs, the male then fertilizes and carries the eggs during incubation, using one of several methods. Male seahorses have a specialized ventral brood pouch to carry the embryos, male sea dragons attach the eggs to their tails, and male pipefish may do either, depending on their species. The most fundamental difference between the different lineages of the family Syngnathidae is the location of male brood pouch. The two locations are on the tail (Urophori) and on the abdomen (Gastrophori). There is also variation in Syngnathid pouch complexity with brood pouches ranging from simple ventral gluing areas to fully enclosed pouches. In species with more developed, enclosed pouches it has been demonstrated that males directly provide their brood with not only nutrients but also immunity to pathogens. Syngnathids with more developed brood pouches are also known to be able to partially or completely abort a brood from a female with low fitness.

A wide variety of mate choice and mating competition has been observed in Syngnathidae. For example, Hippocampus fuscus exhibits conventional sex roles of males competing for female access while Corythoichthys haematopterus is completely sex role reversed. Most conventional sex role syngnathids are monogamous whereas sex role reversed species mostly exhibit polygamous behavior.

Seahorses and pipefish also have a unique feeding mechanism, known as elastic recoil feeding. Although the mechanism is not well understood, seahorses and pipefish appear to have the ability to store energy from contraction of their epaxial muscles (used in upward head rotation), which they then release, resulting in extremely fast head rotation to accelerate their mouths towards unsuspecting prey.

== Evolution ==
Phylogenetic analysis implies that the most recent common ancestor of all syngnathids was likely pouchless. The family Solenostomidae (ghost pipefish) is a family in the order Syngnathiformes. Female ghost pipefish incubate their developing embryos inside fused pelvic fins. Evolutionary transitions from female to male care are practically nonexistent in teleosts, so brood pouches were likely not ancestral. Genome sequencing supports this, revealing multiple different origins across and within different brood pouch types. Oviparity was the ancestral trait, and the evolution of viviparity must have relied on the evolution and integration of multiple complex traits such as morphology, physiology, and behavior.

Syngnathidae was historically divided into two major lineages based on brood pouch location: Neophinae (located on the trunk) and Syngnathinae (located on the tail). Genome sequencing shows a parallel increase in brood pouch complexity in both Neophinae and Syngnathinae. Some species may have also independently evolved to have trunk brooding phenotypes, separate from the Neophinae. One example of this convergent evolution arises in pygmy seahorses (Hippocampus bargibanti, Hippocampus denise, Hippocampus pontohi). Pygmy seahorses are very small (about 1–2 cm tall) trunk brooders, phylogenetically surrounded by tail brooders. It is likely that the pygmy seahorse once had their brood pouch on their tail. The brood pouch may have moved locations when there was strong a correlated selection for a prehensile tail and diminutive size, resulting in a very small, trunk brooding organism.

Viviparity and male-pregnancy in Syngnathidae have a complex evolutionary history with many independent origins of similar traits. Early members of the family developed traits to limit the presence of deleterious mutations, allowing for more rapid evolution. The advantage of a more controlled and protected embryonic development seemed to be enough to enact evolutionary development throughout Syngnathidae to varying degrees.

In species with the most complex brood pouch systems, many traits (behavioral, physiological, morphological, and immunological) must have co‑evolved to allow for male pregnancy, driven by the increase of the fitness of those individuals’ offspring. The evolution of these traits resulted in a sex-role reversal in which females may exhibit competitive behavior for a mate.

Recent research, especially whole-genome sequencing, has allowed for greatly improved understanding of the evolutionary history of Syngnathidae, but there is still a need for further development in the field. Further investigations into the genetic mechanisms and selective motivation for the evolution of these traits in Syngnathidae may provide insight into the evolution of pregnancy separate from the female reproductive system.

The earliest syngnathids are known from the Paleocene (Danian) strata from the Dakhla Formation (Egypt) and from Eocene of Monte Bolca, Italy.

== Classification ==
In the past, this family was divided into two subfamilies: the elongated Syngnathinae, containing pipefish & seadragons, and the coiled Hippocampinae, containing seahorses and their presumed relatives. However, more recent genetic studies have found these divisions to be paraphyletic, with the seahorses being deeply nested within the pipefish, and the major division within the family being tail-brooding vs. trunk-brooding species. Due to this, the family has been re-circumscribed with its two major subfamilies being Nerophinae (trunk-brooders) and Syngnathinae (tail-brooders, including seahorses and seadragons). The split between these two families is thought to have occurred during the Paleocene.

=== Taxonomy ===
The following classification is based on Eschmeyer's Catalog of Fishes, with tribal divisions based on Stiller et al (2022):

- Family Syngnathidae Bonaparte, 1831
  - Subfamily Nerophinae Kaup, 1853 (trunk-brooding pipefishes)
    - Genus Heraldia Paxton, 1975
    - Genus Maroubra Whitley, 1948
    - Tribe Nerophini
      - Genus Entelurus Duméril, 1870
      - Genus Nerophis Rafinesque, 1810
      - Genus Leptoichthys Kaup, 1853
    - Tribe Doryrhamphini
      - Genus Doryrhamphus Kaup, 1856
      - Genus Dunckerocampus Whitley, 1933
    - Tribe Microphini
      - Genus Belonichthys Peters, 1868
      - Genus Choeroichthys Kaup, 1856
      - Genus Coelonotus Peters, 1855
      - Genus Microphis Kaup, 1853 (=Doryichthys)
  - Subfamily Syngnathinae Bonaparte, 1831 (tail-brooding pipefishes)
    - Genus Bulbonaricus Herald, 1953
    - Genus Stipecampus Whitley, 1948
    - Genus Kimblaeus Dawson, 1980
    - Genus Kyonemichthys Gomon, 2007
    - Genus Notiocampus Dawson, 1979
    - Tribe Solegnathini (seadragons and allies)
      - Genus Phycodurus Gill, 1896
      - Genus Phyllopteryx Swainson, 1839
      - Genus Solegnathus Swainson, 1839
      - Genus Syngnathoides Bleeker, 1851
    - Tribe Stigmatoporini
      - Genus Corythoichthys Kaup, 1853
      - Genus Stigmatopora Kaup, 1853
    - Tribe Leptonotini
      - Genus Apterygocampus Weber, 1913
      - Genus Bhanotia Hora, 1926
      - Genus Campichthys Whitley, 1931
      - Genus Cosmocampus Dawson, 1979 (in part)
      - Genus Hippichthys Bleeker, 1849
      - Genus Histiogamphelus McCulloch, 1914
      - Genus Hypselognathus Whitley, 1948
      - Genus Festucalex Whitley, 1931
      - Genus Ichthyocampus Kaup, 1853
      - Genus Leptonotus Kaup, 1853
      - Genus Micrognathus Duncker, 1912
      - Genus Minyichthys Herald & J. E. Randall, 1972
      - Genus Mitotichthys Whitley, 1948
      - Genus Nannocampus Günther, 1870
      - Genus Phoxocampus Dawson, 1977
      - Genus Pugnaso Whitley, 1948
      - Genus Kaupus Whitley, 1951
      - Genus Siokunichthys Herald, 1953
      - Genus Vanacampus Whitley, 1951
      - Genus Urocampus Günther, 1870
    - Tribe Syngnathini
      - Genus Amphelikturus Parr, 1930
      - Genus Anarchopterus Hubbs, 1935
      - Genus Bryx Herald, 1940
      - Genus Cosmocampus Dawson, 1979 (in part)
      - Genus Enneacampus Dawson, 1981
      - Genus Halicampus Kaup, 1856
      - Genus Penetopteryx Lunel, 1881
      - Genus Pseudophallus Herald, 1940
      - Genus Syngnathus Linnaeus, 1758 (type genus)
    - Tribe Haliichthyini
      - Genus Acentronura Kaup, 1853
      - Genus Australyichthys Short, Foster, & Gomon, 2026
      - Genus Cylix Short & Trnski, 2021
      - Genus Filicampus Whitley, 1948
      - Genus Haliichthys Gray, 1859
      - Genus Idiotropiscis Whitley, 1947
      - Genus Lissocampus Waite & Hale, 1921
      - Genus Trachyrhamphus Kaup, 1853
    - Tribe Hippocampini
      - Genus Halicampus Kaup, 1856
      - Genus Hippocampus Rafinesque, 1810 (seahorses)

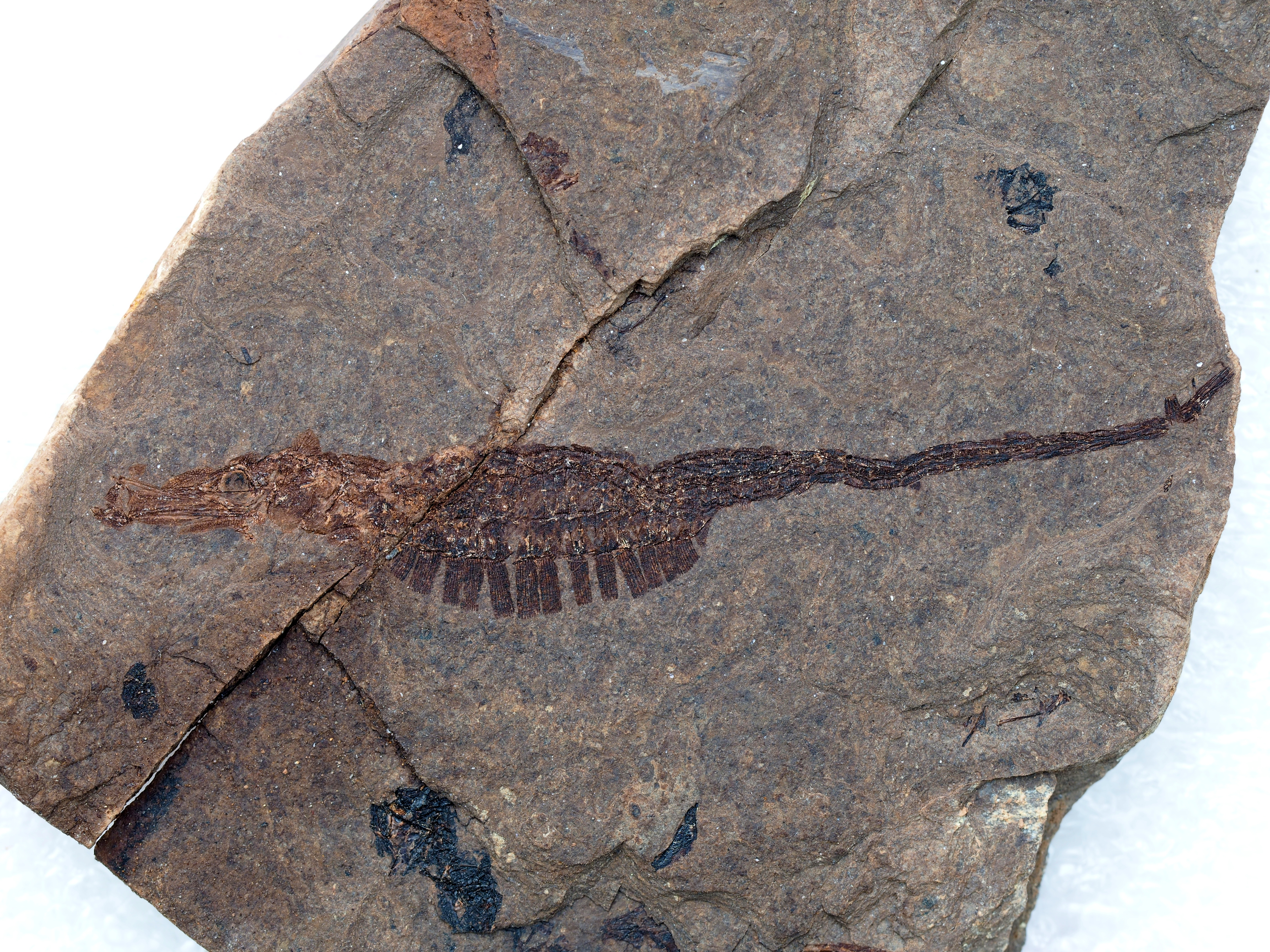
Fossil specimen of Hipposyngnathus

=== Fossil taxa ===
- Species †"Syngnathus" bolcensis de Zigno, 1887 (Early Eocene of Italy)
- Species †"Syngnathus" heckeli de Zigno, 1874 (Early Eocene of Italy)
- Genus †Nepigastrosyngnathus Pharisat, 1993 (Early Oligocene of France)
- Genus †Prosolenostomus Blot, 1981 (Early Eocene of Italy)
- Subfamily †Pshekhagnathinae Bannikov et al., 2017
  - Genus †Pshekhagnathus Bannikov et al., 2017 (Early Oligocene of North Caucasus, Russia)
- Subfamily Nerophinae Kaup, 1853
  - Genus †Hipposyngnathus Daniltshenko, 1960 (Early Oligocene to Late Miocene of North Caucasus, Poland, and California, USA. Possibly in own family, Eogastrophinae)
  - Genus †Maroubrichthys Parin, 1992 (Early Oligocene of North Caucasus, Russia)
- Subfamily Syngnathinae Bonaparte, 1831
  - Genus †Hippohaliichthys Žalohar & Hitij, 2017 (Middle Miocene of Slovenia)
  - Genus †Hippotropiscis Žalohar & Hitij, 2012 (Middle Miocene of Slovenia)

== Images ==
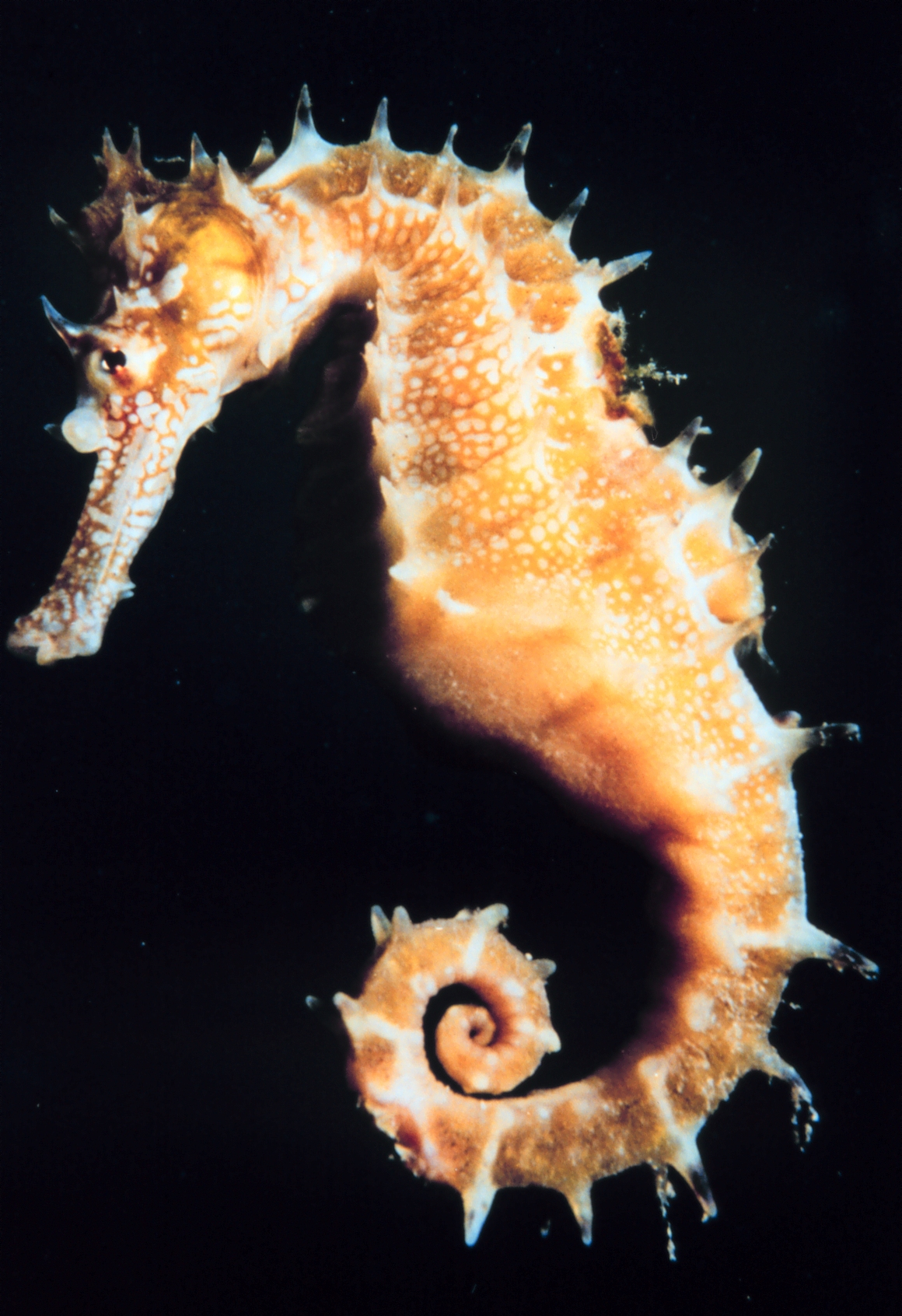
Seahorse

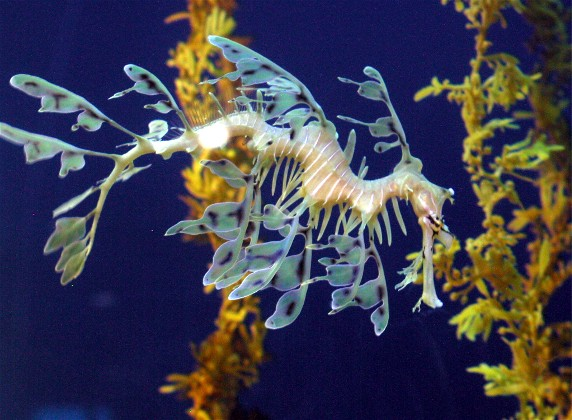
Leafy seadragon

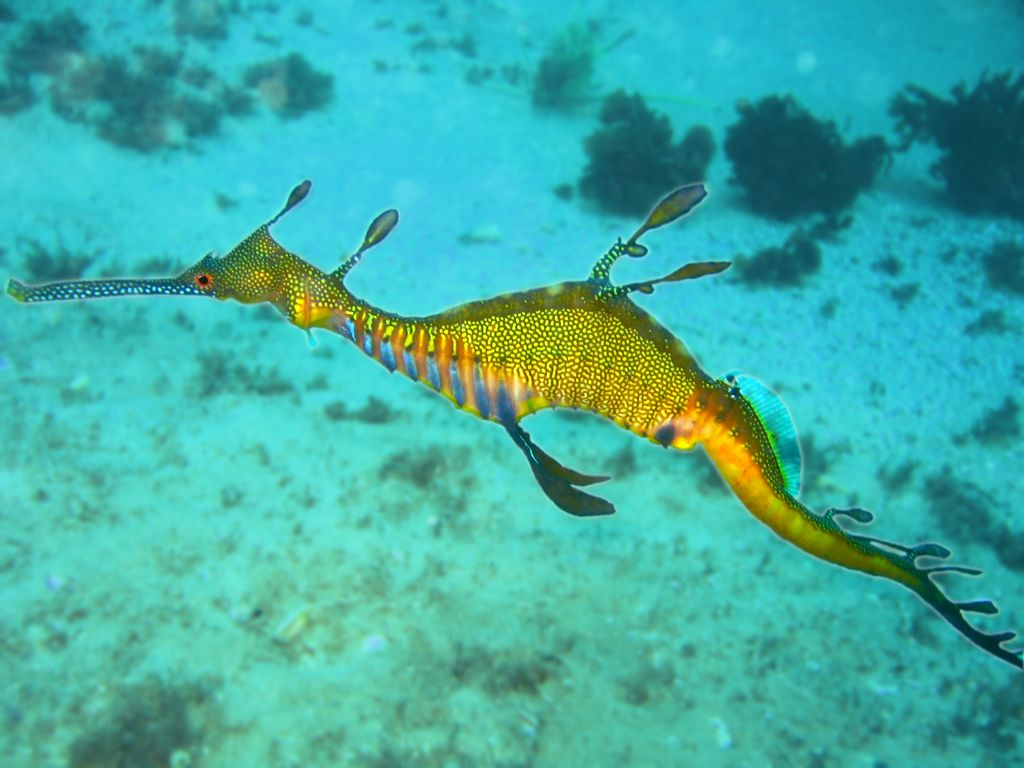
Weedy seadragon

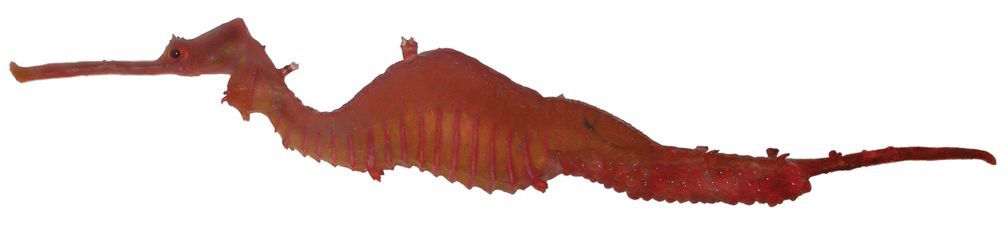
Ruby seadragon

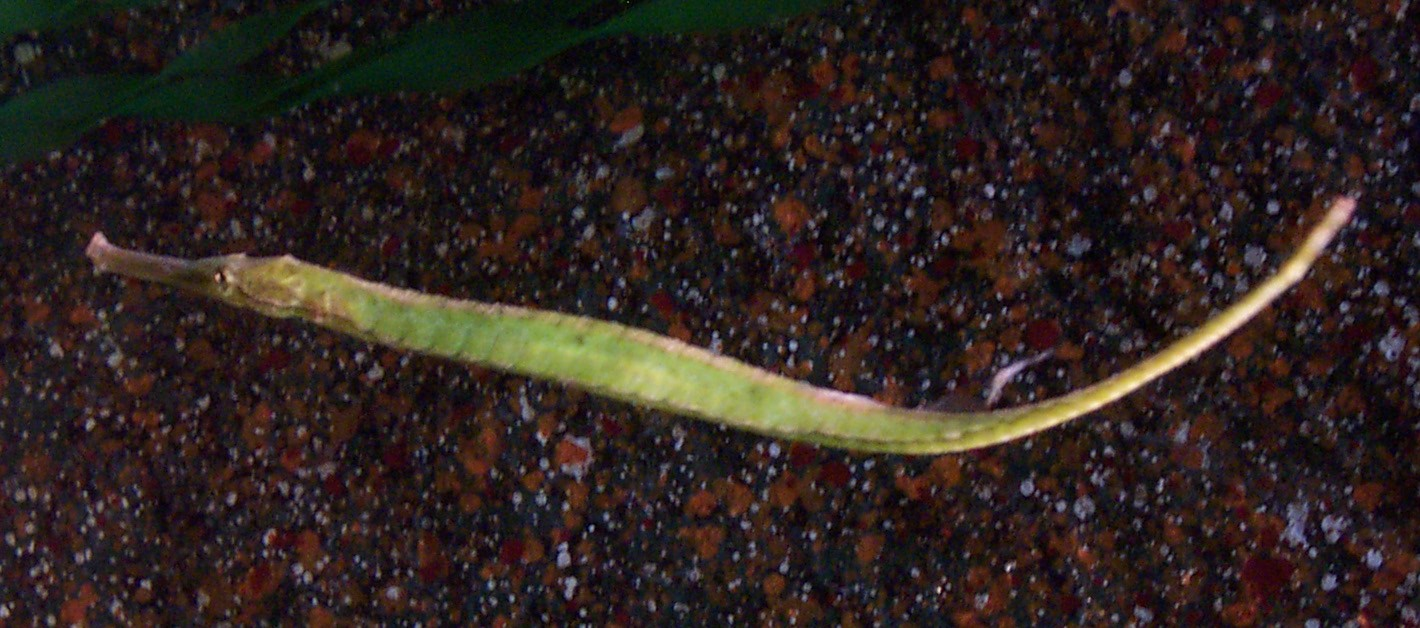
Pipefish

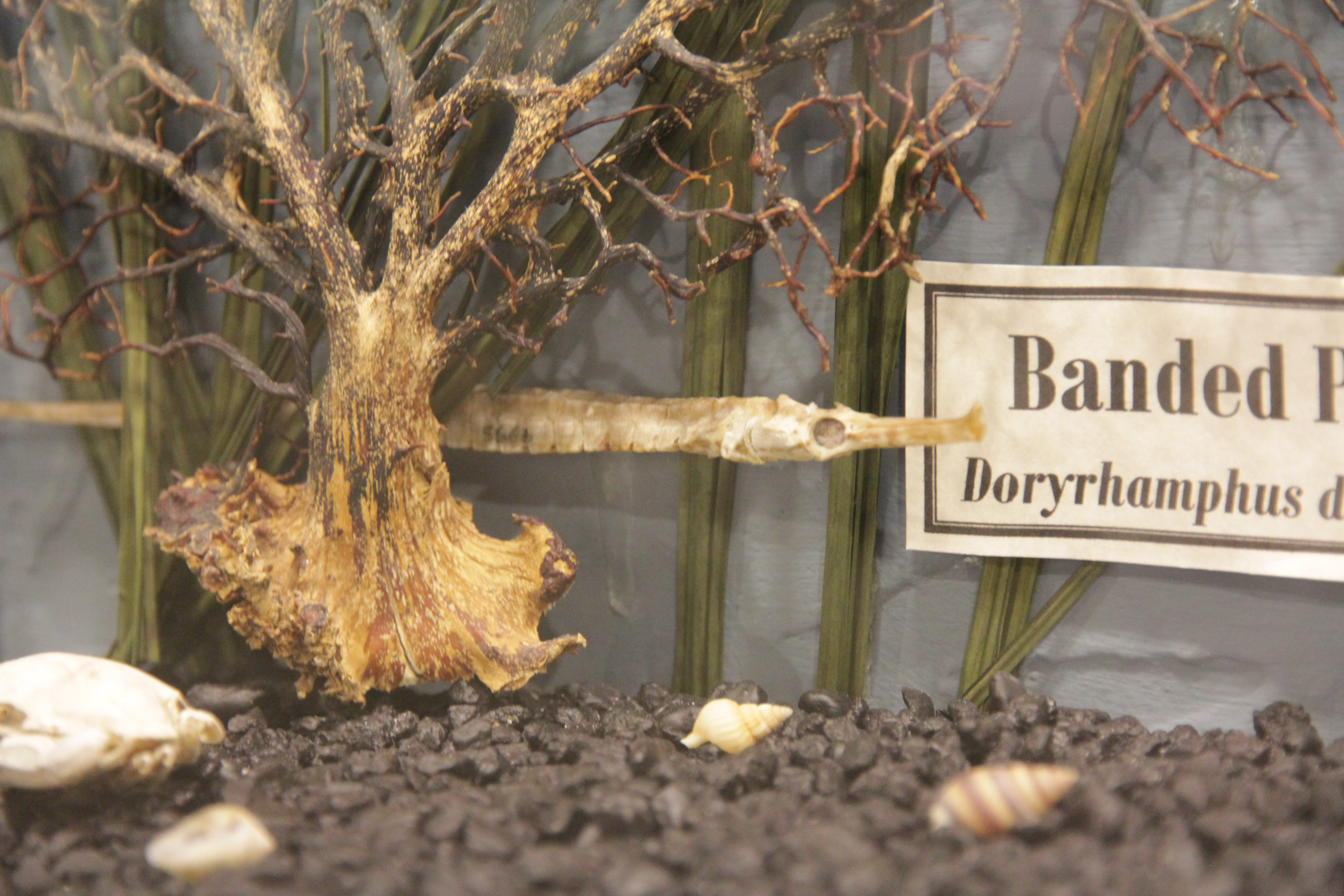
Skeleton of a banded pipefish (Dunckerocampus dactyliophorus) on display at the Museum of Osteology.
