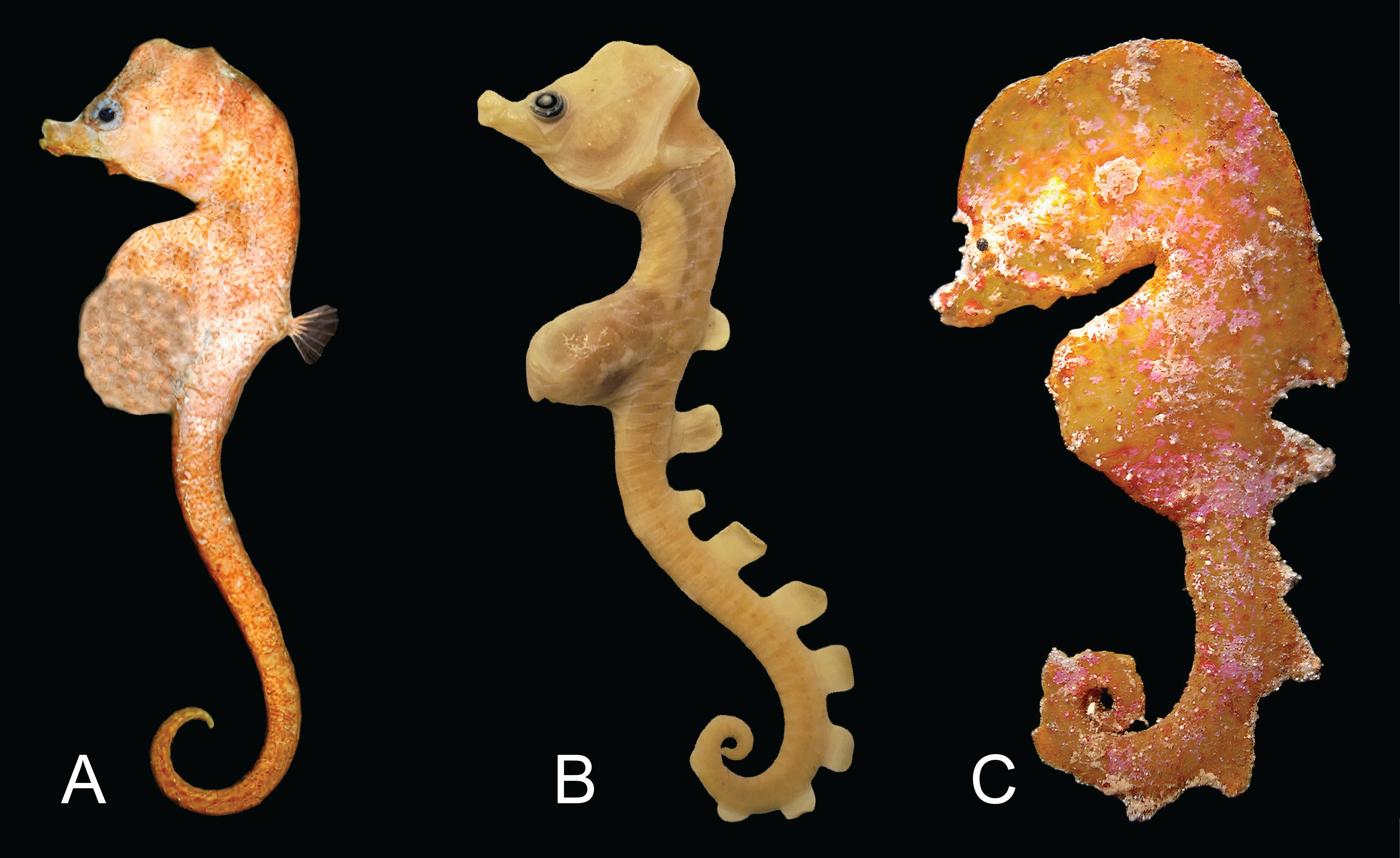
- (A) Australyichthys minotaur, freshly collected (B) Australyichthys paradoxus, preserved (C) Australyichthys aegis, freshly collected

Scientific classification
- Kingdom: Animalia
- Phylum: Chordata
- Class: Actinopterygii
- Division: Teleostei
- Order: Syngnathiformes
- Family: Syngnathidae
- Subfamily: Syngnathinae
- Tribe: Haliichthyini
- Genus: Australyichthys; Short, Foster & Gomon, 2026 in Short et al., 2026

Type species
- Hippocampus minotaur Gomon, 1997

Species
- Australyichthys minotaur (Gomon, 1997) Short et al., 2026; Australyichthys paradoxus (Foster & Gomon, 2010) Short et al., 2026; Australyichthys aegis Foster & Gomon, 2026 in Short et al., 2026
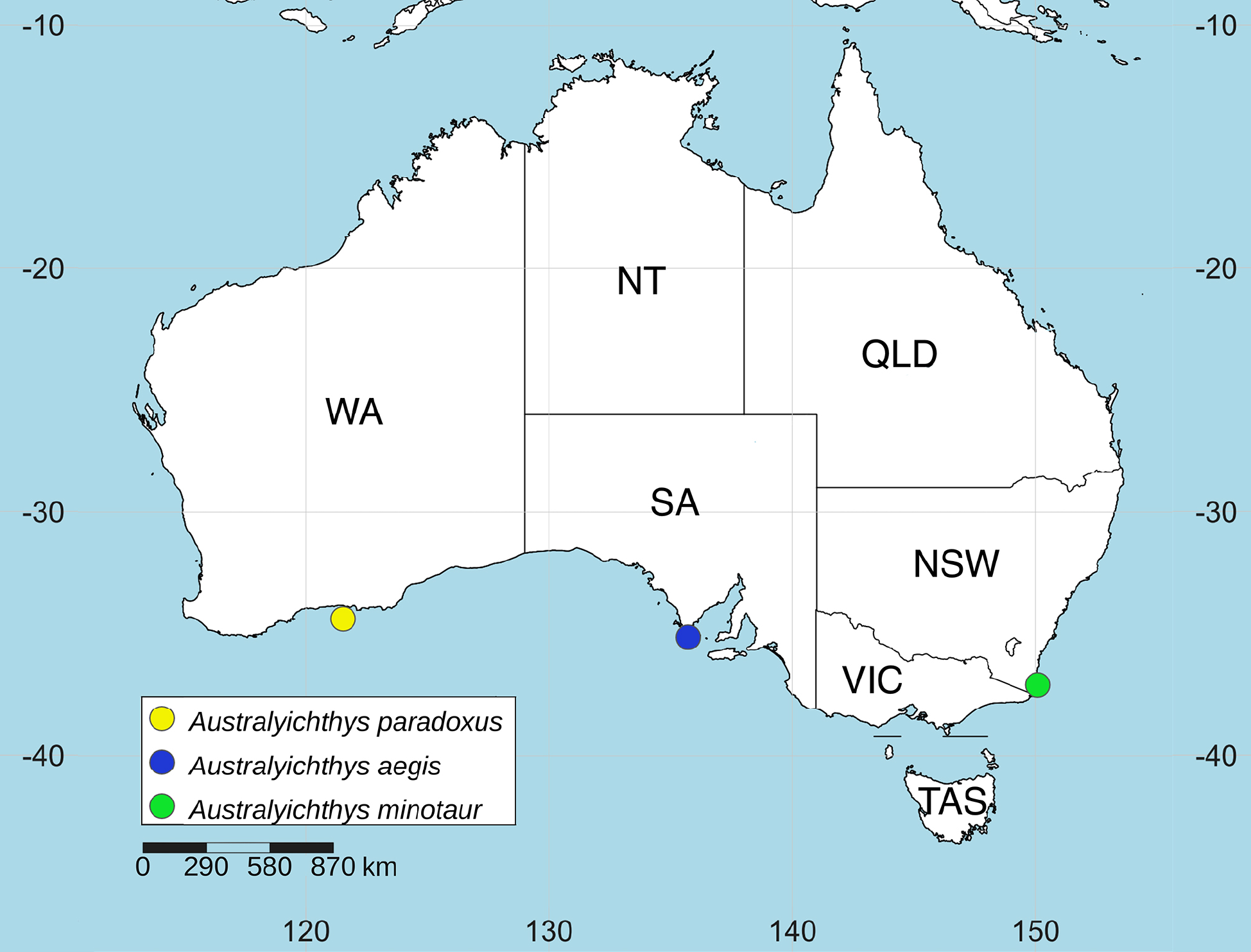

= Australyichthys =

Genus of ray-finned fish

Australyichthys is a genus of seahorse-like ray-finned fishes in the family Syngnathidae, endemic to the temperate mesophotic ecosystems of southern Australia. It was named in 2026 by Short, Foster, Gomon and co-authors, and comprises three species: the type species A. minotaur, A. paradoxus, and A. aegis. All known specimens derive from structurally complex benthic habitats at depths of approximately 50–124 metres (164–407 ft).

Members of the genus resemble true seahorses (genus Hippocampus) in external morphology, including their possession of a ventrally angled head (angled toward the animal's underside), a fully enclosed male brood pouch, and a prehensile tail; initially, A. minotaur and A. paradoxus were indeed assigned to the seahorse genus Hippocampus due to these characteristics. Genetics-based phylogenetic analyses would, however, place Australyichthys within Haliichthyini, a tribe in the pipefish subfamily Syngnathinae distant from Hippocampus (tribe Hippocampini). Its hippocampiform body plan is therefore the result of convergent evolution. The genus is represented by only eight specimens collected incidentally over nearly eighty years, none within the last two decades, and has not been observed alive. On this basis, it has been regarded as a "lost" taxon.

The common name sea muppet has been proposed for members of this genus, in reference to their enlarged, domed heads and fleshy dermal lobes resembling features of some characters in The Muppet Show.

== Taxonomy ==
The two earlier described species were originally assigned to Hippocampus on the basis of their external similarity to seahorses. Hippocampus minotaur was described by Gomon in 1997 from off Eden, New South Wales, and Hippocampus paradoxus by Foster and Gomon in 2010 from off Esperance, Western Australia. Both assignments relied chiefly on external morphology and radiography, which could not resolve internal skeletal structure through the thick integument.

A third specimen, preserved in ethanol, was subsequently collected from the entrance to Spencer Gulf, South Australia. Bridging the New South Wales and Western Australian records across more than 2,500 km of coastline, it enabled re-examination of the lineage using high-resolution micro-computed tomography (CT) and genome-scale phylogenomic data. These analyses showed that the three species form a morphologically cohesive group defined by a ventral trunk skeleton unlike that of any other syngnathid, and that the group falls within the tribe Haliichthyini rather than among the seahorses (tribe Hippocampini). In 2026, the two Hippocampus species were accordingly transferred to the newly erected genus Australyichthys as A. minotaur comb. nov. and A. paradoxus comb. nov., and the Spencer Gulf specimen was described as A. aegis sp. nov.

=== Etymology ===
The generic name combines the Latin australis ("southern"), for the group's restriction to southern Australia, with the Greek ichthys ("fish"), for its placement in the Syngnathidae. The gender is masculine.

== Description ==
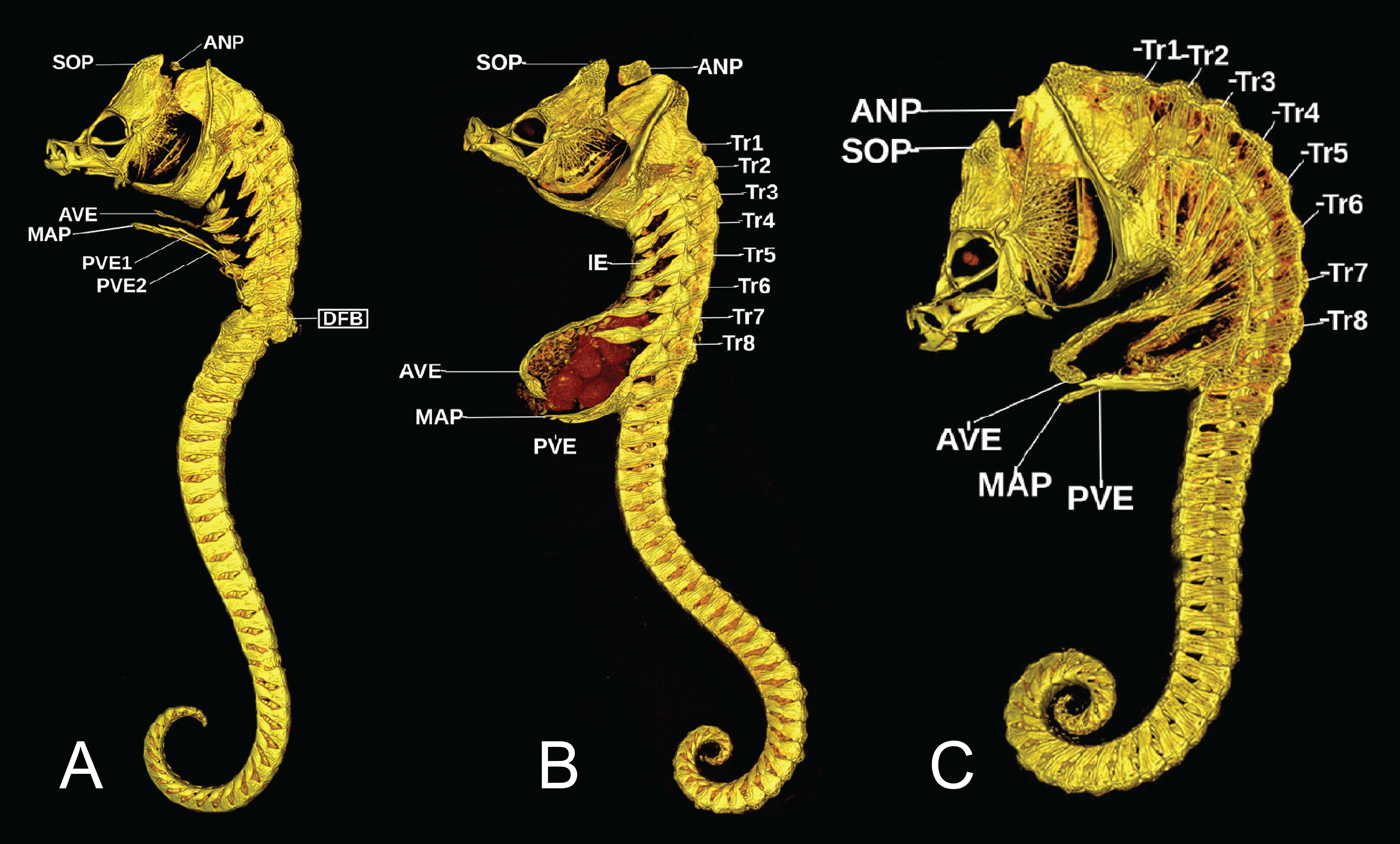
CT scans of the skeletons of the three Australyichthys species: (A) A. minotaur, (B) A. paradoxus, (C) A. aegis

Species of Australyichthys are small, ranging from approximately 34–65 millimetres (1.3–2.6 in) in standard length. The head is large and fleshy, with a short snout, and is angled ventrally relative to the trunk axis at approximately 90°, as in seahorses. The body is soft and externally unsegmented, the ring boundaries and spination typical of most syngnathids being obscured by a thick integument. A series of fleshy dermal lobes extends along the dorsal midline from the trunk onto the tail. These lobes lack bony support and thereby differ from the appendages of seadragons (Phycodurus and Phyllopteryx) and from the dorsolateral appendages of the ribboned pipehorse Haliichthys taeniophorus. The tail is prehensile and lacks a caudal fin, and males bear a fully enclosed brood pouch.

The genus is diagnosed osteologically, on internal skeletal structure resolved by CT imaging rather than on external form. Its principal diagnostic character is a derived ventral trunk support complex that replaces the continuous ventral ridge present in other syngnathids. The complex comprises three components: paired or median anterior ventral elements (AVE) from the inferior trunk plates, paired posterior ventral elements (PVE) from the terminal trunk ring, and a single median anal pterygiophore (MAP) between them. In other syngnathids, including Hippocampus, the inferior and ventral plates meet at the ventral midline to form a rigid enclosure around the body cavity. In Australyichthys the ventral plates are absent, the inferior plates do not meet at the midline, and ventral support is provided entirely by the AVE–PVE–MAP complex. This configuration is unknown in any other syngnathid genus and is the primary basis for generic recognition.

Further diagnostic characters include an elevated supraoccipital, a reduced anterior nuchal plate that is not integrated with the supraoccipital and therefore does not form the "coronet" characteristic of seahorses, fused superior and lateral trunk plates, a robust cleithrum, a first vertebra with a bifurcated anterior margin, and the absence of spination. Meristic values comprise eight trunk rings, 38–42 tail rings, 10–11 pectoral-fin rays, and four or fewer anal-fin rays, the latter vestigial or absent in adults.

The single anal pterygiophore (MAP) is interpreted as positionally homologous with the consolidated anal-fin pterygiophore complex of seahorses. Its position relative to the brood pouch suggests a mechanical role in pouch dilation during parturition, comparable to the pterygiophore–muscle system documented in Hippocampus.

=== Reproduction and sexual dimorphism ===
As in seahorses, males brood the developing young in a fully enclosed pouch on the ventral surface of the posterior trunk. CT imaging of one male A. minotaur revealed approximately nine embryos within the pouch, positioned beneath the combined PVE–MAP complex. This was the first direct visualisation of male brooding in the genus. Females lack pouches. Hydrated oocytes are retained within the abdominal cavity between the AVE and PVE, one female A. paradoxus containing 11 such oocytes, each approximately 2 mm in diameter.

Sexual dimorphism is best documented in A. minotaur, the only species known from both sexes. Males possess a more steeply inclined supraoccipital, four AVE units (versus two elongate units in females), and elongate, rod-like PVE that form a rigid support dorsal to the pouch, whereas females possess broader, spatulate PVE.

== Species ==
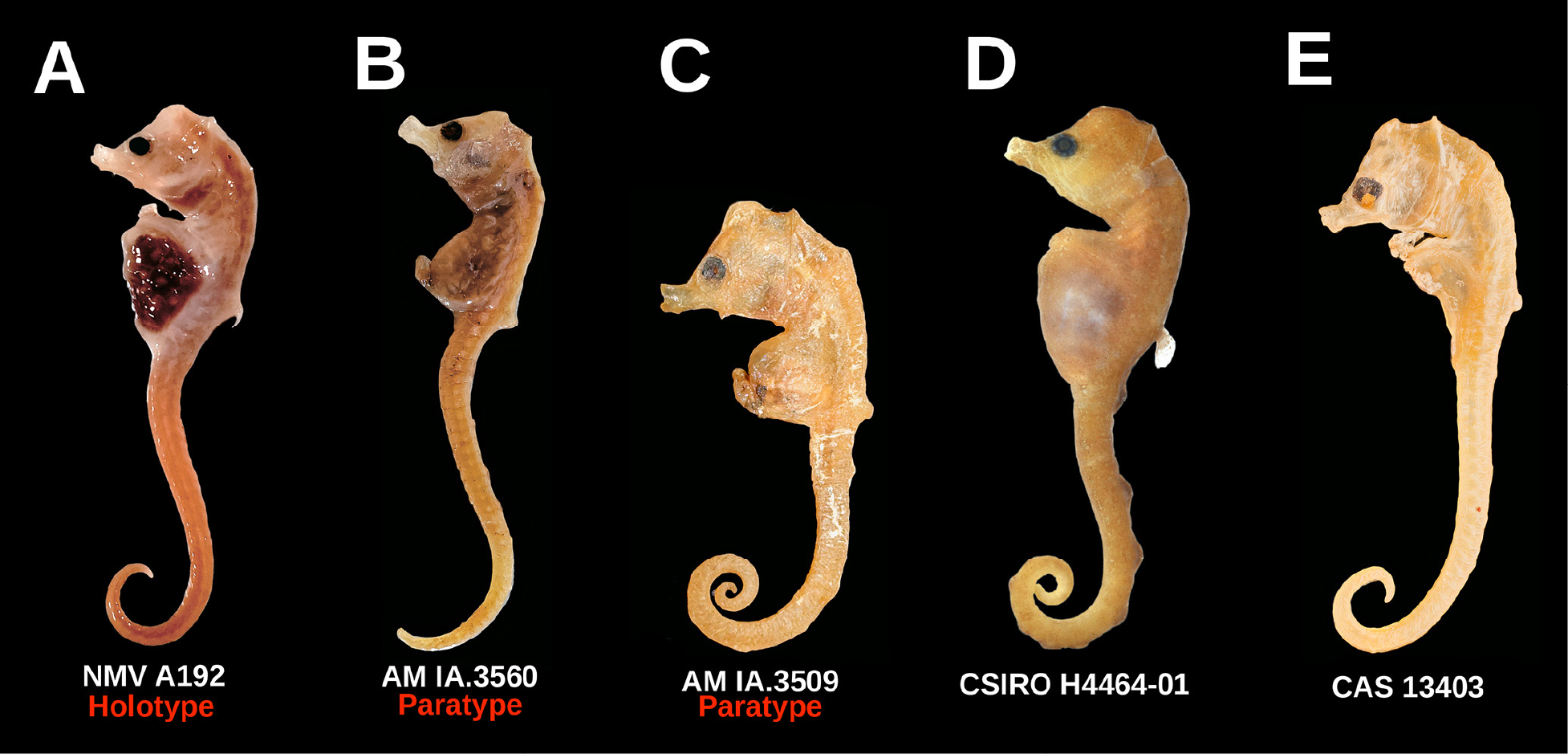
Preserved specimens of Australyichthys minotaur

Three species are recognised. The proposed common names combine a descriptor with "sea muppet".

- Australyichthys aegis (helmethead sea Muppet) Short, Foster & Gomon, 2026. Known only from the male holotype, from the entrance to Spencer Gulf, South Australia. It is the sole ethanol-preserved specimen, which provided the DNA used to place the genus phylogenetically. Distinguished by sharply triangular, laterally compressed dorsal lobes, a strongly domed head, and the most derived expression of the ventral trunk complex, in which the proximally fused PVE partly enclose the MAP within a tunnel-like channel. The epithet aegis (Latinised from Greek aigis, the protective shield of Greek mythology) alludes to the domed head.
- Australyichthys minotaur (bullneck sea Muppet) (Gomon, 1997). The type species, from southeastern Australia (New South Wales and Victoria). The only species that retains a dorsal fin (seven rays on five pterygiophores, restricted to the first tail ring) and the only one known from both sexes. Recorded from the holotype, two paratypes, and additional non-type specimens, chiefly from off Eden, New South Wales.
- Australyichthys paradoxus (paradoxical sea Muppet) (Foster & Gomon, 2010). From southwestern Australia (off Esperance, Western Australia), known only from the female holotype. Distinguished by broad, quadrate dorsal dermal lobes and the absence of a dorsal fin.

== Distribution and habitat ==
Australyichthys is the first syngnathid genus known exclusively from the temperate mesophotic zone of southern Australia. Its records span more than 2,500 km (1,600 mi) of coastline, extending from New South Wales and Victoria in the southeast westward to Esperance, Western Australia, with A. aegis occurring near the midpoint at Spencer Gulf, South Australia. All specimens were collected at depths between approximately 50–124 m (164–407 ft).

The temperate mesophotic zone is among the least-surveyed components of Australia's marine environment. Whereas most southern Australian syngnathids occupy shallow, macroalgae- and seagrass-dominated habitats, the mesophotic shelf supports structurally complex biogenic habitats, including sponge gardens, bryozoan colonies, and coral-like assemblages. The specimens come from depths and regions where such habitats occur, and the cryptic form of the genus is consistent with life among this structure. No individual has been observed alive, and specific habitat associations remain undocumented.

== Ecology ==
CT imaging of the A. paradoxus holotype showed dense, calcified fragments in the gut, identified as crustacean remains and interpreted by the authors as evidence of a diet of small benthic or planktonic invertebrates. A dorsal fin is present in A. minotaur but absent in the other two species. The authors associate this reduction with a sedentary, camouflage-dependent habit and note that the small number of known specimens limits further inference.

== Phylogeny ==
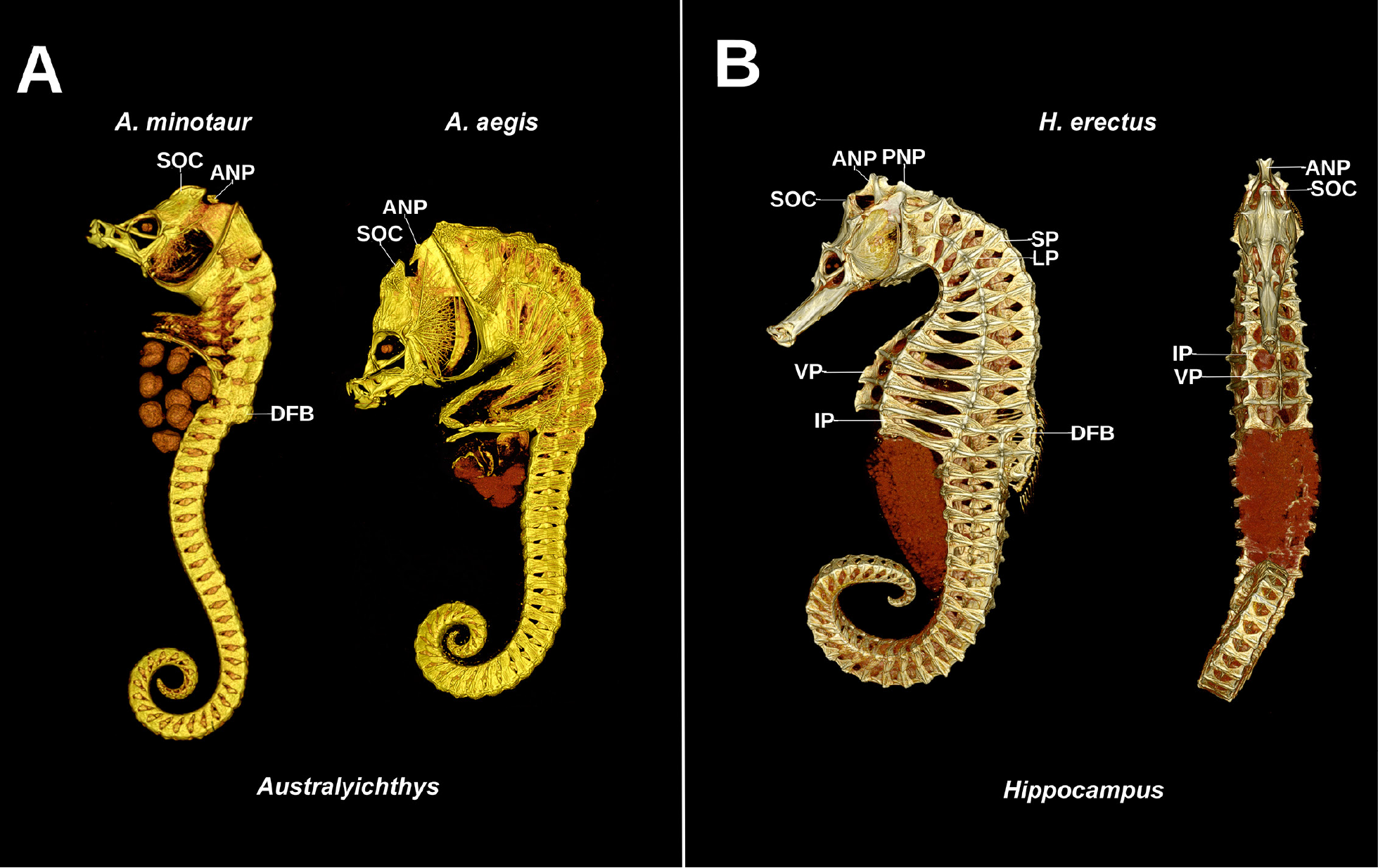
Comparison of the skeletons of A. minotaur and A. aegis with Hippocampus erectus

The phylogenetic analysis by Short et al. (2026), based on a dataset of 23 syngnathid species and 200 loci, recovered Australyichthys within the tribe Haliichthyini, a diverse assemblage of predominantly Indo-Pacific pipefishes that also includes the Pacific pygmy pipehorses (Idiotropiscis, Acentronura, and Cylix). Haliichthyini was first identified as a clade in the molecular phylogenies of Hamilton et al. (2017) and Stiller et al. (2022). Within Haliichthyini, the genus is recovered as the sister lineage to a clade comprising Filicampus tigris, Trachyrhamphus, Halicampus grayi, and Haliichthys taeniophorus. Haliichthyini is in turn recovered as the sister group of Hippocampini, the tribe containing the true seahorses (Hippocampus). The results of their maximum likelihood tree are displayed in the cladogram below:

- Syngnathinae
  - - Corythoichthys
    - Phycodurus
  - - - - Hippichthys
        - Leptonotus
      - - Syngnathus
        - - Amphelikturus
          - Micrognathus
    - - Hippocampini
        - Halicampus
        - Hippocampus
      - Haliichthyini
        - - Acentronura
          - Idiotropiscis
        - - Lissocampus
          - - Australyichthys
            - - Haliichthys
              - - Halicampus
                - - Filicampus
                  - Trachyrhamphus

This placement, distant from Hippocampus, indicates that the hippocampiform body plan of Australyichthys (ventrally angled head, prehensile tail, enclosed male pouch) arose by convergent evolution rather than through shared ancestry with the seahorses. The same character combination occurs independently in the Indo-Pacific pygmy pipehorses and in the western Atlantic genus Amphelikturus dendriticus. This body form has arisen repeatedly within the family. The enlarged, consolidated anal pterygiophores of Australyichthys similarly resemble those of Acentronura and Hippocampus. The describing authors interpret this resemblance as functional convergence associated with the combination of a prehensile tail and enclosed brooding.

== Conservation ==
The genus is known solely from a small series of historical museum specimens and has never been documented alive, the most recent confirmed collection dating to February 2006. The describing authors interpret the paucity of records as reflecting limited sampling of temperate mesophotic habitats rather than population decline. Under the "lost species" framework of Long and Rodríguez (2022), which proposes a decade without confirmed records in the wild as a benchmark, all three species qualify as lost. The authors extend this concept to the generic level in recognising Australyichthys as a "lost genus". Because available data are insufficient to assess population size, trend, or geographic range, the genus is regarded as Data Deficient pending targeted, non-extractive surveys of the southern Australian mesophotic zone.
