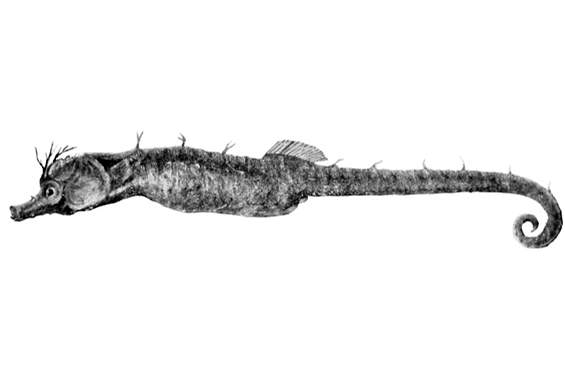
- Idiotropiscis australe

Scientific classification
- Kingdom: Animalia
- Phylum: Chordata
- Class: Actinopterygii
- Division: Teleostei
- Order: Syngnathiformes
- Family: Syngnathidae
- Subfamily: Syngnathinae
- Tribe: Hippocampini; Bonaparte, 1835

Genera
- Between 2 and 10 (see text)

= Hippocampini =

Hippocampini Temporal range: Middle Miocene–present

Subfamily of fishes

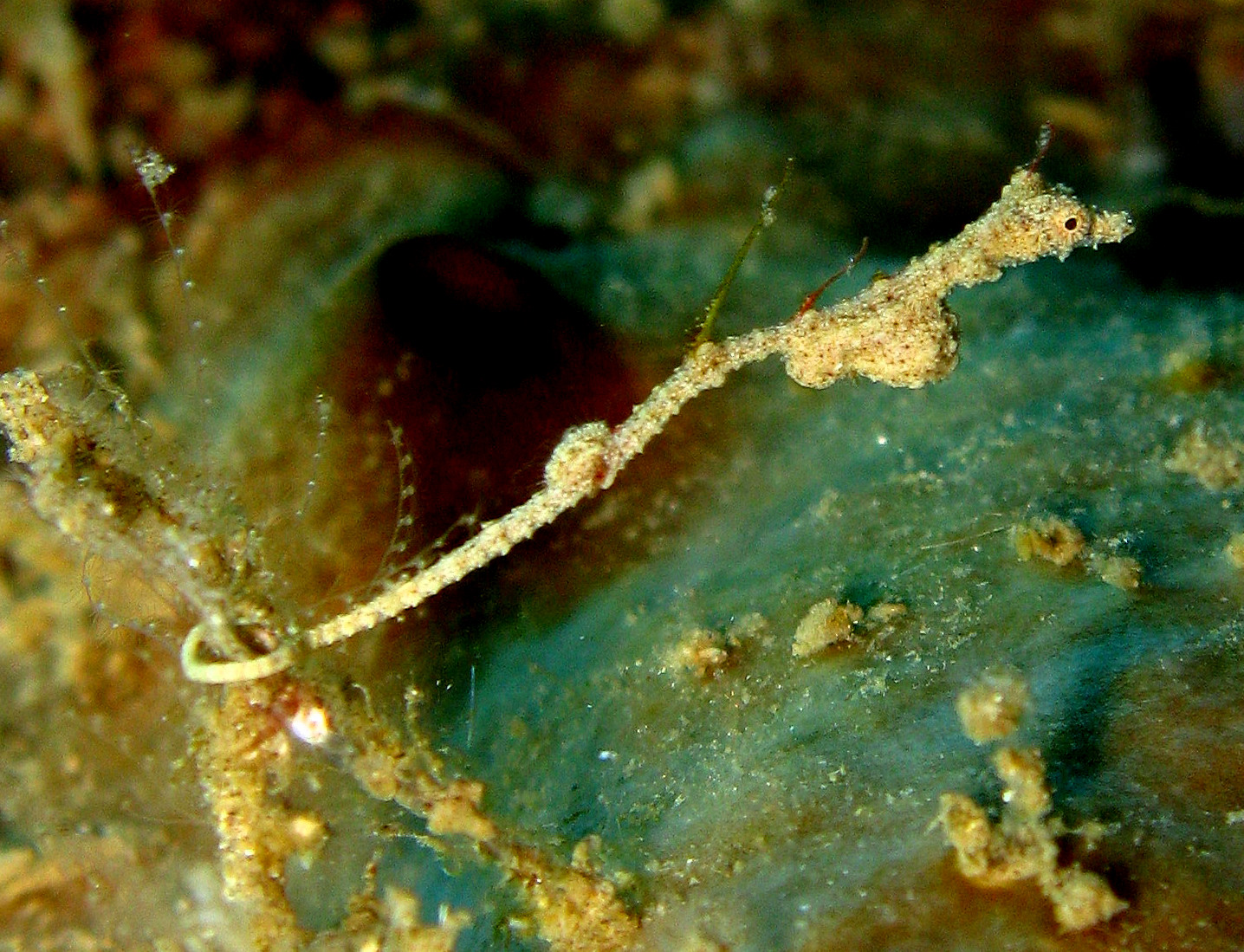
Kyonemichthys rumengani, one of several small syngnathids discovered in the West Pacific in recent years

The Hippocampini are a tribe of small marine fishes in the subfamily Syngnathinae of the family Syngnathidae. Depending on the classification system used, it comprises either seahorses and pygmy pipehorses, or only seahorses.

== Etymology ==
The subfamily Hippocampinae is named after the seahorse genus Hippocampus, which is derived from the Ancient Greek ἱππόκαμπος (hippokampos), a compound of ἵππος, "horse" and κάμπος, "sea monster". The morphologically intermediate nature of pygmy pipehorses is reflected in the name "pipehorse", a combination of the first syllable of "pipefish" and the second syllable of "seahorse". "Pygmy" is added to distinguish them from the larger pipehorses of the genus Solegnathus, which are distant relatives of the pygmy pipehorses. Other common names that have been applied to pygmy pipehorses include "bastard seahorse", "little pipehorse" and "pygmy pipedragon".

== Taxonomy ==
=== Genera ===
Based on Stiller et al (2022):

- Hippocampus Rafinesque, 1810
- Halicampus Kaup, 1856

==== Alternative taxonomy ====
Brownstein et al (2023) include the pygmy pipehorses within the tribe. Stiller et al instead treated these genera as a separate tribe sister to the Hippocampini, within the tribe Haliichthyini.

- Acentronura Kaup, 1853
- Cylix Short & Trnski, 2021 (Manaia pygmy pipehorse)
- Filicampus Whitley, 1948
- Haliichthys Gray, 1859
- †Hippotropiscis Žalohar & Hitij, 2012 (known only from Miocene fossils)
- Idiotropiscis Whitley, 1947
- Lissocampus Waite & Hale, 1921
- Trachyrhamphus Kaup, 1853

Other "pipehorses", such as Amphelikturus are now placed in the tribe Syngnathini, having convergently evolved in the "pipehorse" morphology. The taxonomy of other pipehorses such as Kyonemichthys remains uncertain.

=== Systematics ===
In the past, due to the morphologically intermediate nature of the pygmy pipehorses between pipefishes and seahorses, the taxonomic placement of this group (then known as the subfamily Hippocampinae) was contentious, and three different classifications were proposed for it:

- Hippocampinae comprises both seahorses and pygmy pipehorses

Phylogenetic analyses based on five nuclear genetic loci recovered the genera Hippocampus and Idiotropiscis as sister taxa, suggesting that seahorses and pygmy pipehorses are a monophyletic group and hence share a common evolutionary origin. However, the same phylogeny indicates that if the subfamily Hippocampinae is accepted as valid, then the pipefish subfamily Syngnathinae is paraphyletic, because the former is not a sister group of the latter, but is nested within it.

- Hippocampinae includes only seahorses, pygmy pipehorses are placed into the pipefish subfamily Syngnathinae

This classification system disregards both genetic data and the morphological characters shared by seahorses and pygmy pipehorses. As seahorses have a sister taxon relationship with Idiotropiscis, and other pygmy pipehorse genera are likely basal to this group (given their more pipefish-like appearance), this classification would also make the Syngnathinae paraphyletic.

- Hippocampinae includes only seahorses, pygmy pipehorses are placed into own subfamily

This classification places all pygmy pipehorses into the subfamily Acentronurinae. Based on the nuclear DNA phylogeny, the exclusion of the seahorses from this group likely makes it paraphyletic. However, such a placement is partially supported by an alternative molecular phylogeny that is based on a combination of nuclear and mitochondrial markers and that recovered a group comprising pygmy pipehorses and several pipefishes as a sister lineage of Hippocampus.

As the genus Hippocampus consists of two morphologically distinct forms, it has been suggested that it should be split into two distinct genera, Hippocampus and a new genus comprising the pygmy seahorses. Pygmy seahorses have a single gill opening on the back of the head (instead of two on the sides as in normal seahorses), and the males brood their young inside their trunk, instead of in a pouch on the tail. A molecular phylogeny confirms that the pygmy seahorses are a monophyletic sister lineage of all other seahorses.

A high-resolution 2022 study sampling across all syngnathids refuted the former taxonomic treatment of Hippocampinae as its own subfamily, instead finding it to be deeply nested within the subfamily Syngnathinae, the tail-brooding pipefishes. Due to this, Hippocampinae is no longer recognized as a distinct subfamily by Eschmeyer's Catalog of Fishes. In addition, the pipefish genus Halicampus was found to be the closest relative of Hippocampus. These two genera were placed in the tribe Hippocampini, sister to the tribe Halliichthyini, containing the pygmy pipehorses. Brownstein et al (2023) found a similar taxonomy, but chose to retain the pygmy pipehorses within an expanded Hippocampini.

=== Evolution and fossil record ===
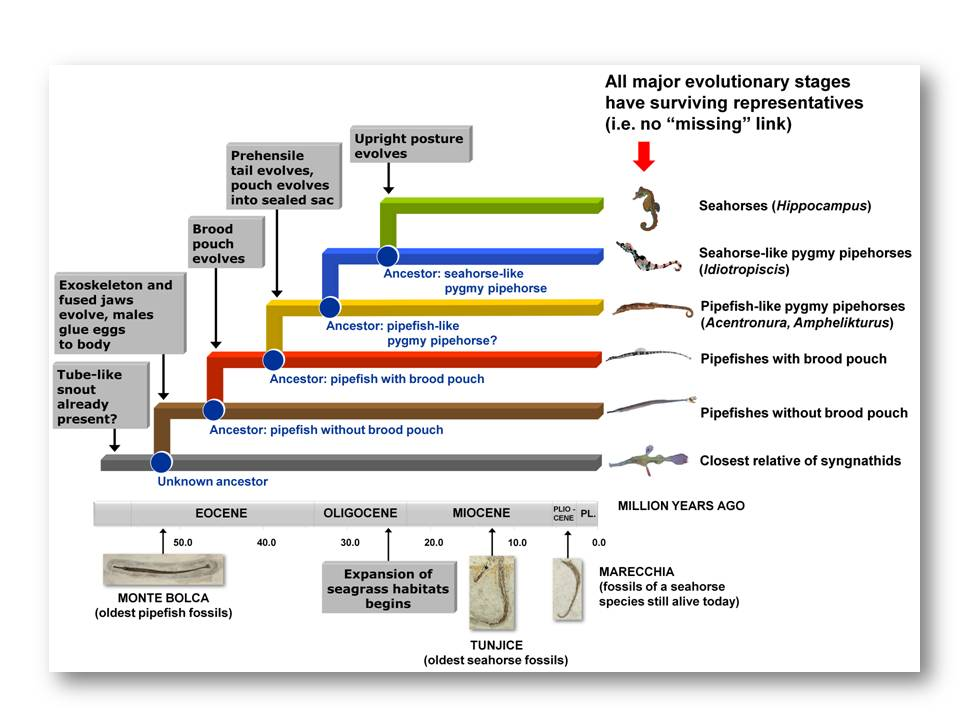
A simplified reconstruction of the evolution of seahorses from a pipefish-like ancestor based on a combination of genetic data, fossils and the body structure of living species. Although some species have become extinct, the major stages of evolution are still represented in living species. The timing of only two evolutionary events is known with some certainty: the evolution of the first pipefishes and the evolution of seahorses. The placement of the pipefish-like pygmy pipehorses has yet to be confirmed by genetic data.

The morphology of pygmy pipehorses suggests that they are an evolutionary link between pipefishes and seahorses, and that seahorses are upright-swimming pygmy pipehorses. Molecular dating indicates that Hippocampus and Idiotropiscis diverged from a common ancestor during the Late Oligocene. During this time, tectonic events in the Indo-West Pacific resulted in the formation of shallow-water areas, which considerably changed marine habitats in this region. Particularly important was the establishment of vast seagrass meadows where there had previously been deeper water. This has led to speculation that the earliest seahorses managed to establish themselves as a new species because, unlike pygmy pipehorses, they were selectively favoured in such habitats. Not only can seahorses manoeuver exceptionally well in dense seagrass meadows, but the upright seagrass blades would have provided camouflage for their bodies and in that way improved their ability to ambush prey and avoid detection by predators. An alternative explanation for the evolution from pygmy pipehorse to seahorse is based on the finding that a vertically bent head is more efficient in capturing prey because it increases the animal's strike distance, which is considered particularly useful in tail-attached sit-and-wait predators. In that case, the evolution of an upright posture would merely be a means of maximising the angle between head and abdominal axis.

There is as yet no fossil evidence for the evolution of seahorses from a pygmy pipehorse ancestor, as the fossil record of both groups is very sparse. The only pygmy pipehorse species of which fossils have been found (Hippotropiscis frenki) lived in the Central Paratethys Sea (the modern-day Tunjice Hills of Slovenia, north of the Mediterranean Sea) during the Middle Miocene, i.e. during a time when seahorses had already evolved. In fact, the oldest known seahorse species, Hippocampus sarmaticus and H. slovenicus, were found at the same site. Independent geological confirmation of the genetic data would require finding a fossil site from the Oligocene in which seahorse-like pygmy pipehorses are present, but seahorses are not. Given the fact that Idiotropiscis is endemic to temperate Australia and the most basal seahorse lineages occur in Australia and the tropical West Pacific, these regions are the most likely candidates for such a site.

== Description ==
All seahorse and pygmy pipehorse species have a prehensile tail (a character shared with some other syngnathids), a fully enclosed brood pouch, a short head and snout angled ventrally from the abdominal axis, and no caudal fin. The species in the genera Acentronura, Amphelikturus and Kyonemichtys resemble pipefishes, which explains why pygmy pipehorses are sometimes grouped in the pipefish subfamily Syngnathinae. The species of Idiotropiscis are more seahorse-like in appearance in having a deeper body and discontinuous superior trunk and tail ridges. The main differences between this pygmy pipehorse genus and the seahorses is that the latter have an upright posture, and the angle of their head relative to the abdominal axis is greater.

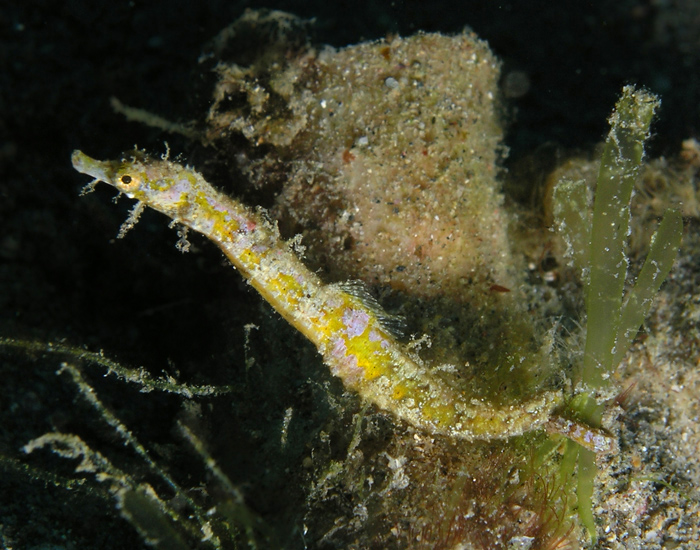
Acentronura breviperula, a species of pygmy pipehorse that looks like a short pipefish

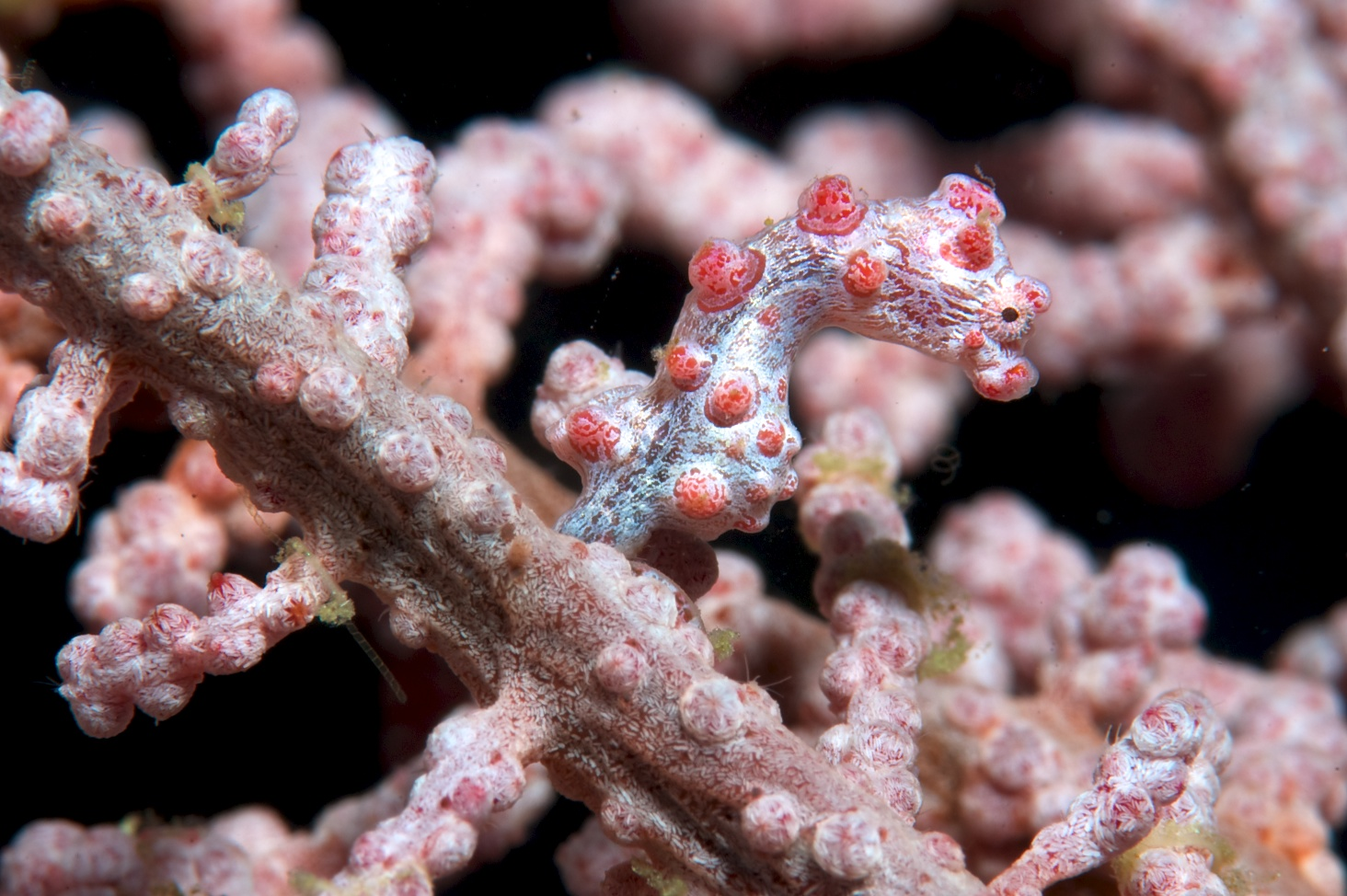
The pygmy seahorse Hippocampus bargibanti

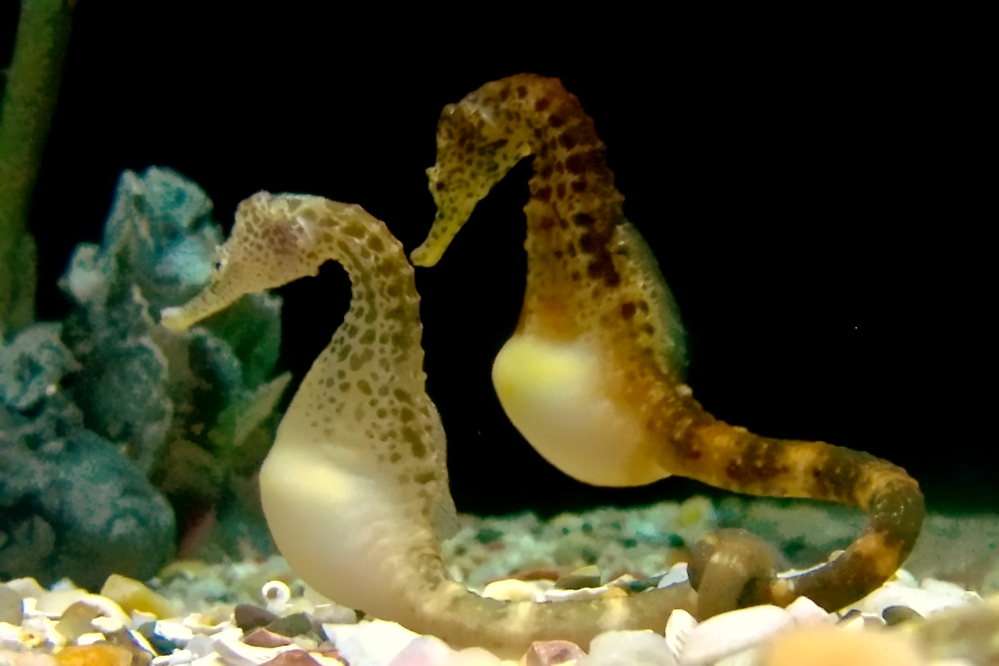
The Australian potbelly seahorse, Hippocampus abdominalis, the largest species in the subfamily Hippocampinae.
