= Tunjice Hills seahorse =

Tunjice Hills seahorse can refer to any of the two fossil species of seahorse found in the Early Miocene-aged marine strata in the Tunjice Hills area of Western Slovenia:

- Hippocampus sarmaticus
- Hippocampus slovenicus
