= Tunjiška Mlaka =

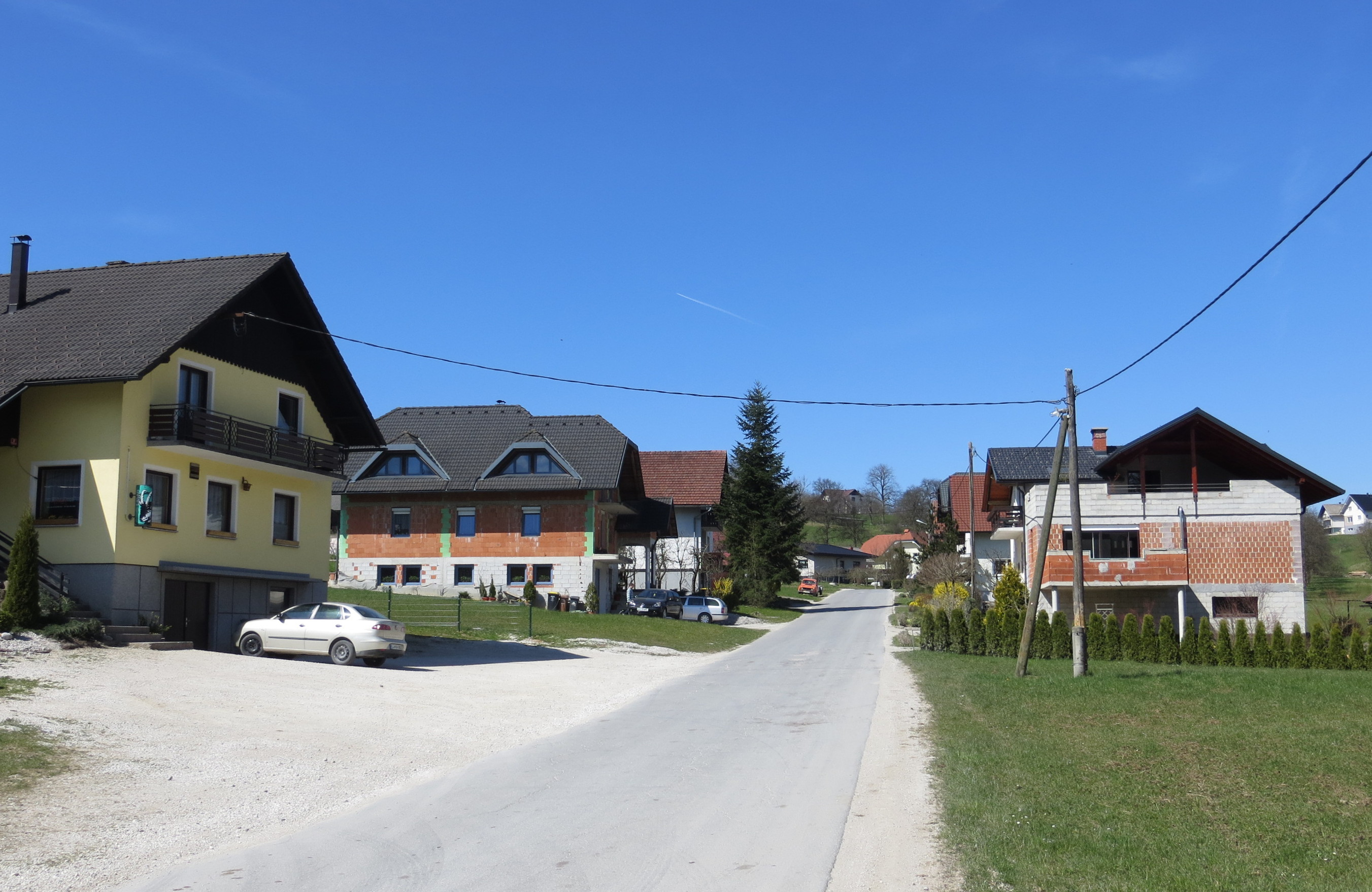

- Location in Slovenia
- Coordinates: 46°14′4.02″N 14°35′9.17″E
- Country: Slovenia
- Traditional region: Upper Carniola
- Statistical region: Central Slovenia
- Municipality: Kamnik

Area
  - Total: 1.6 km^{2} (0.62 sq mi)
- Elevation: 375.3 m (1,231 ft)

Population (2015)
  - Total: 305
  - Density: 189/km^{2} (490/sq mi)

Tunjiška Mlaka (pronounced [ˈtuːnjiʃka ˈmlaːka]) is a dispersed settlement next to Tunjice in the Tunjice Hills (Slovene: Tunjiško gričevje) west of the town of Kamnik in Upper Carniola region of Slovenia.
