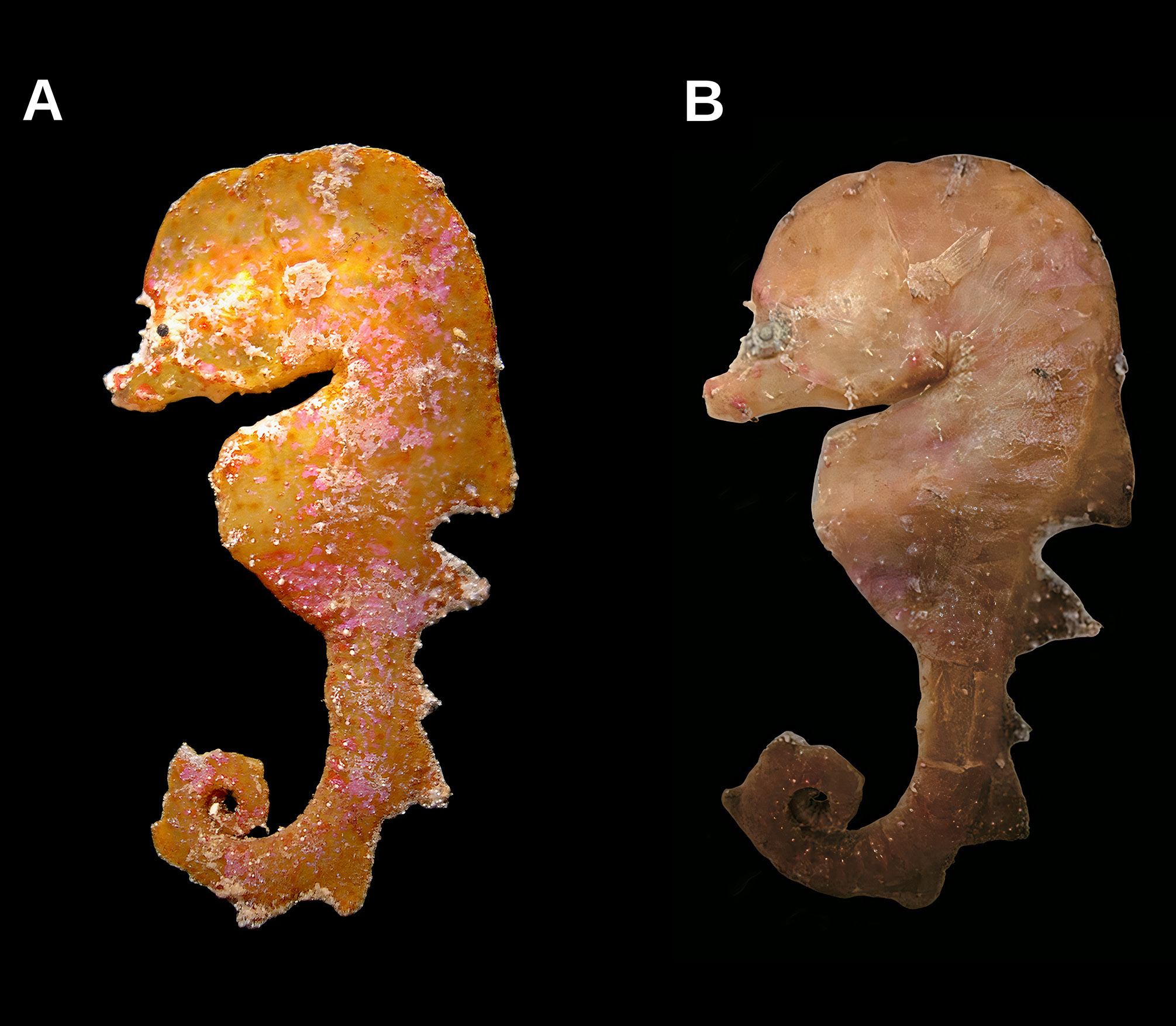
- Holotype specimen as collected (A) and in preservative, with faded colors (B)

Scientific classification
- Kingdom: Animalia
- Phylum: Chordata
- Class: Actinopterygii
- Division: Teleostei
- Order: Syngnathiformes
- Family: Syngnathidae
- Tribe: Haliichthyini
- Genus: Australyichthys
- Species: A. aegis

Binomial name
- Australyichthys aegis Foster & Gomon in Short et al., 2026
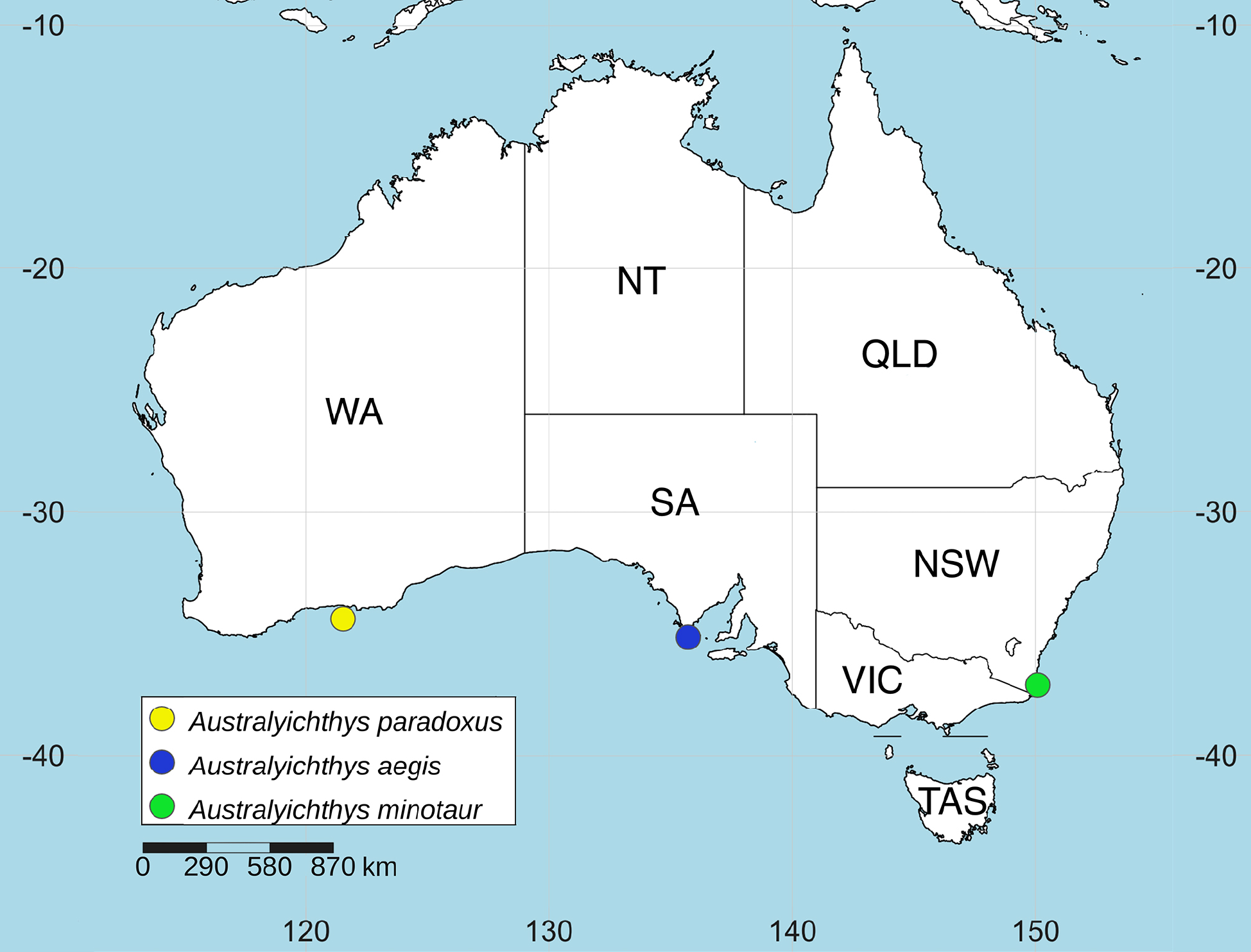
- Type locality [●] in South Australia

= Helmethead sea Muppet =

Genus of ray-finned fish

The helmethead sea Muppet (Australyichthys aegis) is a species of ray-finned fish in the sea Muppet genus Australyichthys (family Syngnathidae). Like other members of this genus, it has a superficially seahorse-like morphology, a result of convergent evolution of Australyichthys species on members of the genus Hippocampus. It is known from a single specimen incidentally collected by dredging activity off the coast of South Australia. The species has not been recorded since, in part because it occupies an understudied mesophotic (low light) habitat.

The helmeted sea Muppet is characterized by sharply triangular, flattened dorsal dermal lobes arranged in a midline row along the trunk and tail. The head is proportionally large, with an inflated, dome-like shape. It has a fleshy body without any visible bony segmentation. In life, it has a bright orange to pinkish-orange coloration, mottled with patches of pale yellow, pink, and white. It has a curled, prehensile tail, as in seahorses, which has a similar coloration to the rest of the body.

== Etymology ==
The specific name, aegis, is derived from the protective shield of the same name in Greek mythology, used in analogy to the large domed head of this species. This name was chosen to parallel the name of its congener Australyichthys minotaur, which is also derived from Greek myth.
