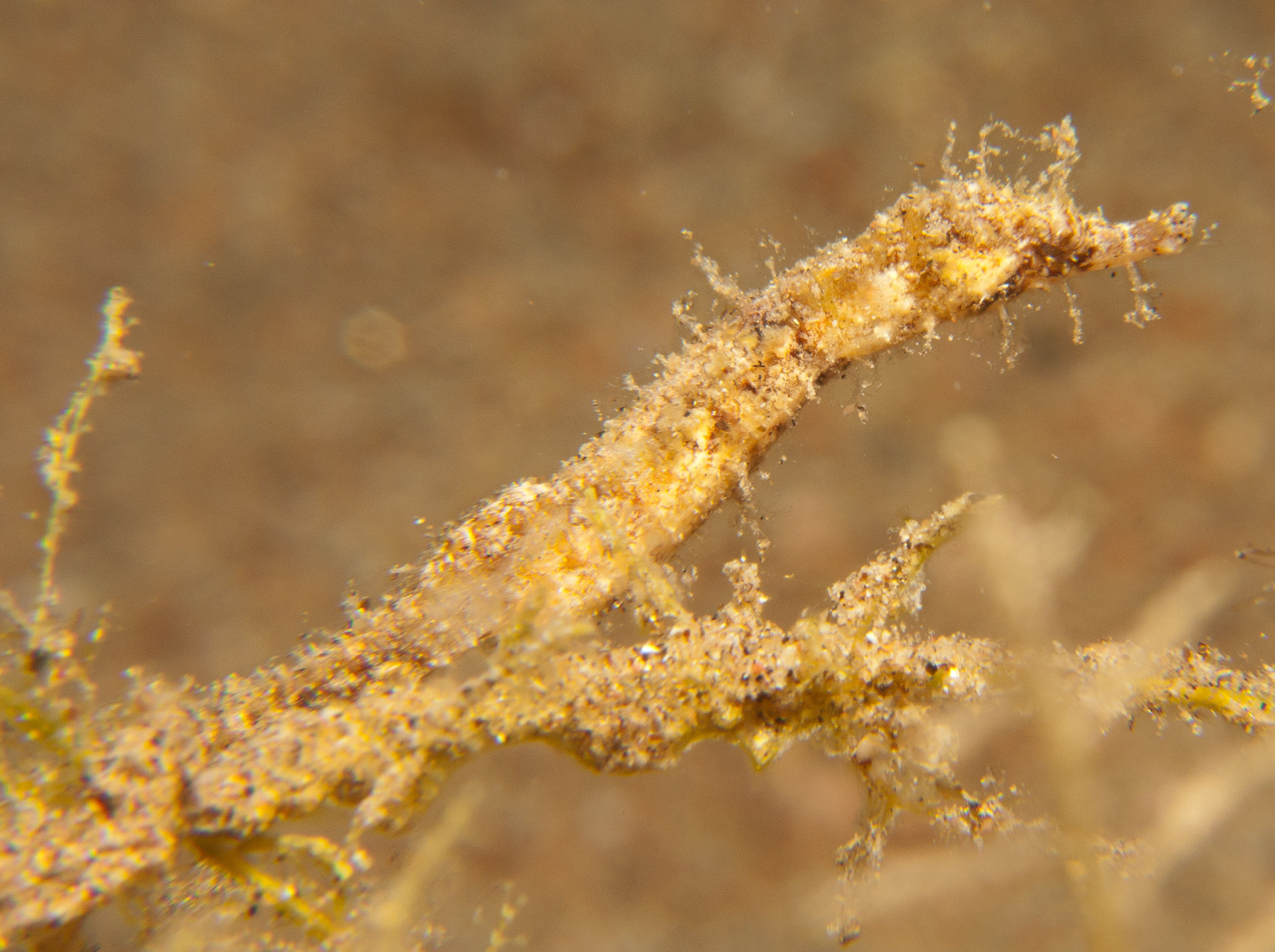

Conservation status
- Least Concern (IUCN 3.1)

Scientific classification
- Kingdom: Animalia
- Phylum: Chordata
- Class: Actinopterygii
- Order: Syngnathiformes
- Family: Syngnathidae
- Genus: Acentronura
- Species: A. tentaculata

Binomial name
- Acentronura tentaculata Günther, 1870

Synonyms
- Syngnathoides algensis Fourmanoir, 1955; Acentronura mossambica J. L. B. Smith, 1963

= Acentronura tentaculata =

Species of fish

Acentronura tentaculata, the shortpouch pygmy pipehorse , northern little pipehorse, or dwarf pipehorse, is a species of pygmy pipehorse from the family Syngnathidae. The status of this species is debated and Acentronura breviperula is considered to be subsumed within this species by some authorities. The exact distribution of this species may be as wide as the western Indo-Pacific region from East Africa to New Caledonia and the northern Great Barrier Reef. Other authorities however describe Acentronura tentaculata as being endemic to the Red Sea.
