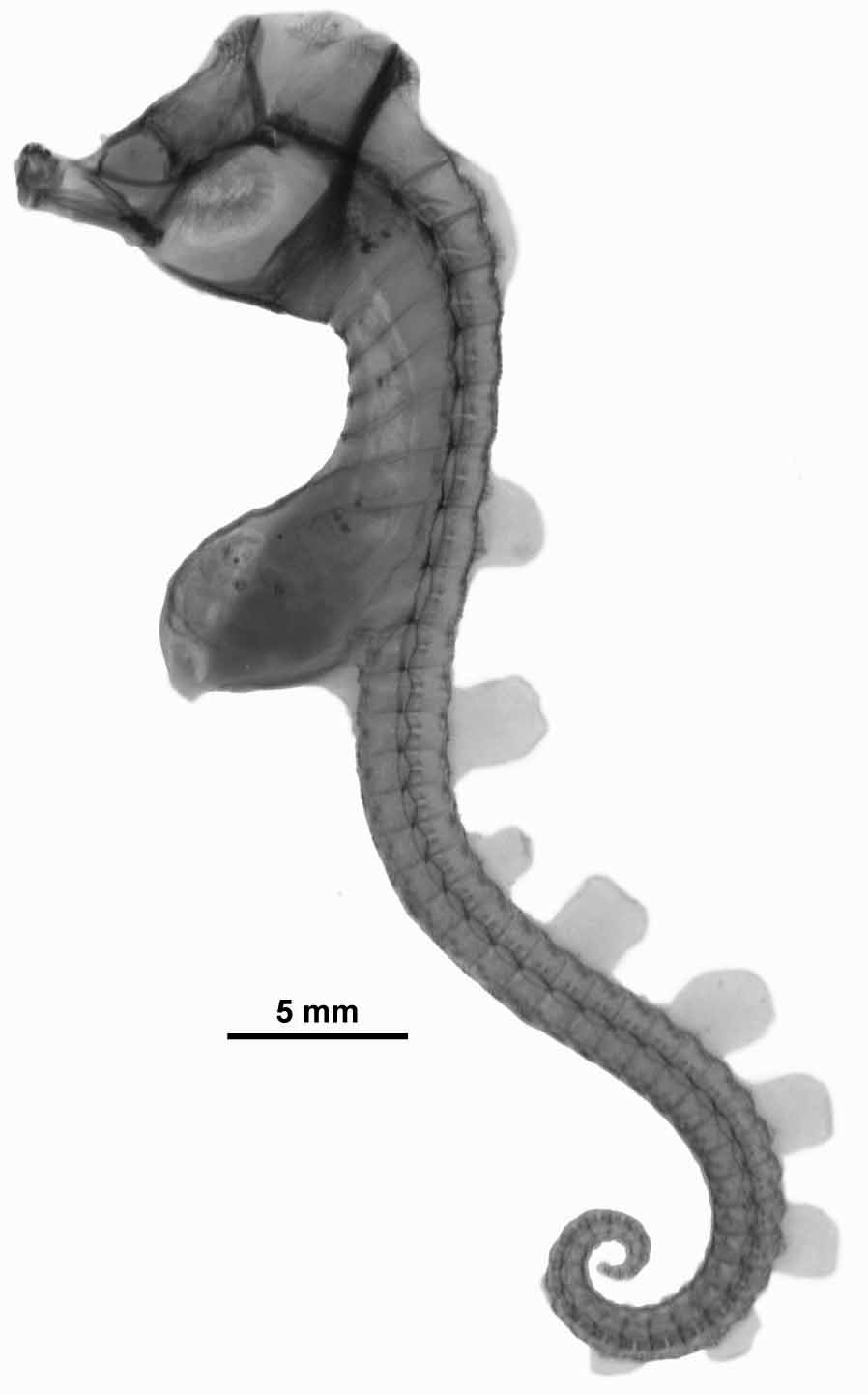
- Radiograph of Australyichthys paradoxus

Conservation status
- Data Deficient (IUCN 3.1)
- CITES Appendix II

Scientific classification
- Kingdom: Animalia
- Phylum: Chordata
- Class: Actinopterygii
- Division: Teleostei
- Order: Syngnathiformes
- Family: Syngnathidae
- Genus: Australyichthys
- Species: A. paradoxus

Binomial name
- Australyichthys paradoxus (Foster & Gomon, 2010)

Synonyms
- Hippocampus paradoxus Foster & Gomon, 2010

= Paradoxical sea Muppet =

Species of fish

The paradoxical sea Muppet (Australyichthys paradoxus) is a small seahorse-like fish in the genus Australyichthys. The only known specimen was captured in 1995 and remained unnoticed in a museum until 2006. Originally placed under the genus Hippocampus, the species was moved to its current genus in 2026.

== Description ==
The species name paradoxus was given because the seahorse is very different from all of the other members of genus Hippocampus; the seahorse is paradoxical. Like all seahorses, this species is sexually dimorphic. It is theorized that the brood pouch is attached on the ventral side of the seahorse, near the top of the tail and connecting to the seahorse's chest. This theory is based on its similarity to Australyichthys minotaur, but has not been confirmed because a male specimen has not been collected.

The only known specimen is a female, and has a vertical height of 6.5 cm (2.6 in). This species has 8 trunk rings and 11 pectoral fin rays. A series of lobes that resemble small fins make up the majority of this fish's body. The lobes start near the midline of the seahorse's trunk and continue to the end of the seahorse's tail. The first lobe does resemble a small dorsal fin, but it is not one. Unlike all of the other members of its genus, this species of seahorse lacks a dorsal fin.

The holotype is yellow-cream in color, and it is covered with small brown spots. It is possible that the color of the specimen has changed while the body was preserved in formaldehyde, so the actual color of this animal in the wild is unknown.

== Distribution ==
The holotype was discovered south-west of Esperance, Western Australia, on the western periphery of the Great Australian Bight. The specimen was collected near 34°12′S 121°32′E.

== Habitat ==
This species was collected at a depth near 102 m (335 ft). The collection site was in the benthic zone, at the bottom of the ocean, near the sandy substrate. The collection site was full of different types of bryozoans, lace corals and sponges. Waters at the collection site are relatively warm.
