= Kylix (disambiguation) =

A kylix or cylix is a type of drinking cup used in ancient Greece

Kylix may also refer to:

- Kylix (gastropod), a genus of snails in the family Drilliidae
- Cylix (fish), a genus of pipefish
- Borland Kylix, a programming tool
