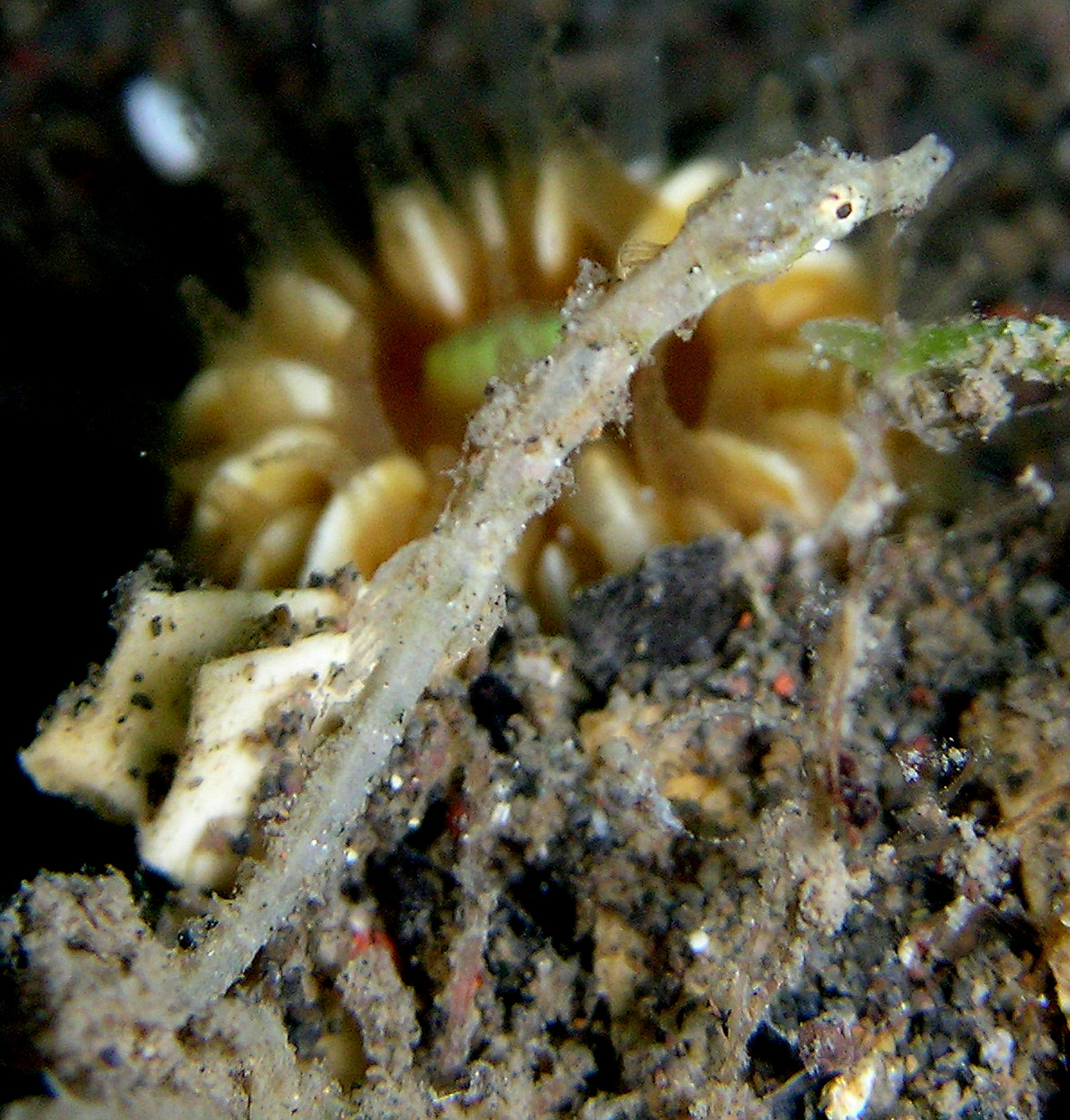

Scientific classification
- Kingdom: Animalia
- Phylum: Chordata
- Class: Actinopterygii
- Order: Syngnathiformes
- Family: Syngnathidae
- Genus: Acentronura
- Species: A. breviperula

Binomial name
- Acentronura breviperula Fraser-Brunner & Whitley, 1949

= Acentronura breviperula =

Species of fish

Acentronura breviperula, also known as the shortpouch pygmy pipehorse, dwarf pipehorse and northern little pipehorse, is a species of pygmy pipehorse, a member of the family Syngnathidae, the seahorses and pipefishes. It occurs in the Indo-Pacific region from the eastern Andaman Sea, through the Malay Archipelago to the Western Pacific as far east as New Guinea and the northern Great Barrier Reef.

It is a small, drab-coloured pipehorse which is very well camouflaged among sandy and silty habitats, although it is usually found on substrates of coral rubble or in areas of sparse algal growth. It has a prehensile tail similar to that of a seahorse but it lacks an angled head and swims with its body held in a horizontal position. It is normally recorded in pairs and they typically use their prehensile tails to grip onto pieces of algae or debris. It is a carnivorous species which feeds on small invertebrates. Like other syngnathids it is ovoviviparous and the males hold the developing eggs in a brood pouch located on the underside of its body. It is found at depths from 2–40 metres (6.6–131.2 ft). They are sexually dimorphic, the females resemble pipefish but the males have large bellies and bear more resemblance to sea horses. They grow to a maximum length of 6 centimetres (2.4 in).

A breviperula was previously thought to be a synonym of Acentronura tentaculata but is now considered to be a valid species with A. tenticulata restricted to the Red Sea. In Australia A. berviperula is a listed Marine Species under the Environment Protection and Biodiversity Conservation Act 1999.
