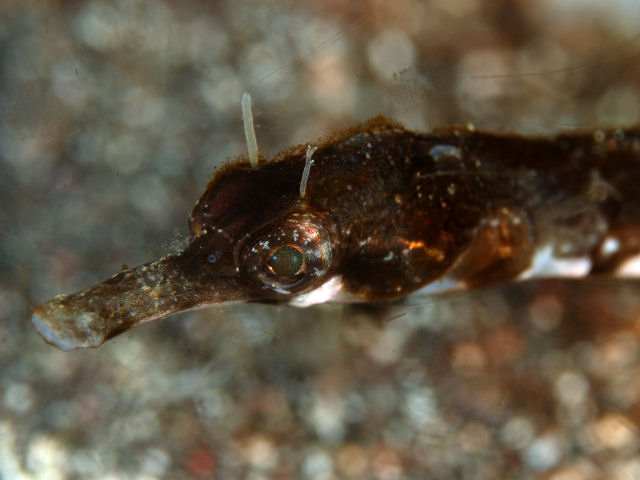
- Trachyrhamphus serratus

Conservation status
- Least Concern (IUCN 3.1)

Scientific classification
- Kingdom: Animalia
- Phylum: Chordata
- Class: Actinopterygii
- Division: Teleostei
- Order: Syngnathiformes
- Family: Syngnathidae
- Genus: Trachyrhamphus
- Species: T. serratus

Binomial name
- Trachyrhamphus serratus Temminck & Schlegel 1850

= Trachyrhamphus serratus =

Crested pipefish

Species of fish

Trachyrhamphus serratus, also known as the crested pipefish or saw pipefish, is a species of marine fish belonging to the family Syngnathidae. They can be found in Sargassum beds, mud, and sandy habitats from Southern India to South Korea and Japan. This species is observed at depths ranging from 15 to 100 meters.
