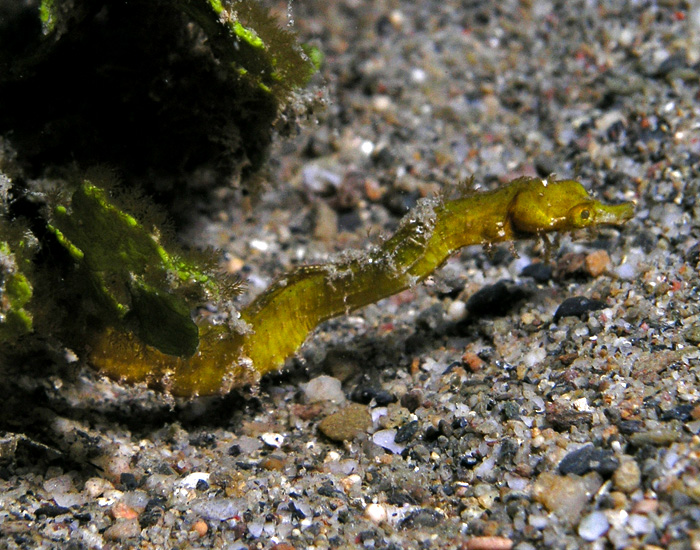
- Shortpouch pygmy pipehorse (A. tentaculata)

Scientific classification
- Kingdom: Animalia
- Phylum: Chordata
- Class: Actinopterygii
- Division: Teleostei
- Order: Syngnathiformes
- Family: Syngnathidae
- Subfamily: Syngnathinae
- Genus: Acentronura; Kaup, 1853

Type species
- Hippocampus gracilissimus Temminck & Schlegel 1850

Synonyms
- Atelurus Duméril, 1870

= Acentronura =

Genus of fishes

Acentronura is a genus of pygmy pipehorse native to the Indian and Pacific oceans. The name is derived from the Greek ακεντρονουρα, or a-kentron-oura, and refers to the lack of a sting on the tail.

== Species ==
There are currently three recognized species in this genus, several previous members having been moved to the genera Amphelikturus and Idiotropiscis:

- Acentronura breviperula Fraser-Brunner & Whitley, 1949 (Dwarf pipehorse)
- Acentronura gracilissima (Temminck & Schlegel, 1850) (Bastard seahorse)
- Acentronura tentaculata (Günther, 1870) (Shortpouch pygmy pipehorse)

== Distribution ==
Acentronura species are mainly found in shallow tropical and subtropical waters of the Indo-west Pacific and the Red Sea. When fully grown they vary from 5 to 8 centimetres (2.0 to 3.1 in) in length, with the average maximal size being about 6.3 centimetres (2.5 in). They are small, secretive, and very well camouflaged, and are therefore quite rarely seen; for this reason, some species may be more common than they appear. Adults are usually found in the demersal region just above the substrate on the continental shelf, usually in water less than 20 metres (66 ft) deep. Juveniles are similar in form to the adults, but are pelagic and therefore may be found deeper than this.

== Biology ==
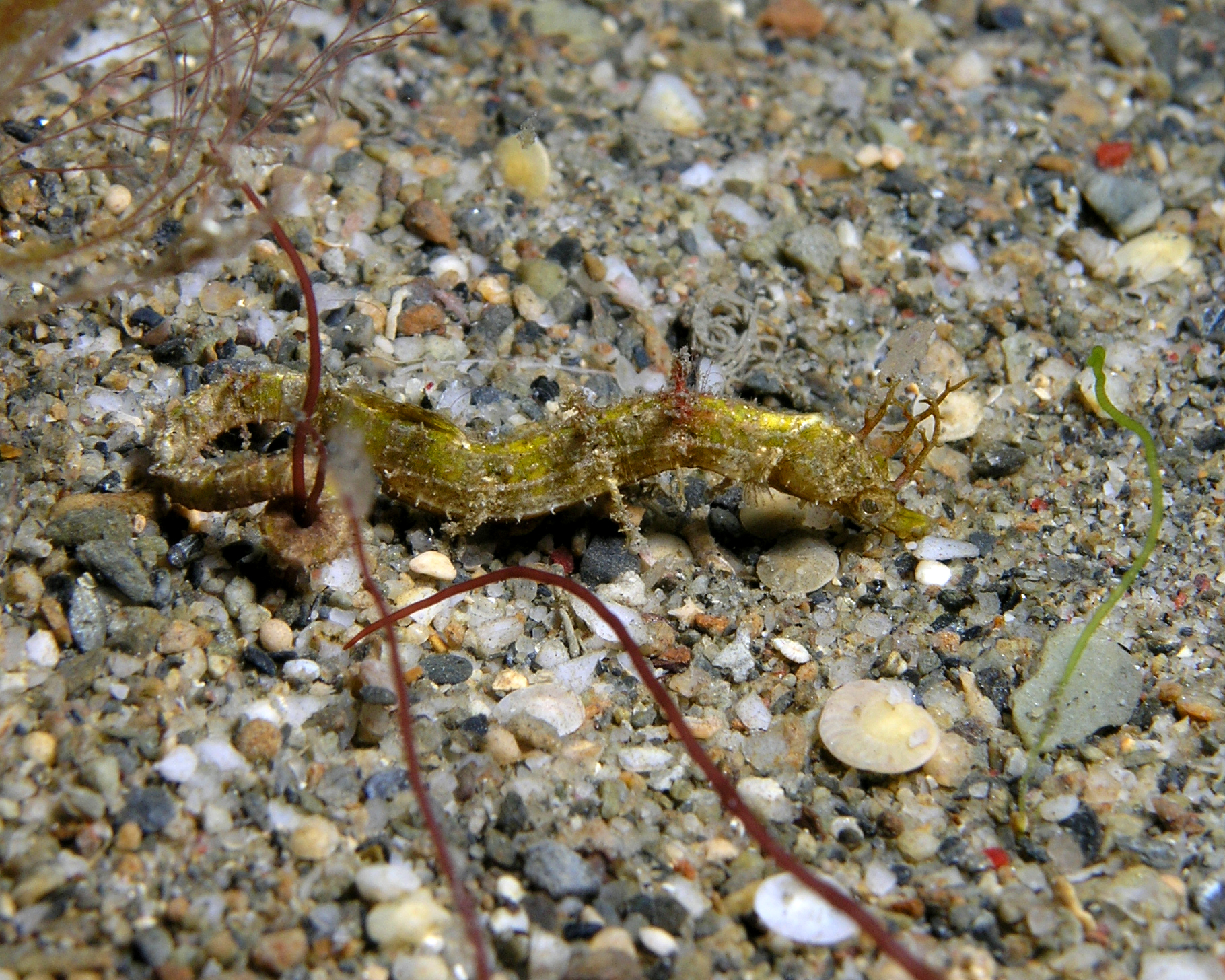
The pygmy pipehorse, Acentronura tentaculata, showing the prehensile tail

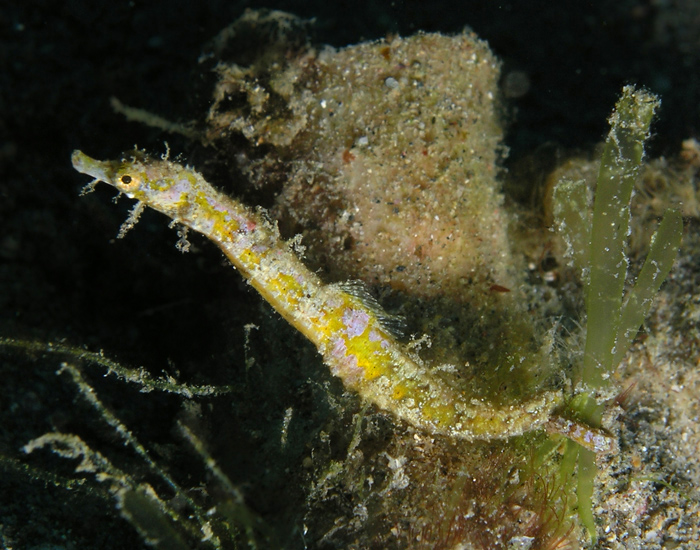
The pygmy pipehorse, Acentronura tentaculata, showing the cryptic colouration and overall appearance including the projections from the sides of the body

Adults may be found in or just above sandy or muddy substrates, around the base of macroalgae, especially red algae, or seagrass and close to or within coral reefs or rocky outcrops. Along with other members of the family Syngnathidae, they have protective bony or osseous armor plates covering their body surface. This limits their flexibility so that they tend to swim rather sluggishly with the body held horizontally, mainly using rapid fin movements. Like seahorses, their tail is prehensile and used for anchorage, winding itself around pieces of algae or seagrass. However, the front part of the body is typical pipefish, with the head and body held in line rather than bent through and angle like seahorses. There is sexual dimorphism and the males are somewhat larger and more robustly built than the females. Because they are so small, the brood pouch is also large in proportion to the body, giving the males a somewhat more seahorse-like appearance than the females which have the typical slim linear form of pipefishes.

Acentronura fish also have characteristically fused jaws like other members of the Syngnathidae. For those species where the feeding habits are known, the diet consists of small invertebrates such as planktonic crustacea which are snapped up by the small mouth at the tip of the snout, as they float past in the current. With a slim snout, relatively large eyes and raised rear part of the skull, the head is somewhat reminiscent of that of a seahorse, in contrast to the short, slim body. There are often projections sticking out from the body and head at intervals along the length of the fish.

== Reproduction ==
Acentronura species are ovoviviparous so they give birth to live young. Like seahorses (Hippocampus spp.) and many other members of the Syngnathidae, the eggs are transferred at mating into a brood pouch on the ventral surface of the male. The brood pouch extends from just behind the anus to about halfway along the fairly short tail and is relatively large compared to the small size of the fish. It is formed by elongated folds of the skin surface which are less well protected by bony plates than the rest of the body. The eggs are incubated within individual skin cells in the brood pouch, hatch, and are released as their yolk sac is exhausted.

Acentronura tentacula is the best known of these species, but it is likely that other species have similar habits. These fish are most commonly seen in pairs, and this has led to the supposition that they are monogamous. However it is not known whether they do form long-lived pairs bonds or if these are quite changeable (as has recently been confirmed for some seahorse species, which were also assumed to be monogamous). In A. tentacula, the only species about which much is known, these new-born fish become free-swimming pelagic members of the plankton until they are part-grown, when they settle into their preferred adult habitat.
