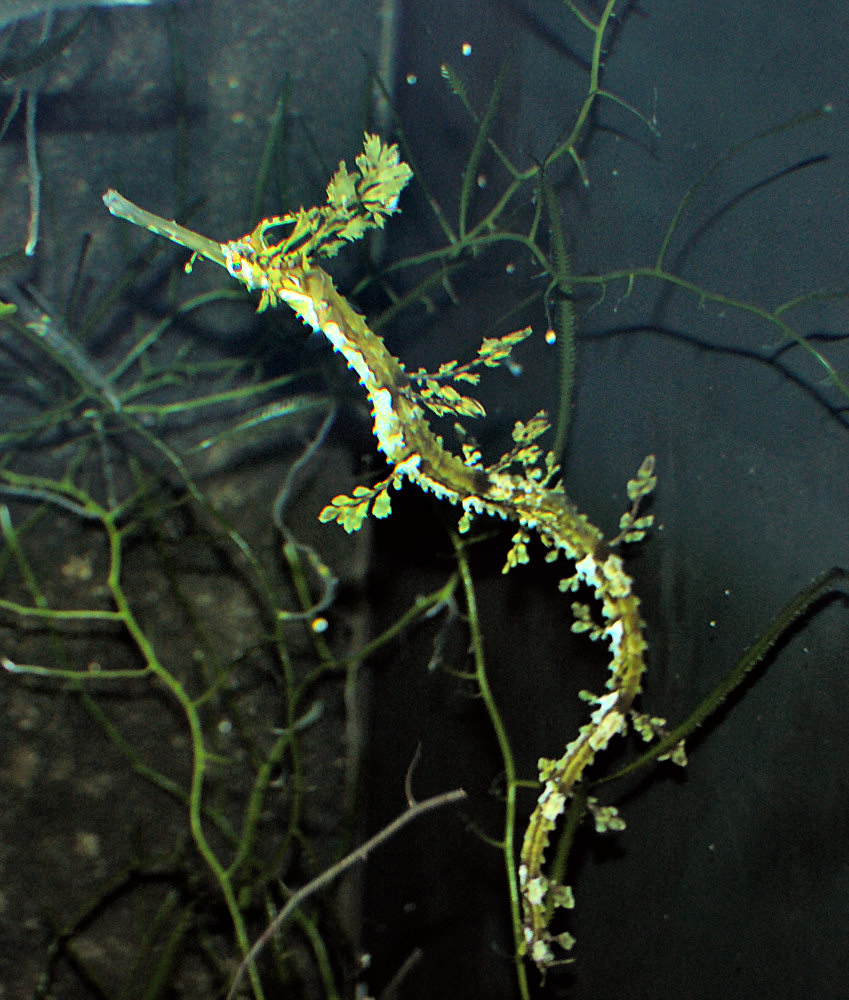

Conservation status
- Least Concern (IUCN 3.1)

Scientific classification
- Kingdom: Animalia
- Phylum: Chordata
- Class: Actinopterygii
- Division: Teleostei
- Order: Syngnathiformes
- Family: Syngnathidae
- Subfamily: Syngnathinae
- Genus: Haliichthys; J. E. Gray, 1859
- Species: H. taeniophorus

Binomial name
- Haliichthys taeniophorus J. E. Gray, 1859

= Haliichthys taeniophorus =

Ribboned Pipefish

Species of fish

The ribboned pipefish (Haliichthys taeniophorus), ribboned pipehorse or ribboned seadragon, is a species of pipefish found along the coast of northern Australia (Shark Bay to Torres Strait) and New Guinea (both West New Guinea and Papua New Guinea) in habitats ranging from shallow and weedy to deeper and sandy bottoms down to depths of 16.5 m (54 ft). This species grows to a total length of 30 cm (12 in). Their colors can range from greenish yellow to brownish red. This species is the only known member of its genus.

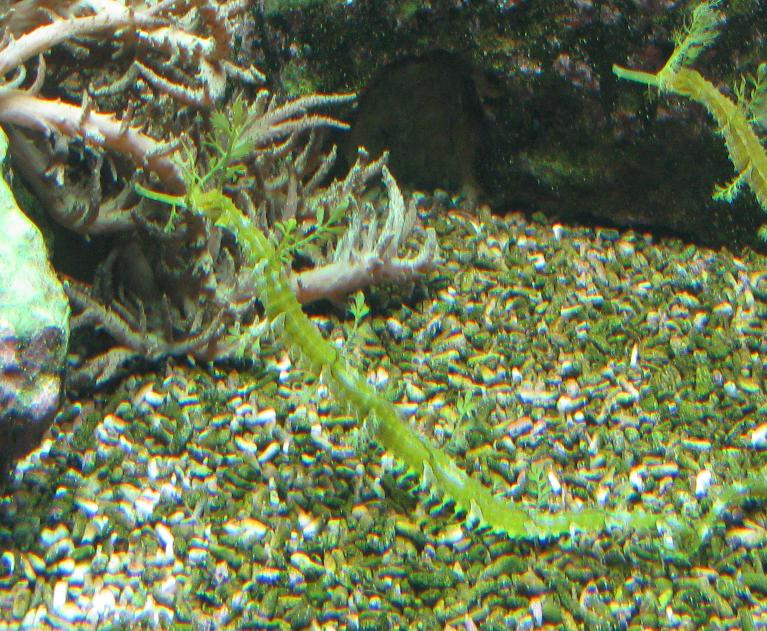
Example of a ribboned pipefish facing slightly more diagonal

They have evolved exclusively to their own phylogenetic lineage and possess the unique trait of a prehensile tail used to grab things vertically. It was likely developed as an adaptation to an ecological context where grasping was helpful, such as hanging on sea grasses vertically compared to pipehorses' typical habits of horizontally hanging on microalgae.

Although the exact phylogenetic position of this species is uncertain regarding the tail's evolution, it is hypothesized that the ribboned pipefish is similar to other pipefish and seahorses such as the Southern little pipehorse (I. australe) and bastard seahorse (A. gracilissima) due to a shared intermediate skeletal morphology. The species possesses a similar body plating at their ventral side to seahorses and rigid plate structure like other pipefish at their dorsal side. Due to this, the ribboned pipefish is often referred as not only a pipefish, but also as seahorses and seadragons.^{[1]}
