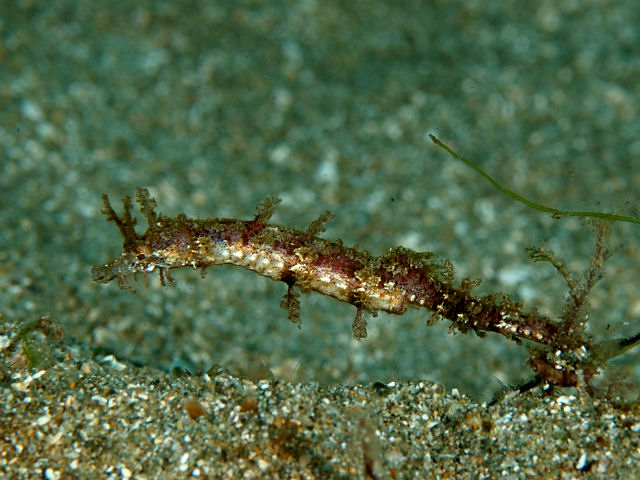

Conservation status
- Least Concern (IUCN 3.1)

Scientific classification
- Kingdom: Animalia
- Phylum: Chordata
- Class: Actinopterygii
- Order: Syngnathiformes
- Family: Syngnathidae
- Genus: Acentronura
- Species: A. gracilissima

Binomial name
- Acentronura gracilissima (Temminck & Schlegel, 1850)

Synonyms
- Hippocampus gracilissimus Temminck & Schlegel, 1850; Atelurus germani Duméril, 1870

= Acentronura gracilissima =

Species of fish

Acentronura gracilissima, the bastard seahorse, is a species of pygmy pipehorse from the coastal waters of Japan and Vietnam, it is expected to occur elsewhere but reports in other areas need to be confirmed. It occurs on rock and algae reefs downto depths of 40 metres (130 ft) where it feeds on mysids, small crabs, fish larvae and probably also on harpacticoid copepods and gammarid shrimps as recorded in other species in the family Syngnathidae. The bastard seahorse is ovoviviparous; the males incubate the eggs in a brood pouch located under the tail.
