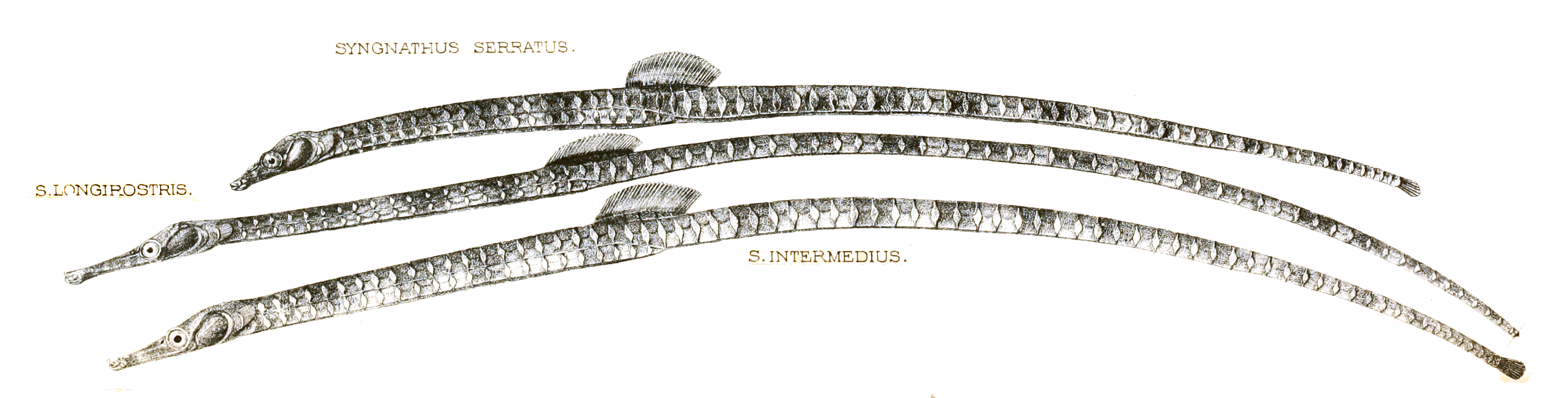

Conservation status
- Least Concern (IUCN 3.1)

Scientific classification
- Kingdom: Animalia
- Phylum: Chordata
- Class: Actinopterygii
- Order: Syngnathiformes
- Family: Syngnathidae
- Genus: Trachyrhamphus
- Species: T. longirostris

Binomial name
- Trachyrhamphus longirostris Kaup 1856

= Trachyrhamphus longirostris =

Long-head pipefish

Species of fish

Trachyrhamphus longirostris, also known as the long-head pipefish or straightstick pipefish, is a species of marine fish belonging to the family Syngnathidae. They can be found in muddy estuaries on the continental shelf throughout the Indo-Pacific from Eastern Africa to the Solomon Islands and Japan. The diet of Trachyrhamphus longirostris likely consists of small crustaceans. Adult individuals can grow to be approximately 33 centimeters in length. Reproduction occurs through ovoviviparity in which males brood eggs before giving live birth.
