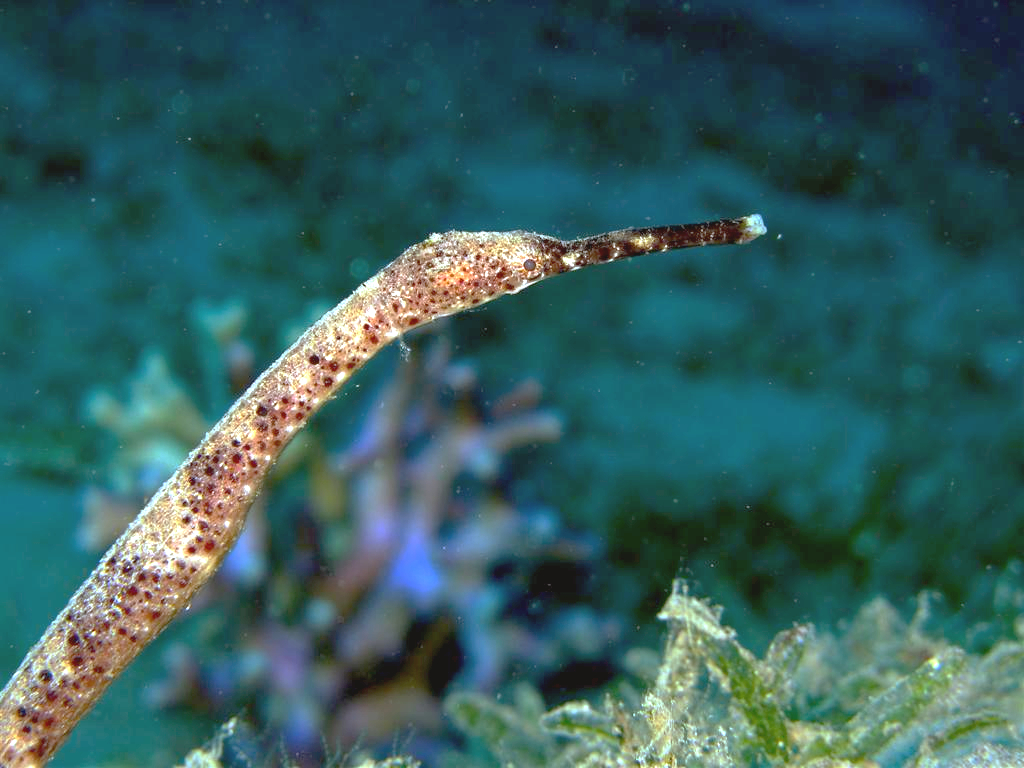

Conservation status
- Least Concern (IUCN 3.1)

Scientific classification
- Kingdom: Animalia
- Phylum: Chordata
- Class: Actinopterygii
- Division: Teleostei
- Order: Syngnathiformes
- Family: Syngnathidae
- Genus: Trachyrhamphus
- Species: T. bicoarctatus

Binomial name
- Trachyrhamphus bicoarctatus Bleeker 1857

= Trachyrhamphus bicoarctatus =

Double-ended pipefish

Species of fish

Trachyrhamphus bicoarctatus, also known as the double-ended pipefish, is a species of marine fish belonging to the family Syngnathidae. They can be found in reefs, seagrass beds, and sandy habitats throughout the Indo-Pacific from East Africa to New Caledonia and from Japan to Australia. Males of this species are considered mature when they reach approximately 26 centimeters long, but adults can grow to be lengths of 40 centimeters. Reproduction occurs through ovoviviparity in which males brood eggs before giving live birth.
