= Cylix tupareomanaia =

Scientific classification
- Kingdom: Animalia
- Phylum: Chordata
- Class: Actinopterygii
- Division: Teleostei
- Order: Syngnathiformes
- Family: Syngnathidae
- Genus: Cylix; Short & Trnski 2021
- Species: C. tupareomanaia

Binomial name
- Cylix tupareomanaia Short, Trnski & Ngātiwai 2021

Species of fish

Cylix tupareomanaia, the Manaia pygmy pipehorse, is a species of syngnathid, the family of seahorses and pipefish, and is endemic to New Zealand. It was first described in 2021, and is found in the northern parts of the North Island of New Zealand.

== Taxonomy ==
The description was published in 2021 and represents the first new species of syngnathid in New Zealand to be identified in 100 years.

Resembling other species of pygmy pipehorse of the Indo-Pacific region, genetic analysis indicates divergence from species of Acentronura and Idiotropiscis around 13 million years ago. A superficial resemblance to other species of Hippocampus, which also possess a coronet structure, saw early collections of this fish misidentified as Hippocampus jugumus, a rare species of the pacific southwest.

== Etymology ==
The authors distinguished the animal as a new genus Cylix, the Greek or Latin word for cup, a reference to the shape of the 'coronet' feature of its head. The researchers collaborated with the Ngātiwai people, traditional owners of the region where the species is found, their elders providing cultural information and names. The specific epithet tupareomanaia derives from Māori: Tu Pare o Manaia, translating as "the garland of the Manaia". The Māori name for a seahorse, Manaia, was also used for the common name assigned by the authors.

This is the first time that an indigenous group (Ngātiwai, a Māori iwi or tribe) has formally named a new species of animal.

== Description ==
The head is notably angled and tail is prehensile.

It occupies habitat composed of algae, sponges and bryozoans at coral outcrops and reefs.

== Distribution ==
The species is found temperate coastal waters of New Zealand, offshore of coastal headlands at Whangaruru in Northland and also around the inshore islands Nukutaunga (Cavalli Islands), Pēwhairangi (Bay of Islands), and Tawhiti Rahi and Aorangi in the Poor Knights Islands, occurring at depths between twelve and twenty metres.
