= Tunjice Hills =

Group of hills in Tunjice, Slovenia

Coordinates: 46°17′17″N 14°34′2″E

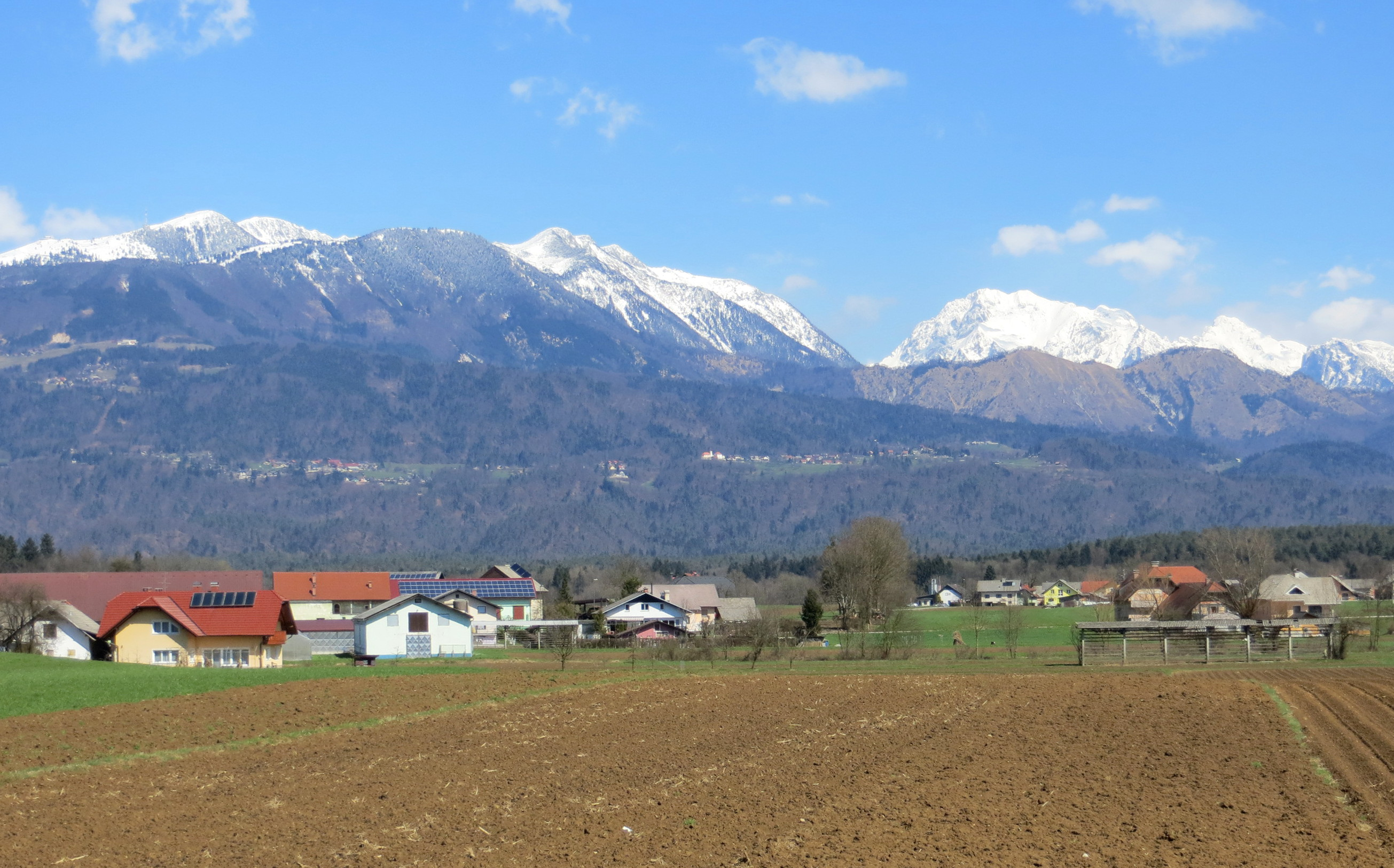
The Tunjice Hills rising above Breg pri Komendi, with the Kamnik–Savinja Alps in the background

The Tunjice Hills (pronounced [ˈtuːnjitsɛ]; Slovene: Tunjiško gričevje) are a group of hills around Tunjice in western Slovenia.

== Geography ==
The southern border of the Tunjice Hills extends from Kamnik in the east to Komenda in the west, where the hills meet the Ljubljana Basin. The hills rise to the north toward the Kamnik–Savinja Alps.

== Paleontology ==
In 1997 a fossilized coprolite layer was discovered in the Tunjice Hills. It is approximately 13 million years old, dating from when the Pannonian Sea covered the area, and was probably deposited by dolphins and other vertebrates. The layer has preserved the fossilized remains of insects, fish, plants, snails, and even jellyfish. Between 2005 and 2007, the site yielded seahorse fossils that have been classified as new species: Hippocampus sarmaticus and Hippocampus slovenicus. Other finds in the hills include a caudal vertebra from what is believed to have been a toothed whale.
