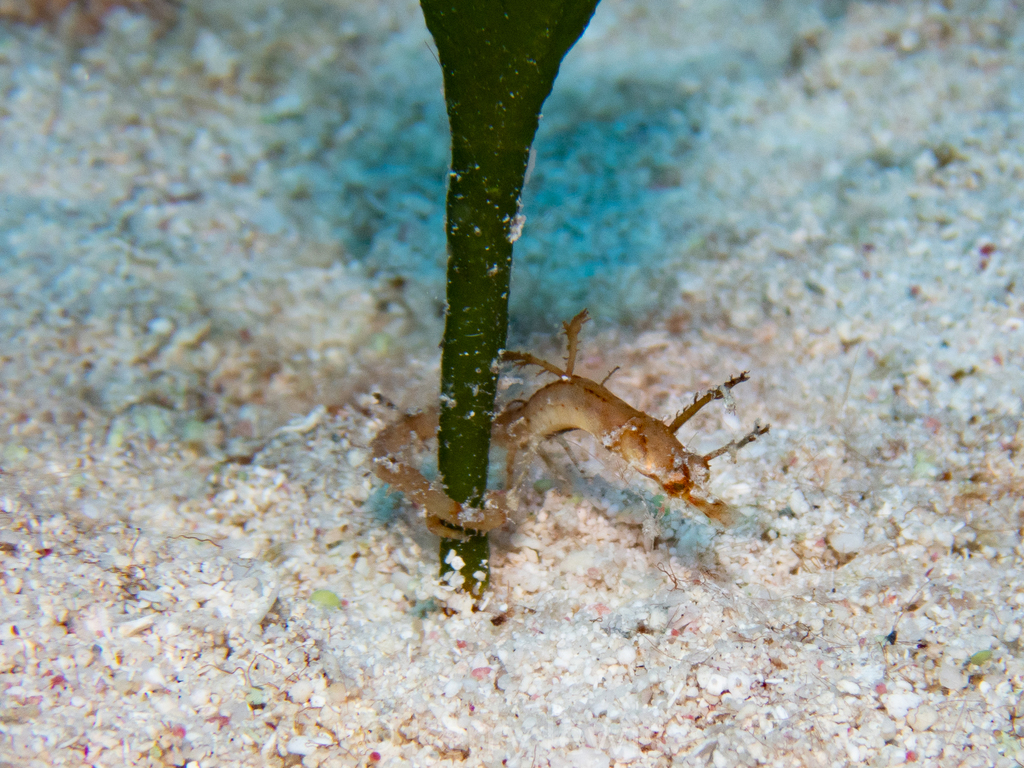

Conservation status
- Least Concern (IUCN 3.1)

Scientific classification
- Kingdom: Animalia
- Phylum: Chordata
- Class: Actinopterygii
- Order: Syngnathiformes
- Family: Syngnathidae
- Subfamily: Syngnathinae
- Genus: Amphelikturus; A. E. Parr, 1930
- Species: A. dendriticus

Binomial name
- Amphelikturus dendriticus (T. Barbour, 1905)

Synonyms
- Siphostoma dendriticum Barbour, 1905; Acentronura dendritica (Barbour, 1905)

= Amphelikturus =

Species of fish

Amphelikturus dendriticus, the pipehorse, is a species of pygmy pipehorse native to the western Atlantic Ocean. This small, highly camouflaged pipefish is rarely seen. This species grows to a length of 7.5 centimetres (3.0 in) TL. This species is the only known member of its genus.
