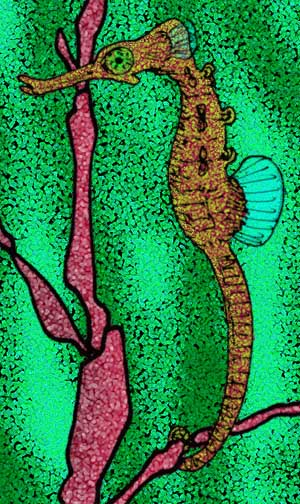
- Artist's reconstruction

Scientific classification
- Kingdom: Animalia
- Phylum: Chordata
- Class: Actinopterygii
- Division: Teleostei
- Order: Syngnathiformes
- Family: Syngnathidae
- Genus: Hippocampus
- Species: †H. slovenicus

Binomial name
- †Hippocampus slovenicus Žalohar, Hiti, Križnar, 2009

= Hippocampus slovenicus =

Hippocampus slovenicus Temporal range: Middle Miocene (Serravallian), 12.8–11.6 Ma

Extinct species of fish

Hippocampus slovenicus is an extinct species of seahorse from the Middle Miocene of Europe, where it inhabited the Paratethys Sea. Fossil specimens were discovered in 2005 from the Serravallian-aged coprolite horizon of the Dol Formation of the Tunjice hills lagerstätte in Slovenia, along with the related Hippocampus sarmaticus.

The horizon dates 13 million years back to the lower Sarmatian during the middle Miocene period, making the two species the earlier known seahorse fossils in the world. The remains consist mostly of juvenile specimens and of head and backbones of adults. H. slovenicus had a narrow head with a long snout about 50% HL with 11 trunk rings and a short tail 50% more of body with 25-26 tail rings and an extremely long dorsal fin base. Hippocampus slovenicus had numerous small black spots of pigment all over the body. H. sarmaticus appears to show taxonomic affinities to the modern pygmy seahorses.

The animals are believed to have lived among seagrasses and macroalgae in the temperate shallow coastal waters of the western part of the central Paratethys.
