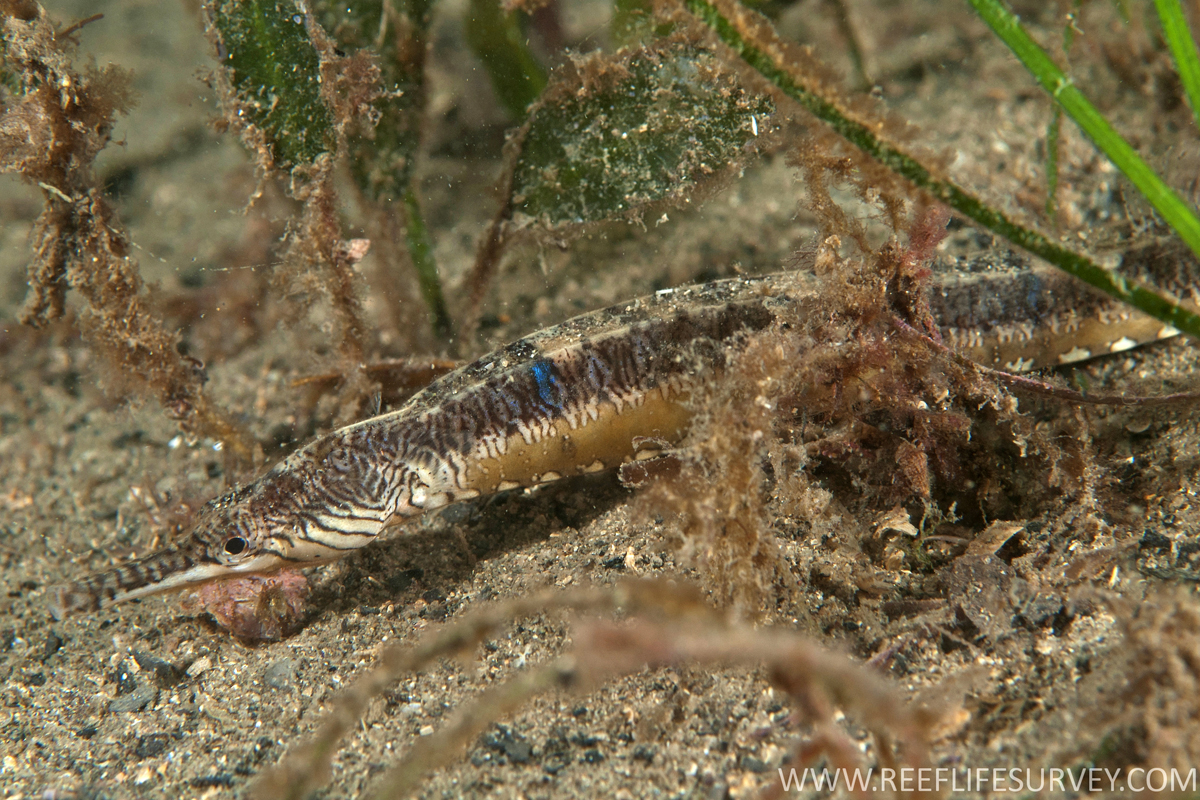

Conservation status
- Least Concern (IUCN 3.1)

Scientific classification
- Domain: Eukaryota
- Kingdom: Animalia
- Phylum: Chordata
- Class: Actinopterygii
- Order: Syngnathiformes
- Family: Syngnathidae
- Subfamily: Syngnathinae
- Genus: Filicampus; Whitley, 1948
- Species: F. tigris

Binomial name
- Filicampus tigris (Castelnau, 1879)

Synonyms
- Syngnathus tigris Castelnau, 1879; Syngnathus superciliaris Günther, 1880

= Tiger pipefish =

Species of fish

The tiger pipefish (Filicampus tigris) is a species of pipefish native to the marine waters around Australia at depths of from 2 to 27 metres (6.6 to 88.6 ft). This species grows to a length of 29.6 centimetres (11.7 in) SL. This species is the only known member of its genus.
