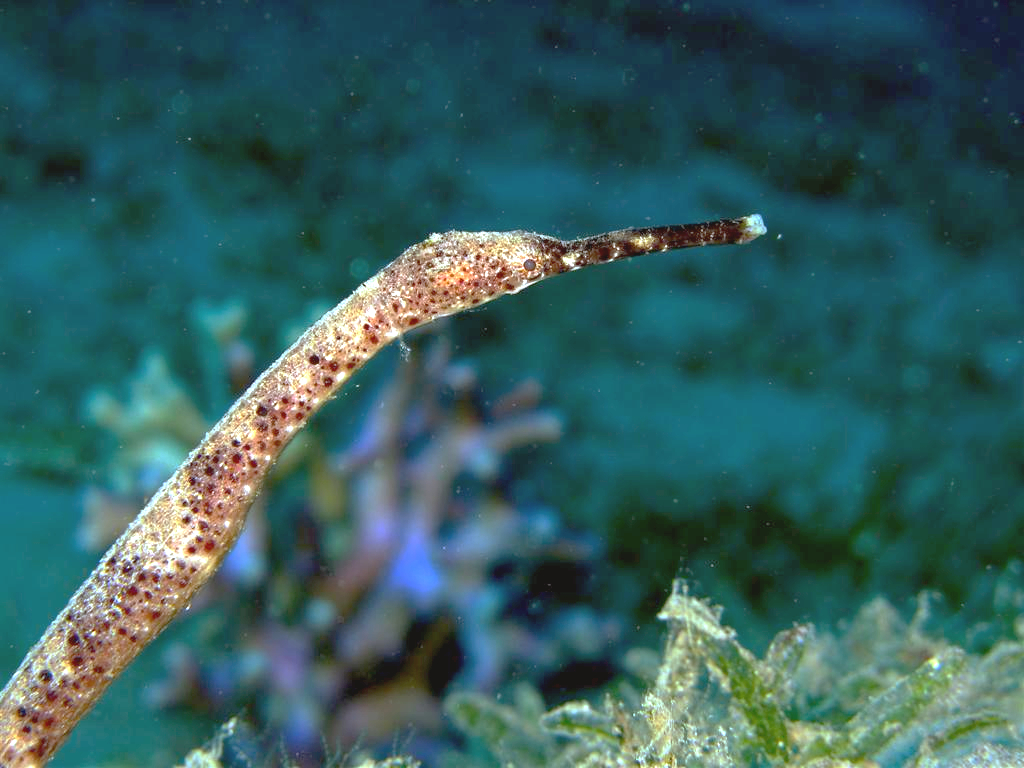
- Double-ended pipefish (T. bicoarctatus)

Scientific classification
- Kingdom: Animalia
- Phylum: Chordata
- Class: Actinopterygii
- Division: Teleostei
- Order: Syngnathiformes
- Family: Syngnathidae
- Subfamily: Syngnathinae
- Genus: Trachyrhamphus; Kaup, 1853

Type species
- Syngnathus serratus Temminck & Schlegel, 1850

Synonyms
- Yozia Jordan & Snyder

= Trachyrhamphus =

Genus of fishes

Trachyrhamphus is a genus of pipefishes native to the Indian and western Pacific Oceans.

== Species ==
There are currently three recognized species in this genus:

- Trachyrhamphus bicoarctatus (Bleeker, 1857) (Double-ended pipefish)
- Trachyrhamphus longirostris Kaup, 1856 (Long-head pipefish, Straightstick pipefish)
- Trachyrhamphus serratus (Temminck & Schlegel, 1850)
