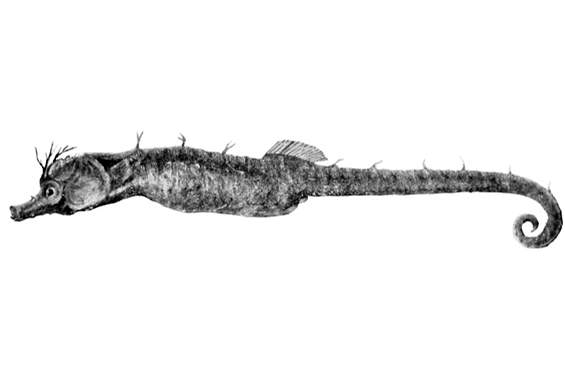

Conservation status
- Data Deficient (IUCN 3.1)

Scientific classification
- Kingdom: Animalia
- Phylum: Chordata
- Class: Actinopterygii
- Order: Syngnathiformes
- Family: Syngnathidae
- Genus: Idiotropiscis
- Species: I. australis

Binomial name
- Idiotropiscis australis (Waite & Hale, 1921)

Synonyms
- Acentronura australe Waite & Hale, 1921

= Southern little pipehorse =

Species of fish

The southern little pipehorse (Idiotropiscis australis) is a species of fish in the family Syngnathidae. It is endemic to Australia. Its natural habitats are open seas, shallow seas, subtidal aquatic beds, and coral reefs. It camouflages amongst species of red algae. It is threatened by habitat loss.
