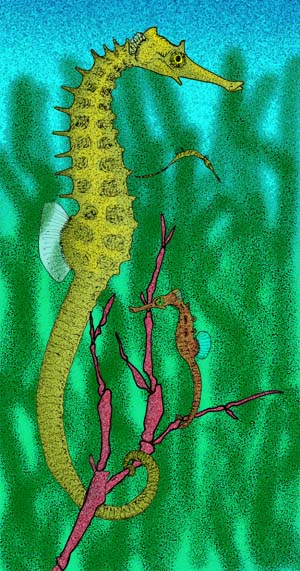
- Artist's reconstruction with the smaller S. slovenicus on the right

Scientific classification
- Kingdom: Animalia
- Phylum: Chordata
- Class: Actinopterygii
- Order: Syngnathiformes
- Family: Syngnathidae
- Genus: Hippocampus
- Species: †H. sarmaticus

Binomial name
- †Hippocampus sarmaticus Žalohar, Hiti, Križnar, 2009

= Hippocampus sarmaticus =

Hippocampus sarmaticus Temporal range: Middle Miocene (Serravallian), 12.8–11.6 Ma

Extinct species of fish

Hippocampus sarmaticus is an extinct species of seahorse from the Middle Miocene of Europe, where it inhabited the Paratethys Sea. Fossil specimens were discovered in 2005 from the Serravallian-aged coprolite horizon of the Dol Formation of the Tunjice hills lagerstätte in Slovenia, along with the related Hippocampus slovenicus.

The Dol Formation dates 11 to 13 million years back to the lower Sarmatian during the middle Miocene period, making the two species the earlier known seahorse fossils in the world. Among the remains, one adult female specimen is fully preserved, with bony plates and other important macroscopic features. The rest are mostly juvenile specimens and remains of head and backbones of adults. H. sarmaticus appears to show some taxonomic affinities to the modern Hippocampus trimaculatus.

The animals are believed to have lived among seagrasses and macroalgae in the temperate shallow coastal waters of the western part of the central Paratethys.
