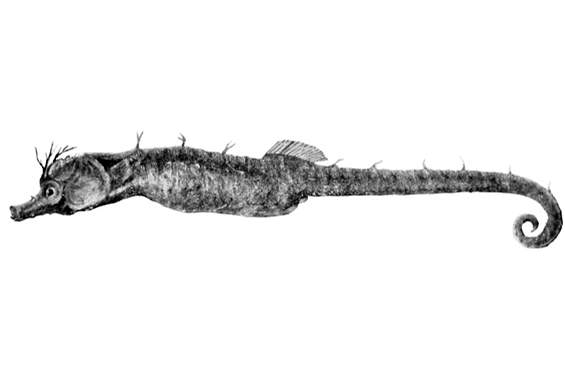
- Southern little pipehorse, Idiotropiscis australe

Scientific classification
- Kingdom: Animalia
- Phylum: Chordata
- Class: Actinopterygii
- Order: Syngnathiformes
- Family: Syngnathidae
- Subfamily: Syngnathinae
- Genus: Idiotropiscis; Whitley, 1947

Type species
- Acentronura australe Waite & Hale, 1921

= Idiotropiscis =

Genus of fishes

Idiotropiscis is a genus of pygmy pipehorse endemic to Australia. They are commonly called pygmy pipehorses due to their small size.

== Species ==
There are currently three recognized species in this genus:

- Idiotropiscis australe (Waite & Hale, 1921) (Southern little pipehorse)
- Idiotropiscis larsonae (C. E. Dawson, 1984) (Helen's pygmy pipehorse)
- Idiotropiscis lumnitzeri Kuiter, 2004 (Sydney's pygmy pipehorse)
