= Tunjice =

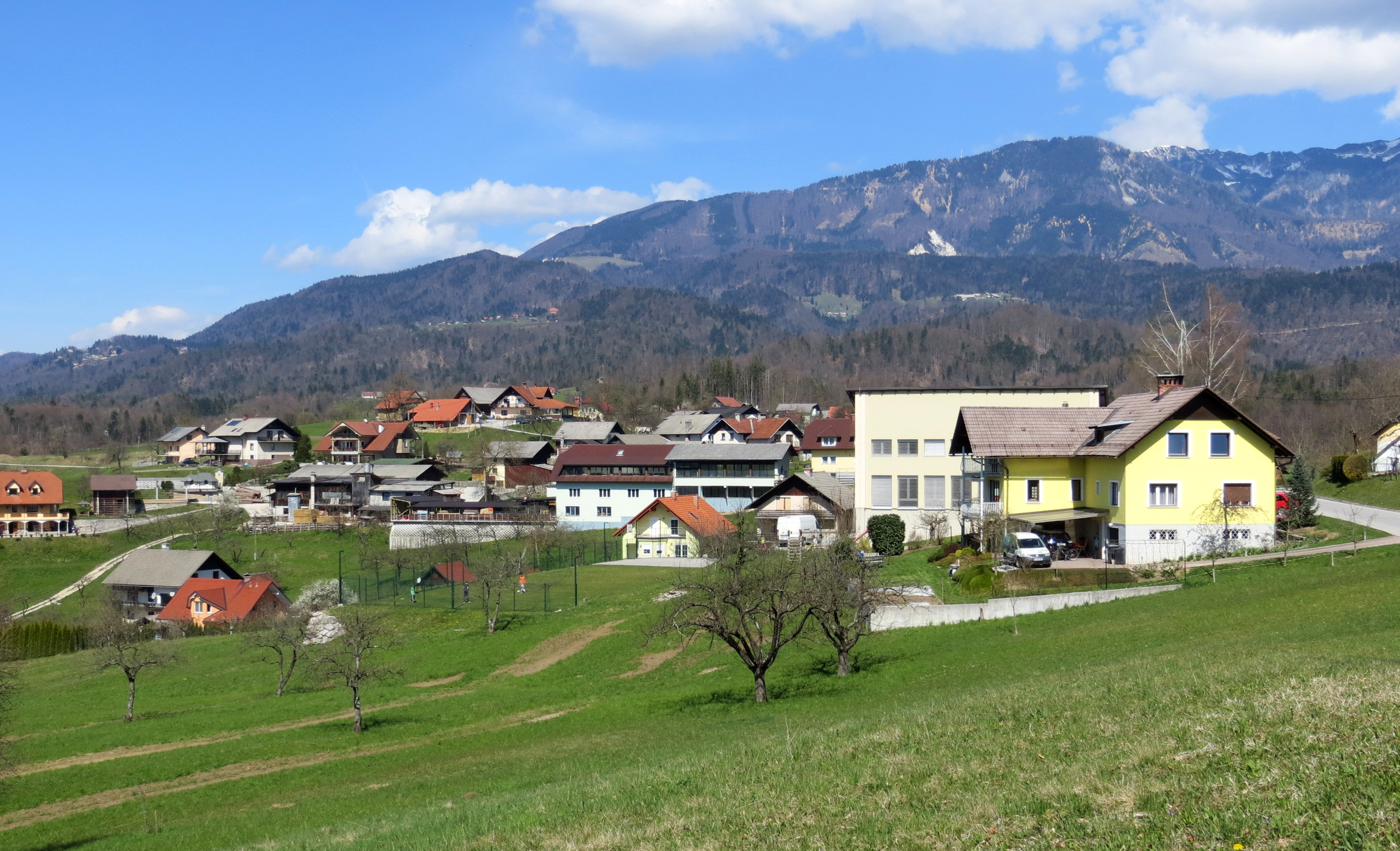

- Location in Slovenia
- Coordinates: 46°14′3.86″N 14°34′25.29″E
- Country: Slovenia
- Traditional region: Upper Carniola
- Statistical region: Central Slovenia
- Municipality: Kamnik

Area
  - Total: 3.61 km^{2} (1.39 sq mi)
- Elevation: 370 m (1,210 ft)

Population (2002)
  - Total: 246

Tunjice (pronounced [ˈtuːnjitsɛ]; German: Theinitz) is a dispersed settlement in the Tunjice Hills (Slovene: Tunjiško gričevje) west of the town of Kamnik in Upper Carniola region of Slovenia.

In the forest close to the church a "natural healing grove" with several "energy springs," known as the Tunjice Natural Health Resort, has been established.

== Name ==
Tunjice was attested in historical sources as Tevnicz in 1306, Toͤvnicz in 1302, Tewnicz in 1397, Tewcz in 1405, and Teynitz in 1499. The name is probably derived from the adjective *tun'e 'free, given', referring to land that was transferred as a gift.

== Church ==
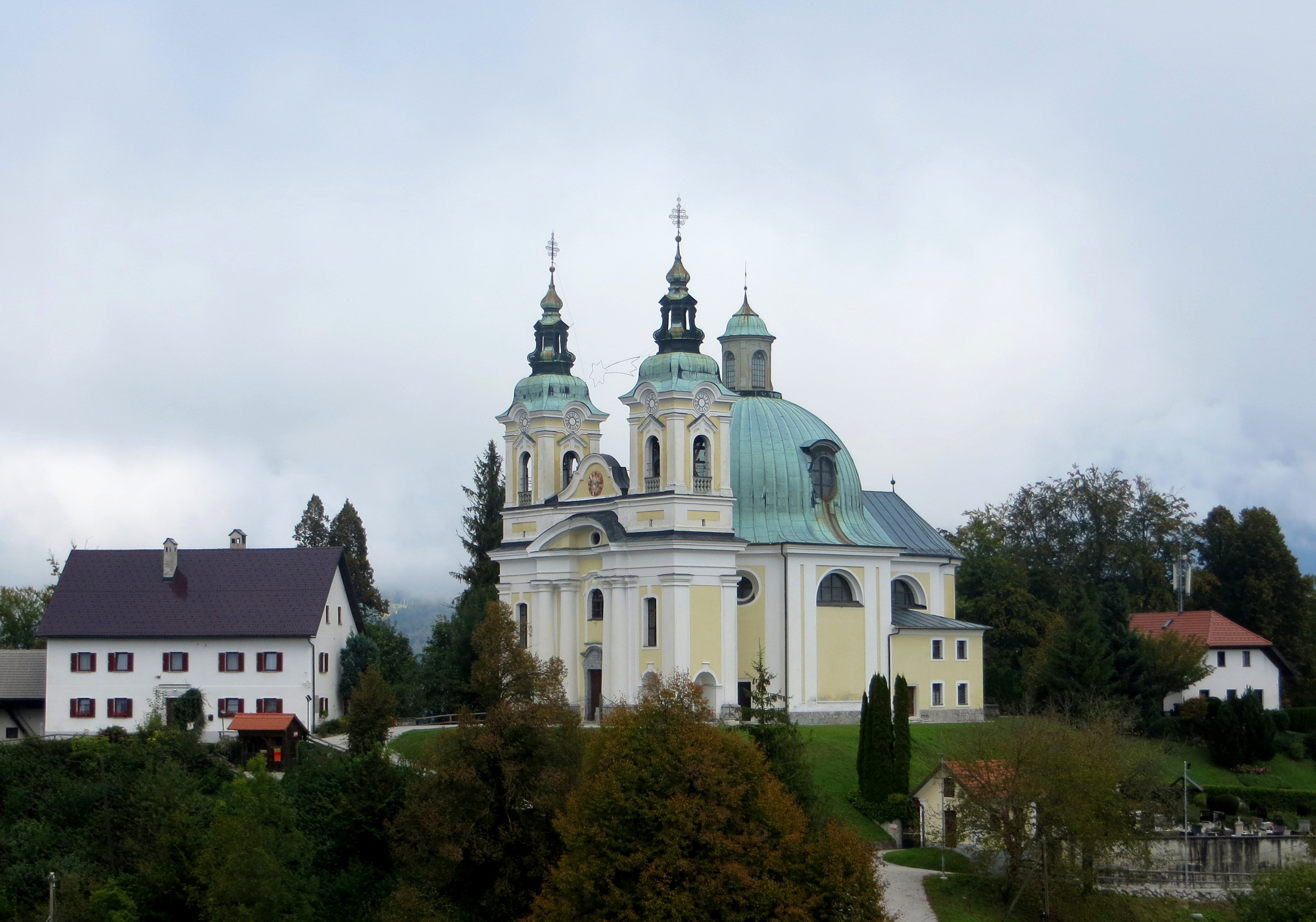
View from south

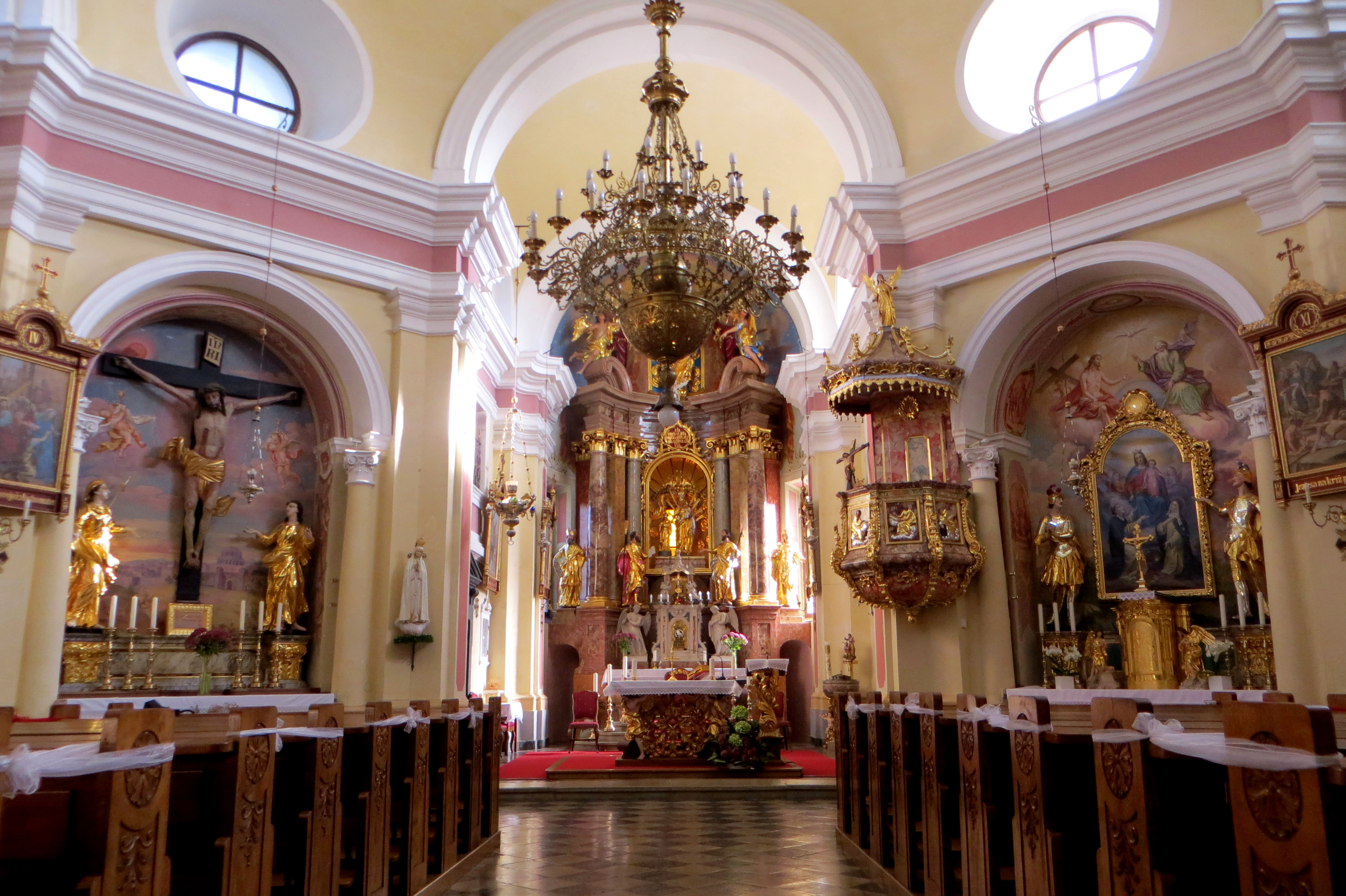
Interior

Saint Anne's Church

The parish church, dedicated to Saint Anne, stands on a hill above the settlement and is an imposing High-Baroque domed building. It was commissioned by Peter Pavel Glavar and built from 1761 to 1766 based on plans by the architect Lovrenc Prager.

== Notable people ==
Notable people that were born or lived in Tunjice include:

- France Stele (1886–1972), art historian and conservation specialist
