= Gillellus inescatus =

Conservation status
- Data Deficient (IUCN 3.1)

Scientific classification
- Kingdom: Animalia
- Phylum: Chordata
- Class: Actinopterygii
- Order: Blenniiformes
- Family: Dactyloscopidae
- Genus: Gillellus
- Species: G. inescatus

Binomial name
- Gillellus inescatus J. T. Williams, 2002

Species of fish

Gillellus inescatus, the flagfin stargazer, is a species of tropical sand stargazer native to the Caribbean Sea.

== Etymology ==
The specific epithet "inescatus" is derived from the Latin word "inescare" (to bait). It refers to the structure at the back of the head and front of the spine, shaped like an anglerfish's esca, which Williams theorizes may be used as bait for luring prey, in a style similar to anglerfish, or as a means to attract potential mates. The species' common name, "flagfin stargazer" refers to the structure's resemblance to a small flag atop the blenny's spine.

== Description ==
Based on the single known specimen, Gillellus inescatus can reach a length of 2.35 centimetres (0.93 in). Its body is elongate and compressed, primarily creamy-white, with eight reddish-brown saddles and blue chromatophores on the head. The esca-like structure is at the tip of the elongated spine on the first dorsal fin and is reddish brown. Williams describes G. inescatus as being similar to G. uranidea, G. healae, and G. jacksoni, with the esca being a noticeable distinguishing trait.

== Distribution ==
The full extent of the distribution of Gillellus inescatus is uncertain, as it is only known from the holotype specimen, found between Northwest Point and Lulu Bay, Navassa Island. This single specimen was collected from a depth range of 27 to 30 metres (89 to 98 ft).
