= Dactyloscopus minutus =

Conservation status
- Least Concern (IUCN 3.1)

Scientific classification
- Kingdom: Animalia
- Phylum: Chordata
- Class: Actinopterygii
- Order: Blenniiformes
- Family: Dactyloscopidae
- Genus: Dactyloscopus
- Species: D. minutus

Binomial name
- Dactyloscopus minutus C. E. Dawson, 1975

Species of fish

Dactyloscopus minutus, the tiny stargazer, is a species of sand stargazer native to the Pacific coast of Mexico where it can be found at depths of from 0 to 2 metres (0.0 to 6.6 ft).
