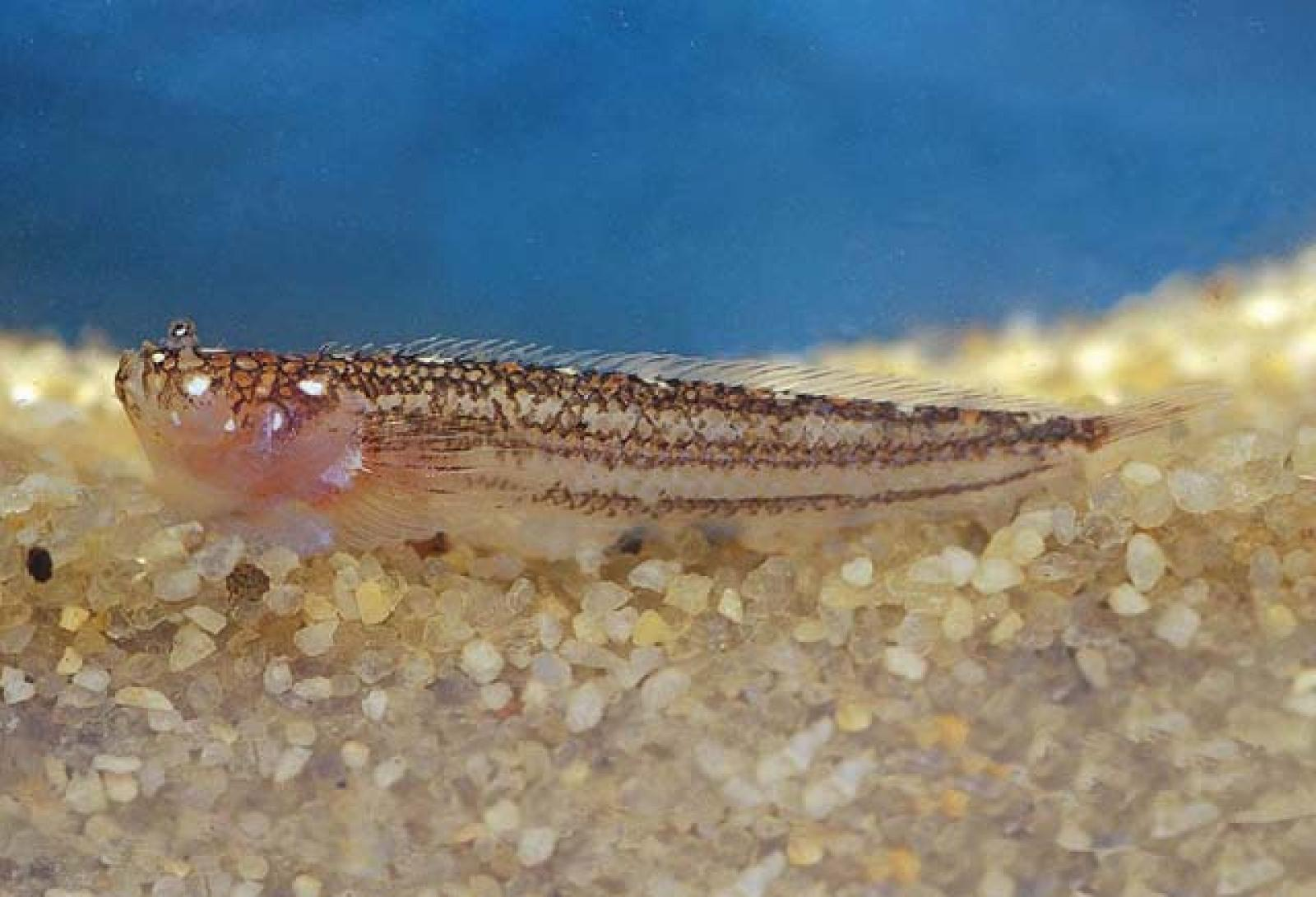

Conservation status
- Least Concern (IUCN 3.1)

Scientific classification
- Kingdom: Animalia
- Phylum: Chordata
- Class: Actinopterygii
- Order: Blenniiformes
- Family: Dactyloscopidae
- Genus: Dactyloscopus
- Species: D. byersi

Binomial name
- Dactyloscopus byersi C. E. Dawson, 1969

Synonyms
- Dactyloscopus byersorum Dawson 1969

= Dactyloscopus byersi =

Species of fish

Dactyloscopus byersi, the notchtail stargazer, is a species of sand stargazer native to the Pacific coast of Mexico to Panama where it can be found at depths of from 0 to 2 metres (0.0 to 6.6 ft). It can reach a maximum length of 5 centimetres (2.0 in) NG.

== Etymology ==
The specific name honours Major and Mrs. Joseph Byers, about whom no other information is available, since the name honours two people it should be Dactyloscopus byersorum.
