= Platygillellus bussingi =

Conservation status
- Near Threatened (IUCN 3.1)

Scientific classification
- Kingdom: Animalia
- Phylum: Chordata
- Class: Actinopterygii
- Order: Blenniiformes
- Family: Dactyloscopidae
- Genus: Platygillellus
- Species: P. bussingi

Binomial name
- Platygillellus bussingi C. E. Dawson, 1974

Species of fish

Platygillellus bussingi, Bussing's stargazer, is a species of sand stargazer native to the Pacific coast of Costa Rica and Panama where it can be found on sandy bottoms at depths of from 1 to 15 metres (3.3 to 49.2 ft). It can reach a maximum length of 5 centimetres (2.0 in) TL.

== Etymology ==
Its specific name honours the ichthyologist and collector of the type William Bussing (1933-2014) of the Universidad de Costa Rica.
