= Dactyloscopus metoecus =

Conservation status
- Least Concern (IUCN 3.1)

Scientific classification
- Kingdom: Animalia
- Phylum: Chordata
- Class: Actinopterygii
- Order: Blenniiformes
- Family: Dactyloscopidae
- Genus: Dactyloscopus
- Species: D. metoecus

Binomial name
- Dactyloscopus metoecus C. E. Dawson, 1975

Species of fish

Dactyloscopus metoecus, the Mexican stargazer, is a species of sand stargazer native to the Pacific coast of Mexico where it can be found at depths of from 0 to 7 metres (0 to 23 ft).
