= Dactyloscopus comptus =

Conservation status
- Least Concern (IUCN 3.1)

Scientific classification
- Kingdom: Animalia
- Phylum: Chordata
- Class: Actinopterygii
- Order: Blenniiformes
- Family: Dactyloscopidae
- Genus: Dactyloscopus
- Species: D. comptus

Binomial name
- Dactyloscopus comptus C. E. Dawson, 1982

Species of fish

Dactyloscopus comptus is a species of sand stargazer native to the coastal waters of the Bahamas and possibly Puerto Rico and the Virgin Islands. It can reach a maximum length of 3.9 centimetres (1.5 in) SL.
