= Dactylagnus parvus =

Conservation status
- Least Concern (IUCN 3.1)

Scientific classification
- Kingdom: Animalia
- Phylum: Chordata
- Class: Actinopterygii
- Order: Blenniiformes
- Family: Dactyloscopidae
- Genus: Dactylagnus
- Species: D. parvus

Binomial name
- Dactylagnus parvus C. E. Dawson, 1976

Species of fish

Dactylagnus parvus, the Panamic stargazer, is a species of sand stargazer found along the Pacific coast from southern Baja California down to Panama, where it can be found down to a depth of about 6 metres (20 ft). It can reach a maximum length of 3.2 centimetres (1.3 in) SL.
