= Dactyloscopus insulatus =

Conservation status
- Vulnerable (IUCN 3.1)

Scientific classification
- Kingdom: Animalia
- Phylum: Chordata
- Class: Actinopterygii
- Order: Blenniiformes
- Family: Dactyloscopidae
- Genus: Dactyloscopus
- Species: D. insulatus

Binomial name
- Dactyloscopus insulatus C.E.Dawson, 1975

Species of fish

Dactyloscopus insulatus is a species of sand stargazer from the Eastern Pacific Ocean.

== Distribution ==
The species is endemic to the Revillagigedo Islands, such as San Benedicto Island, Socorro Island and Clarion Island.
