= Gillellus chathamensis =

Conservation status
- Vulnerable (IUCN 3.1)

Scientific classification
- Kingdom: Animalia
- Phylum: Chordata
- Class: Actinopterygii
- Order: Blenniiformes
- Family: Dactyloscopidae
- Genus: Gillellus
- Species: G. chathamensis

Binomial name
- Gillellus chathamensis C. E. Dawson, 1977

Species of fish

Gillellus chathamensis, the Cocos stargazer, is a species of sand stargazer endemic to Cocos Island, Costa Rica where it can be found in areas with sandy bottoms at depths of from 5 to 12 metres (16 to 39 ft). It can reach a maximum length of 3.8 centimetres (1.5 in) TL.
