= Myxodagnus =

Scientific classification
- Domain: Eukaryota
- Kingdom: Animalia
- Phylum: Chordata
- Class: Actinopterygii
- Order: Blenniiformes
- Family: Dactyloscopidae
- Genus: Myxodagnus; T. N. Gill, 1861

Type species
- Myxodagnus opercularis T. N. Gill, 1861

Genus of fishes

Myxodagnus is a genus of sand stargazers, native to the Pacific and Atlantic coastal waters of the Americas.

== Species ==
There are currently five recognized species in this genus:

- Myxodagnus belone J. E. Böhlke, 1968 (Dartfish)
- Myxodagnus macrognathus Hildebrand, 1946
- Myxodagnus opercularis T. N. Gill, 1861 (Dart stargazer)
- Myxodagnus sagitta G. S. Myers & Wade, 1946
- Myxodagnus walkeri C. E. Dawson, 1976
