= Dactyloscopus foraminosus =

Conservation status
- Least Concern (IUCN 3.1)

Scientific classification
- Kingdom: Animalia
- Phylum: Chordata
- Class: Actinopterygii
- Order: Blenniiformes
- Family: Dactyloscopidae
- Genus: Dactyloscopus
- Species: D. foraminosus

Binomial name
- Dactyloscopus foraminosus C. E. Dawson, 1982

Species of fish

Dactyloscopus foraminosus, the reticulate stargazer, is a species of sand stargazer native to the coastal waters of Brazil where it can be found at depths of from 11 to 79 metres (36 to 259 ft). This species may also occur off the coast of Florida, United States. It can reach a maximum length of 7.9 centimetres (3.1 in) NG.
