= Platygillellus altivelis =

Conservation status
- Near Threatened (IUCN 3.1)

Scientific classification
- Kingdom: Animalia
- Phylum: Chordata
- Class: Actinopterygii
- Order: Blenniiformes
- Family: Dactyloscopidae
- Genus: Platygillellus
- Species: P. altivelis

Binomial name
- Platygillellus altivelis C. E. Dawson, 1974

Species of fish

Platygillellus altivelis, the Sailfin stargazer, is a species of sand stargazer native to the Pacific coast of Costa Rica and Panama where it can be found on sandy bottoms at depths of from 3 to 37 metres (9.8 to 121.4 ft). It can reach a maximum length of 4.4 centimetres (1.7 in) TL.
