= Dactyloscopus boehlkei =

Conservation status
- Least Concern (IUCN 3.1)

Scientific classification
- Kingdom: Animalia
- Phylum: Chordata
- Class: Actinopterygii
- Order: Blenniiformes
- Family: Dactyloscopidae
- Genus: Dactyloscopus
- Species: D. boehlkei

Binomial name
- Dactyloscopus boehlkei C. E. Dawson, 1982

Species of fish

Dactyloscopus boehlkei is a species of sand stargazer native to the coastal waters around the Bahamas, Cuba and the Lesser Antilles where it can be found at depths of from 0 to 8 metres (0 to 26 ft). It can reach a maximum length of 5.5 centimetres (2.2 in) SL.

== Etymology ==
The specific name honours the American ichthyologist James Erwin Böhlke (1930-1982) who was curator of fishes at the Academy of Natural Sciences of Philadelphia.
