= Dactylagnus peratikos =

Conservation status
- Data Deficient (IUCN 3.1)

Scientific classification
- Kingdom: Animalia
- Phylum: Chordata
- Class: Actinopterygii
- Order: Blenniiformes
- Family: Dactyloscopidae
- Genus: Dactylagnus
- Species: D. peratikos

Binomial name
- Dactylagnus peratikos J. E. Böhlke & D. K. Caldwell, 1961

Species of fish

Dactylagnus peratikos is a species of sand stargazer found along the Atlantic coast of Costa Rica and Panama. It can reach a maximum length of 6.6 centimetres (2.6 in) SL.
