= Myxodagnus belone =

Conservation status
- Data Deficient (IUCN 3.1)

Scientific classification
- Kingdom: Animalia
- Phylum: Chordata
- Class: Actinopterygii
- Order: Blenniiformes
- Family: Dactyloscopidae
- Genus: Myxodagnus
- Species: M. belone

Binomial name
- Myxodagnus belone J. E. Böhlke, 1968

Species of fish

Myxodagnus belone, the dartfish, is a species of sand stargazer native to the waters around the Bahamas and Puerto Rico where they can be found on sandy bottoms from near the surface to 4 metres (13 ft) in depth. This species can reach a maximum length of 8.2 centimetres (3.2 in) SL.
