= Gillellus searcheri =

Conservation status
- Least Concern (IUCN 3.1)

Scientific classification
- Kingdom: Animalia
- Phylum: Chordata
- Class: Actinopterygii
- Order: Blenniiformes
- Family: Dactyloscopidae
- Genus: Gillellus
- Species: G. searcheri

Binomial name
- Gillellus searcheri C. E. Dawson, 1977

Species of fish

Gillellus searcheri, the Searcher stargazer, is a species of sand stargazer native to the Pacific coast of the Americas from Mexico to Panama where they prefer areas with sandy substrates at depths of from 1 to 15 metres (3.3 to 49.2 ft). It can reach a maximum length of 3.5 centimetres (1.4 in) TL.

== Etymology ==
The specific name honours the research vessel Searcher, the type being collected aboard this vessel.
