= Platygillellus smithi =

Conservation status
- Data Deficient (IUCN 3.1)

Scientific classification
- Kingdom: Animalia
- Phylum: Chordata
- Class: Actinopterygii
- Order: Blenniiformes
- Family: Dactyloscopidae
- Genus: Platygillellus
- Species: P. smithi

Binomial name
- Platygillellus smithi C. E. Dawson, 1982

Species of fish

Platygillellus smithi is a species of sand stargazer native to the waters around the Bahamas where it occurs at depths of from 0 to 9 metres (0 to 30 ft). It can reach a maximum length of 3.4 centimetres (1.3 in) SL.

== Etymology ==
Its specific name honours the collector of the type C. Lavett Smith (1927-2015) who was curator of fishes at the American Museum of Natural History.
