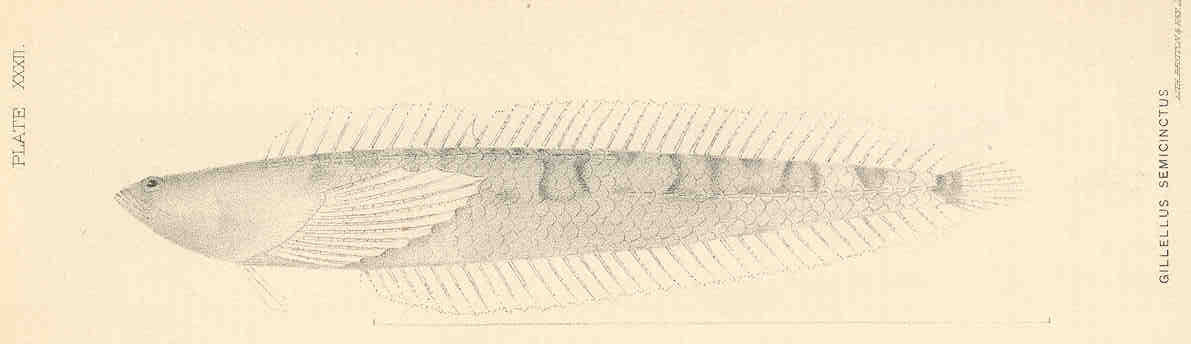
- Gillellus semicinctus

Scientific classification
- Domain: Eukaryota
- Kingdom: Animalia
- Phylum: Chordata
- Class: Actinopterygii
- Order: Blenniiformes
- Family: Dactyloscopidae
- Genus: Gillellus; C. H. Gilbert, 1890

Type species
- Gillellus semicinctus C. H. Gilbert, 1890

= Gillellus =

Genus of fishes

Gillellus is a genus of sand stargazers, found in the eastern central Pacific Ocean and western central Atlantic Ocean.

== Species ==
There are currently 10 recognized species in this genus:

- Gillellus arenicola C. H. Gilbert, 1890 (Sandy stargazer)
- Gillellus chathamensis C. E. Dawson, 1977 (Cocos stargazer)
- Gillellus greyae Kanazawa, 1952 (Arrow stargazer)
- Gillellus healae C. E. Dawson, 1982 (Masked stargazer)
- Gillellus inescatus J. T. Williams, 2002
- Gillellus jacksoni C. E. Dawson, 1982
- Gillellus ornatus C. H. Gilbert, 1892 (Ornate stargazer)
- Gillellus searcheri C. E. Dawson, 1977 (Searcher stargazer)
- Gillellus semicinctus C. H. Gilbert, 1890 (Half-banded stargazer)
- Gillellus uranidea J. E. Böhlke, 1968 (Warteye stargazer)

== Etymology ==
The name of this genus is a diminutive of the surname Gill and is in honour of the American zoologist Theodore Nicholas Gill (1837-1914) of the Smithsonian Institution.
