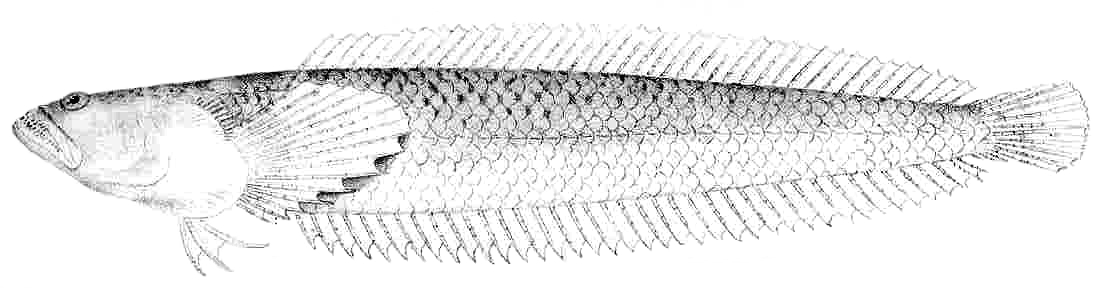
- Dactylagnus mundus

Scientific classification
- Kingdom: Animalia
- Phylum: Chordata
- Class: Actinopterygii
- Order: Blenniiformes
- Family: Dactyloscopidae
- Genus: Dactylagnus; T. N. Gill, 1863

Type species
- Dactylagnus mundus T. N. Gill, 1863

= Dactylagnus =

Genus of fishes

Dactylagnus is a genus of sand stargazers, found in the eastern central Pacific and western central Atlantic Ocean.

== Species ==
There are currently three recognized species in this genus:

- Dactylagnus mundus T. N. Gill, 1863 (Giant sand stargazer)
- Dactylagnus parvus C. E. Dawson, 1976 (Panamic stargazer)
- Dactylagnus peratikos J. E. Böhlke & D. K. Caldwell, 1961
