= Myxodagnus walkeri =

Conservation status
- Least Concern (IUCN 3.1)

Scientific classification
- Kingdom: Animalia
- Phylum: Chordata
- Class: Actinopterygii
- Order: Blenniiformes
- Family: Dactyloscopidae
- Genus: Myxodagnus
- Species: M. walkeri

Binomial name
- Myxodagnus walkeri C. E. Dawson, 1976

Species of fish

Myxodagnus walkeri is a species of sand stargazer native to the Pacific coast of Central America from Nayarit, Mexico to Golfo de Nicoya, Costa Rica where it can be found at depths of from 0 to 6 metres (0 to 20 ft). It can reach a maximum length of 5.5 centimetres (2.2 in) SL.

== Etymology ==
The specific name of this fish honours the fisheries biologist Boyd W. Walker (1917-2001) of the University of California, Los Angeles.
