= Dactyloscopus fimbriatus =

Conservation status
- Least Concern (IUCN 3.1)

Scientific classification
- Kingdom: Animalia
- Phylum: Chordata
- Class: Actinopterygii
- Order: Blenniiformes
- Family: Dactyloscopidae
- Genus: Dactyloscopus
- Species: D. fimbriatus

Binomial name
- Dactyloscopus fimbriatus (Reid, 1935)

Synonyms
- Cokeridia fimbriata Reid, 1935

Species of fish

Dactyloscopus fimbriatus is a species of sand stargazer native to the Pacific coastal waters of Central and South America from Nicaragua to Ecuador where it can be found at depths of from 15 to 22 metres (49 to 72 ft). It can reach a maximum length of 7.6 centimetres (3.0 in) SL.
