= Myxodagnus sagitta =

Conservation status
- Vulnerable (IUCN 3.1)

Scientific classification
- Kingdom: Animalia
- Phylum: Chordata
- Class: Actinopterygii
- Order: Blenniiformes
- Family: Dactyloscopidae
- Genus: Myxodagnus
- Species: M. sagitta

Binomial name
- Myxodagnus sagitta G. S. Myers & Wade, 1946

Species of fish

Myxodagnus sagitta is a species of sand stargazer endemic to the Galapagos Islands where it can be found in areas with sandy bottoms at depths of from 18 to 46 metres (59 to 151 ft). This species can reach a maximum length of 6.1 centimetres (2.4 in) SL.
