= Gillellus greyae =

Conservation status
- Least Concern (IUCN 3.1)

Scientific classification
- Kingdom: Animalia
- Phylum: Chordata
- Class: Actinopterygii
- Order: Blenniiformes
- Family: Dactyloscopidae
- Genus: Gillellus
- Species: G. greyae

Binomial name
- Gillellus greyae Kanazawa, 1952

Species of fish

Gillellus greyae, the arrow stargazer, is a species of sand stargazer native to the Atlantic coast of the Americas from Florida, United States to Brazil including the Bahamas and Cuba where it can be found in sandy patches on reefs. It can reach a maximum length of approximately 9 centimetres (3.5 in) TL. This species can also be found in the aquarium trade. The specific name honours the American ichthyologist Marion Griswold Grey (1911-1964) of the Division of Fishes at the Field Museum of Natural History in Chicago, Illinois.
