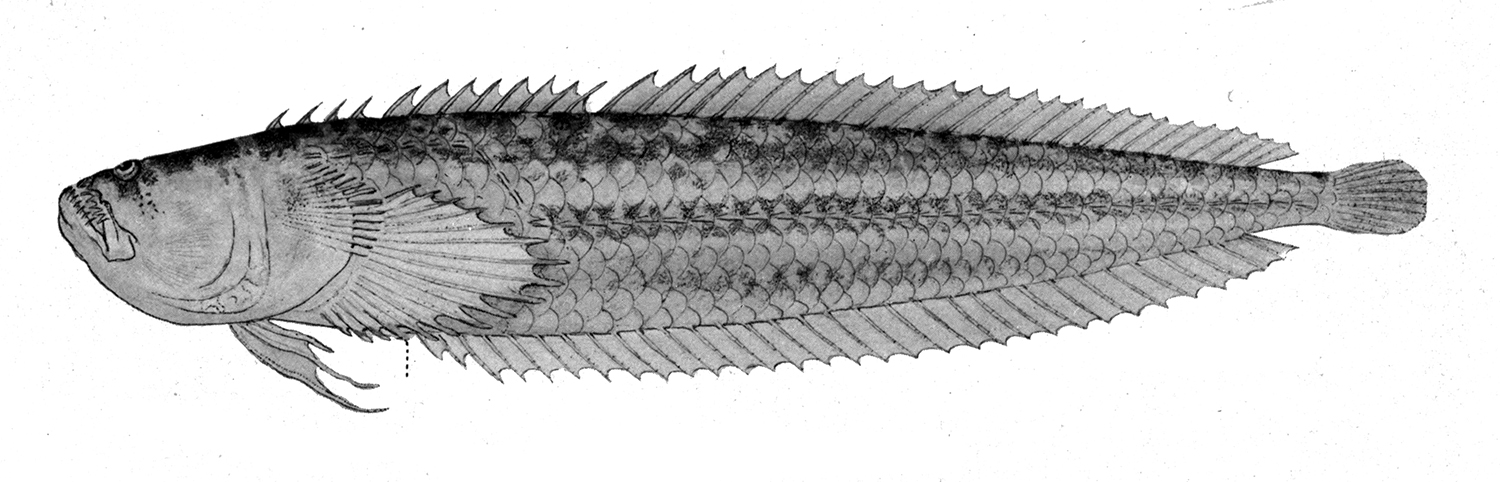

Conservation status
- Least Concern (IUCN 3.1)

Scientific classification
- Kingdom: Animalia
- Phylum: Chordata
- Class: Actinopterygii
- Order: Blenniiformes
- Family: Dactyloscopidae
- Genus: Dactyloscopus
- Species: D. amnis

Binomial name
- Dactyloscopus amnis R. R. Miller & Briggs, 1962

= Dactyloscopus amnis =

Species of fish

Dactyloscopus amnis, the riverine stargazer, is a species of sand stargazer native to the Pacific coastal waters of Mexico where it is found in both marine and brackish water habitats.
