= Leurochilus acon =

Conservation status
- Least Concern (IUCN 3.1)

Scientific classification
- Kingdom: Animalia
- Phylum: Chordata
- Class: Actinopterygii
- Order: Blenniiformes
- Family: Dactyloscopidae
- Genus: Leurochilus
- Species: L. acon

Binomial name
- Leurochilus acon J. E. Böhlke, 1968

Species of fish

Leurochilus acon, the Smoothlip stargazer, is a species of sand stargazer native to the waters around the Caribbean islands of the Bahamas, the Virgin Islands, Antigua and Cuba where it can be found on bottoms consisting of sand, marl and rock at depths from near the surface to 8 metres (26 ft). It can reach a maximum length of 2.9 centimetres (1.1 in) SL. This species is currently the only known member of its genus.
