= Campichthys nanus =

Conservation status
- Data Deficient (IUCN 3.1)

Scientific classification
- Kingdom: Animalia
- Phylum: Chordata
- Class: Actinopterygii
- Order: Syngnathiformes
- Family: Syngnathidae
- Genus: Campichthys
- Species: C. nanus

Binomial name
- Campichthys nanus Dawson, 1977

Species of fish

Campichthys nanus is a species of marine fish of the family Syngnathidae. It is known from its type specimens that were collected at Pinda, Morrumbala District, Mozambique in the Western Indian Ocean, although there have been unverified reports of its occurrence in the South China Sea as well. This species reaches maturity at 2.5 centimetres (0.98 in) and is one of the smallest tail-brooding pipefishes, with males carrying eggs before giving live birth. Habitats and feeding habits of this species are unknown.
