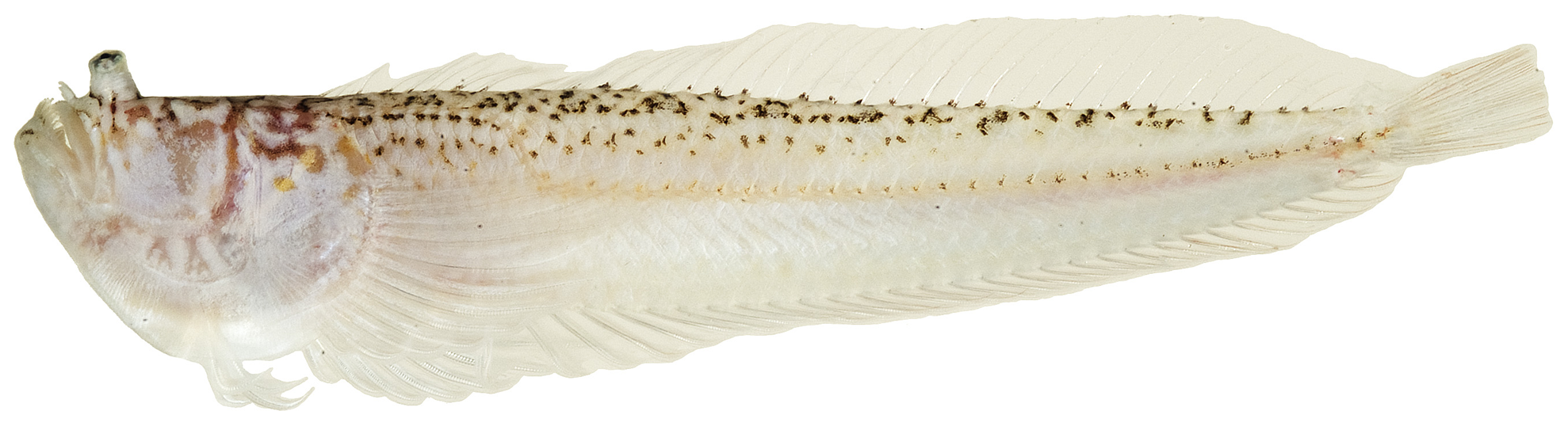
- Dactyloscopus tridigitatus

Scientific classification
- Domain: Eukaryota
- Kingdom: Animalia
- Phylum: Chordata
- Class: Actinopterygii
- Order: Blenniiformes
- Family: Dactyloscopidae
- Genus: Dactyloscopus; T. N. Gill, 1859

Type species
- Dactyloscopus tridigitatus T. N. Gill, 1859

Synonyms
- Cokeridia Meek & Hildebrand, 1928; Congrammus Fowler, 1906; Esloscopus D.S. Jordan & Starks, 1896; Jopaica Pinto, 1970; Paragillellus Carvalho & Pinto, 1965; Paramyxodagnus Carvalho & Pinto, 1965; Springeria Carvalho & Pinto, 1965; Tamandareia Carvalho & Pinto, 1965

= Dactyloscopus =

Genus of fishes

Dactyloscopus is a genus of sand stargazers native to the coasts of the Americas.

== Species ==
There are currently 20 recognized species in this genus:

- Dactyloscopus amnis R. R. Miller & Briggs, 1962 (Riverine stargazer)
- Dactyloscopus boehlkei C. E. Dawson, 1982
- Dactyloscopus byersi C. E. Dawson, 1969 (Notchtail stargazer)
- Dactyloscopus comptus C. E. Dawson, 1982
- Dactyloscopus crossotus Starks, 1913 (Bigeye stargazer)
- Dactyloscopus elongatus G. S. Myers & Wade, 1946
- Dactyloscopus fallax C. E. Dawson, 1975
- Dactyloscopus fimbriatus (Reid, 1935)
- Dactyloscopus foraminosus C. E. Dawson, 1982 (Reticulate stargazer)
- Dactyloscopus heraldi C. E. Dawson, 1975
- Dactyloscopus insulatus C. E. Dawson, 1975
- Dactyloscopus lacteus (G. S. Myers & Wade, 1946) (Milky sand stargazer)
- Dactyloscopus lunaticus C. H. Gilbert, 1890 (Moonstruck stargazer)
- Dactyloscopus metoecus C. E. Dawson, 1975 (Mexican stargazer)
- Dactyloscopus minutus C. E. Dawson, 1975 (Tiny stargazer)
- Dactyloscopus moorei (Fowler, 1906) (Speckled stargazer)
- Dactyloscopus pectoralis T. N. Gill, 1861 (Whitesaddle stargazer)
- Dactyloscopus poeyi T. N. Gill, 1861 (Shortchin stargazer)
- Dactyloscopus tridigitatus T. N. Gill, 1859 (Sand stargazer)
- Dactyloscopus zelotes D. S. Jordan & C. H. Gilbert, 1896
