= Dactyloscopus zelotes =

Conservation status
- Data Deficient (IUCN 3.1)

Scientific classification
- Kingdom: Animalia
- Phylum: Chordata
- Class: Actinopterygii
- Order: Blenniiformes
- Family: Dactyloscopidae
- Genus: Dactyloscopus
- Species: D. zelotes

Binomial name
- Dactyloscopus zelotes D. S. Jordan & C. H. Gilbert, 1896

Species of fish

Dactyloscopus zelotes is a species of sand stargazer native to the Pacific coast of Central and South America from El Salvador to Ecuador. It can reach a maximum length of 7.2 centimetres (2.8 in) SL.
