= Dactyloscopus lacteus =

Conservation status
- Vulnerable (IUCN 3.1)

Scientific classification
- Kingdom: Animalia
- Phylum: Chordata
- Class: Actinopterygii
- Order: Blenniiformes
- Family: Dactyloscopidae
- Genus: Dactyloscopus
- Species: D. lacteus

Binomial name
- Dactyloscopus lacteus (G. S. Myers & Wade, 1946)

Synonyms
- Cockeridia lactea G. S. Myers & Wade, 1946

Species of fish

Dactyloscopus lacteus, the milky sand stargazer, is a species of sand stargazer endemic to the Galapagos Islands where it is the only species of Dactyloscopus known to occur there, and is a common fish in its region. It can be found in tide pools and sandy shores at depths of from 2 to 9 metres (6.6 to 29.5 ft). It can grow to reach a maximum length of 5 centimetres (2.0 in) SL.
