= Hippichthys parvicarinatus =

Short-keel pipefish

Conservation status
- Least Concern (IUCN 3.1)

Scientific classification
- Kingdom: Animalia
- Phylum: Chordata
- Class: Actinopterygii
- Order: Syngnathiformes
- Family: Syngnathidae
- Genus: Hippichthys
- Species: H. parvicarinatus

Binomial name
- Hippichthys parvicarinatus Dawson, 1978

Synonyms
- Syngnathus parvicarinatus Dawson, 1978

Species of fish

The short-keel pipefish (Hippichthys parvicarinatus) is a species of fish of the family Syngnathidae. It is known from Darwin (Northern Australia) to the Torres Strait and southern Papua New Guinea. It lives in coastal fresh and brackish habitats, such as mudflats, mangroves, gravel, sandy and rocky habitats, and coral and shell rubble. It can grow to lengths of 12 centimetres (4.7 in). It is expected to feed on small crustaceans such as copepods, shrimps and mysids, similar to other pipefish. This species is ovoviviparous, with males carrying eggs in a brood pouch before giving birth to live young. Males may brood at 7.8 centimetres (3.1 in).

== Identification ==
H. parvicarinatus is light to dark brown, with the darkest colouring found on the distal half of the tail, lower side, stomach, and dark ring bars.
