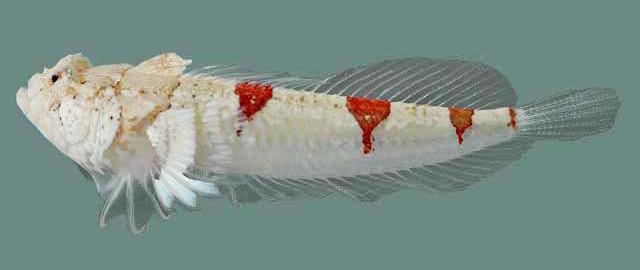

Conservation status
- Least Concern (IUCN 3.1)

Scientific classification
- Kingdom: Animalia
- Phylum: Chordata
- Class: Actinopterygii
- Order: Blenniiformes
- Family: Dactyloscopidae
- Genus: Gillellus
- Species: G. uranidea

Binomial name
- Gillellus uranidea J. E. Böhlke, 1968
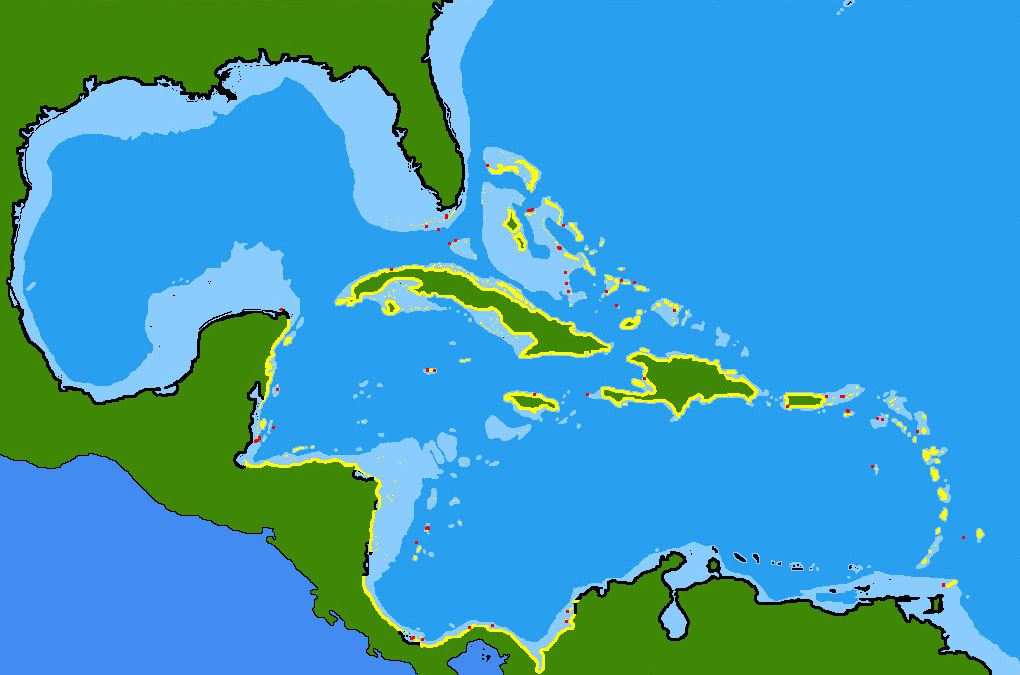

= Gillellus uranidea =

Species of fish

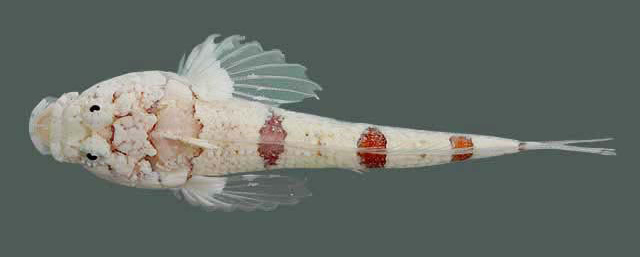
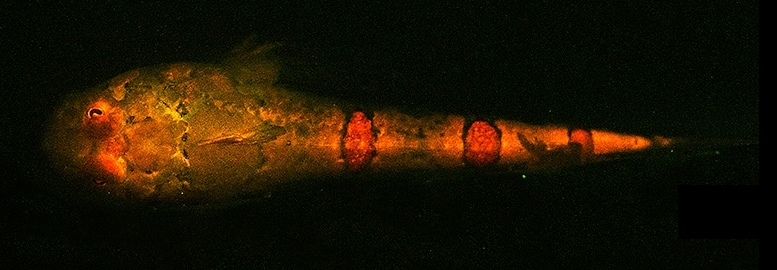
Biofluorescence of Gillellus uranidea (top view)

The warteye stargazer (Gillellus uranidea) is a species of sand stargazer native to the Atlantic coast of southwestern Florida, United States, and in the Caribbean Sea from the Bahamas and the coast of Central America to Panama where it can be found in sandy areas on reefs or among rocks. It is an ambush predator, burying itself nearly completely in the sand and waiting for prey items to come along. It can reach a maximum length of 5 cm (2.0 in) TL.

The warteye stargazer exhibits biofluorescence, that is, when illuminated by blue or ultraviolet light, it re-emits it in the yellow-red range, and appears differently than under white light illumination (see image to the right). Biofluorescence may assist in intraspecific communication and camouflage.
