= Platygillellus brasiliensis =

Conservation status
- Least Concern (IUCN 3.1)

Scientific classification
- Kingdom: Animalia
- Phylum: Chordata
- Class: Actinopterygii
- Order: Blenniiformes
- Family: Dactyloscopidae
- Genus: Platygillellus
- Species: P. brasiliensis

Binomial name
- Platygillellus brasiliensis Feitoza, 2002

Species of fish

Platygillellus brasiliensis, the Brazilian sand stargazer, is a species of sand stargazer native to the Atlantic coast of Brazil where it can be found at depths of from 1 to 6 metres (3.3 to 19.7 ft) in areas with gravel substrates in which it buries itself almost completely except the eyes and the dorsal finlet. Males of this species can reach a maximum length of 4.1 centimetres (1.6 in) SL, while females can reach a maximum length of 4.0 centimetres (1.6 in) SL.
