= Storrsia =

Conservation status
- Least Concern (IUCN 3.1)

Scientific classification
- Kingdom: Animalia
- Phylum: Chordata
- Class: Actinopterygii
- Order: Blenniiformes
- Family: Dactyloscopidae
- Genus: Storrsia; Dawson, 1982
- Species: S. olsoni

Binomial name
- Storrsia olsoni C. E. Dawson, 1982

Genus of fishes

Storrsia olsoni is a species of sand stargazer native to the Atlantic coast of Brazil, being endemic to Atol das Rocas and Fernando de Noronha, where it can be found in tide pools at depths of from 0 to 1 metre (0.0 to 3.3 ft). It can reach a maximum length of 3 centimetres (1.2 in) SL. It is currently the only known member of its genus.

== Etymology ==
The binomial name of this species honours the collector of the type, the ornithologist Storrs Olson of the National Museum of Natural History.
