= Myxodagnus macrognathus =

Conservation status
- Least Concern (IUCN 3.1)

Scientific classification
- Kingdom: Animalia
- Phylum: Chordata
- Class: Actinopterygii
- Order: Blenniiformes
- Family: Dactyloscopidae
- Genus: Myxodagnus
- Species: M. macrognathus

Binomial name
- Myxodagnus macrognathus Hildebrand, 1946

Species of fish

Myxodagnus macrognathus is a species of sand stargazer that is known to occur off the Pacific coasts of Mexico and Peru. It can reach a maximum length of 6 centimetres (2.4 in) SL.
