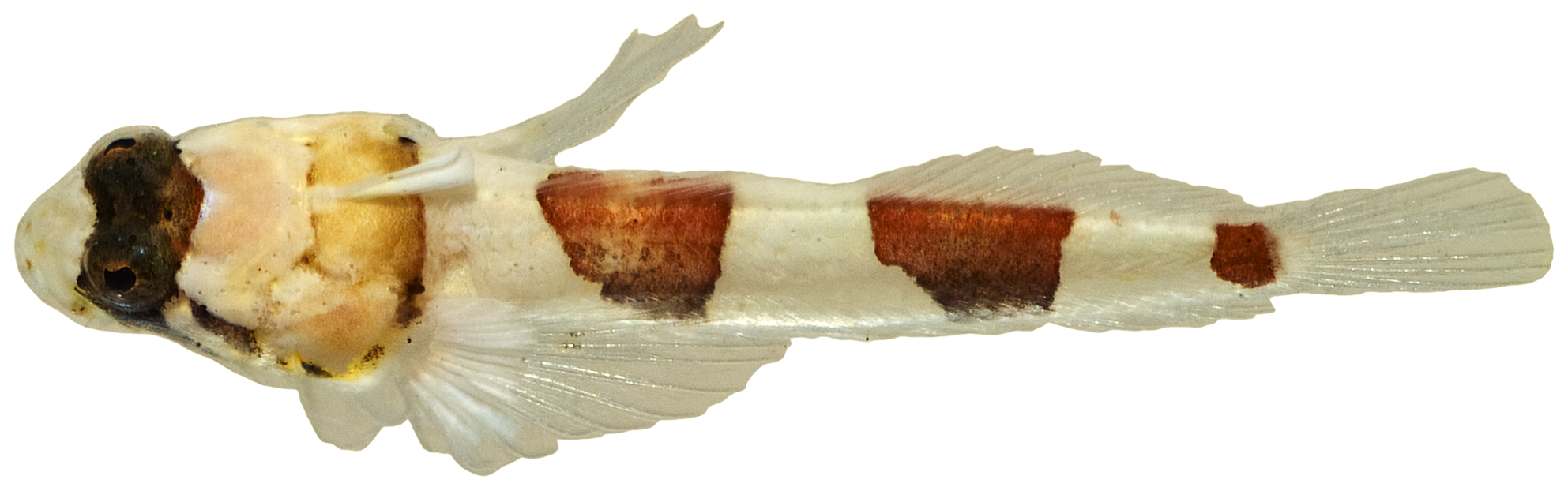
- Platygillellus rubrocinctus

Conservation status
- Least Concern (IUCN 3.1)

Scientific classification
- Kingdom: Animalia
- Phylum: Chordata
- Class: Actinopterygii
- Order: Blenniiformes
- Family: Dactyloscopidae
- Genus: Platygillellus
- Species: P. rubrocinctus

Binomial name
- Platygillellus rubrocinctus (Longley, 1934)

Synonyms
- Gillellus rubrocinctus Longley, 1934; Heteristius rubrocinctus (Longely, 1934); Gillellus quadricinctus Beebe & Hollister, 1935

= Platygillellus rubrocinctus =

Species of fish

Platygillellus rubrocinctus, commonly known as Saddle stargazer, is a species of sand stargazer native to the Atlantic, Gulf, and Caribbean waters from southern Florida, United States, and the Bahamas to Panama. It prefers rubble or sandy substrates near rocky areas and reefs, inhabiting depths from 0 to 30 metres (0 to 98 ft). The species can reach a maximum total length (TL) of 6.4 centimetres (2.5 in) TL.
