= Gillellus jacksoni =

Conservation status
- Least Concern (IUCN 3.1)

Scientific classification
- Kingdom: Animalia
- Phylum: Chordata
- Class: Actinopterygii
- Order: Blenniiformes
- Family: Dactyloscopidae
- Genus: Gillellus
- Species: G. jacksoni

Binomial name
- Gillellus jacksoni C. E. Dawson, 1982

Species of fish

Gillellus jacksoni is a species of sand stargazer native to the Antilles where it can be found at depths of from 0 to 17 metres (0 to 56 ft). It can reach a maximum length of 2.5 centimetres (0.98 in) SL.

== Etymology ==
The specific name honours Felix N. Jackson who was a Museum Technician at the Gulf Coast Research Laboratory in Ocean Springs, Mississippi.
