= Festucalex prolixus =

Conservation status
- Data Deficient (IUCN 3.1)

Scientific classification
- Kingdom: Animalia
- Phylum: Chordata
- Class: Actinopterygii
- Order: Syngnathiformes
- Family: Syngnathidae
- Genus: Festucalex
- Species: F. prolixus

Binomial name
- Festucalex prolixus Dawson, 1984

Species of fish

Festucalex prolixus is a species of marine fish of the family Syngnathidae. It is found in the Western Central Pacific, from the Sulu-Celebes Sea and around west Papua New Guinea, Indonesia, including Cenderawasih Bay. Known specimens come from trawls of 0–167 metres (0–548 ft), so it is thought to inhabit waters deeper than 40 metres (130 ft). Very little is known about this species, but it is expected to be ovoviviparous and to feed on small crustaceans.
