= Dactyloscopus moorei =

Conservation status
- Least Concern (IUCN 3.1)

Scientific classification
- Kingdom: Animalia
- Phylum: Chordata
- Class: Actinopterygii
- Order: Blenniiformes
- Family: Dactyloscopidae
- Genus: Dactyloscopus
- Species: D. moorei

Binomial name
- Dactyloscopus moorei (Fowler, 1906)

Synonyms
- Congrammus moorei Fowler, 1906

Species of fish

Dactyloscopus moorei, the speckled stargazer, is a species of sand stargazer native to the Atlantic and Gulf coasts of the United States. From North Carolina to Texas it can be found on sandy bottoms at depths of from 3 to 35 metres (9.8 to 114.8 ft). This species can reach a length of 8 centimetres (3.1 in) TL. The specific name honours the American archaeologist Clarence Bloomfield Moore (1852-1936).
