= Myxodagnus opercularis =

Conservation status
- Least Concern (IUCN 3.1)

Scientific classification
- Kingdom: Animalia
- Phylum: Chordata
- Class: Actinopterygii
- Order: Blenniiformes
- Family: Dactyloscopidae
- Genus: Myxodagnus
- Species: M. opercularis

Binomial name
- Myxodagnus opercularis T. N. Gill, 1861

Species of fish

Myxodagnus opercularis, the Dart stargazer, is a species of sand stargazer native to the coastal waters of Baja California Sur, Mexico where it can be found on sandy bottoms.
