= Gillellus healae =

Conservation status
- Least Concern (IUCN 3.1)

Scientific classification
- Kingdom: Animalia
- Phylum: Chordata
- Class: Actinopterygii
- Order: Blenniiformes
- Family: Dactyloscopidae
- Genus: Gillellus
- Species: G. healae

Binomial name
- Gillellus healae C. E. Dawson, 1982

Species of fish

Gillellus healae, the masked stargazer, is a species of sand stargazer native to the Atlantic and Gulf coasts of the United States from South Carolina to the Florida Keys as well as around Aruba where it can be found on sandy bottoms at depths of from 21 to 37 metres (69 to 121 ft). It is an ambush predator, burying itself nearly completely in the sand and waiting for prey to happen by. This species can reach a length of 7.5 centimetres (3.0 in) TL.

== Etymology ==
The specific name honours Elizabeth Heal who was Technical Secretary at the Gulf Coast Research Laboratory in Ocean Springs, Mississippi.
