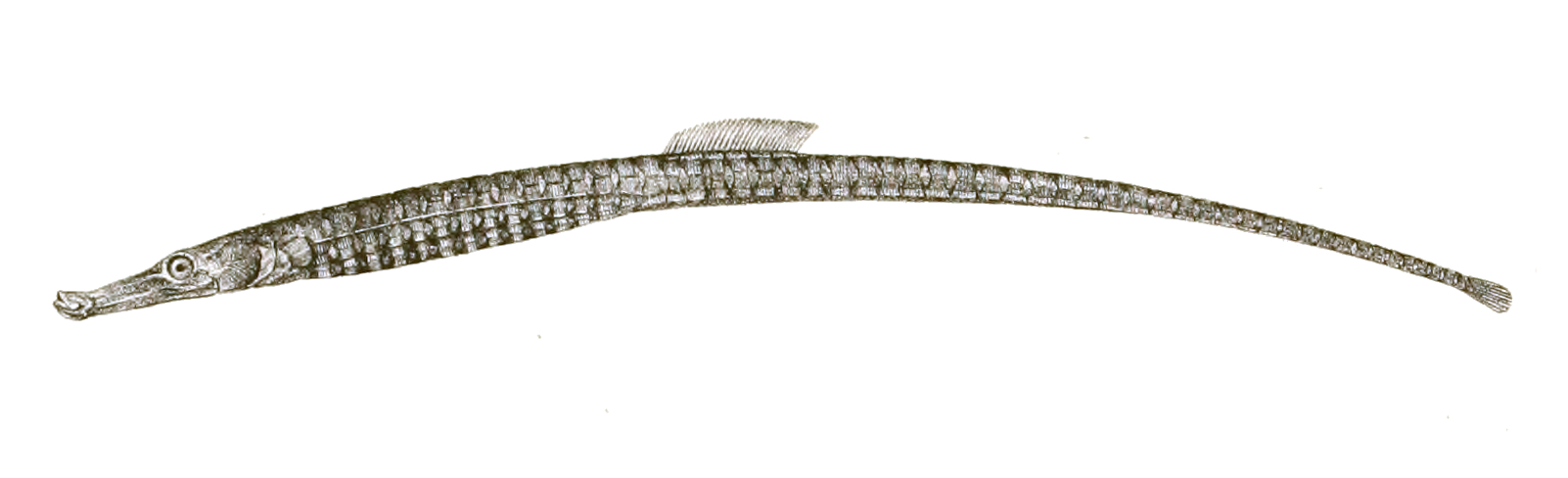
- H. spicifer

Scientific classification
- Domain: Eukaryota
- Kingdom: Animalia
- Phylum: Chordata
- Class: Actinopterygii
- Order: Syngnathiformes
- Family: Syngnathidae
- Subfamily: Syngnathinae
- Genus: Hippichthys; Bleeker, 1849

Type species
- Hippichthys heptagonus Bleeker, 1849

Synonyms
- Bombonia Herre, 1927; Oxleyana Whitley, 1937; Parasyngnathus Duncker, 1915

= Hippichthys =

Genus of fishes

Hippichthys is a genus of pipefishes native to the Indian and Pacific Oceans and the landmasses around them. This genus contains freshwater, brackish water and marine species.

== Species ==
There are currently six recognized species in this genus:

- Hippichthys albomaculosus A. P. Jenkins & Mailautoka, 2010
- Hippichthys cyanospilos (Bleeker, 1854) (Blue-spotted pipefish)
- Hippichthys heptagonus Bleeker, 1849 (Belly pipefish)
- Hippichthys parvicarinatus (C. E. Dawson, 1978) (Short-keel pipefish)
- Hippichthys penicillus (Cantor, 1849) (Beady pipefish)
- Hippichthys spicifer (Rüppell, 1838) (Bellybarred pipefish)
