= Gillellus ornatus =

Conservation status
- Least Concern (IUCN 3.1)

Scientific classification
- Kingdom: Animalia
- Phylum: Chordata
- Class: Actinopterygii
- Division: Teleostei
- Order: Blenniiformes
- Family: Dactyloscopidae
- Genus: Gillellus
- Species: G. ornatus

Binomial name
- Gillellus ornatus C. H. Gilbert, 1892

Species of fish

Gillellus ornatus, the Ornate stargazer, is a species of sand stargazer native to the Gulf of California. It can reach a maximum length of 5 centimetres (2.0 in).
