= Festucalex gibbsi =

Gibbs' pipefish

Conservation status
- Least Concern (IUCN 3.1)

Scientific classification
- Kingdom: Animalia
- Phylum: Chordata
- Class: Actinopterygii
- Order: Syngnathiformes
- Family: Syngnathidae
- Genus: Festucalex
- Species: F. gibbsi

Binomial name
- Festucalex gibbsi Dawson, 1977

Species of fish

Gibbs’ pipefish (Festucalex gibbsi) is a species of marine fish of the family Syngnathidae. It is found in the Western Pacific, from the Great Barrier Reef to Palau, the Chesterfield Islands and New Caledonia. Unconfirmed specimens have been reported off of the Seychelles in the Indian Ocean. It lives in coastal sandy or rubble habitats, as well as areas with sponges and coralline algae, where it can grow to lengths of 8 centimetres (3.1 in). It is expected to feed on small crustaceans, similar to other pipefish. This species is ovoviviparous, with males brooding eggs and giving birth to live young. Males may brood at lengths of around 5 centimetres (2.0 in). The specific name honours P. E. Gibbs, who collected the type material.

== Identifying Features ==
F. gibbsi is typically brownish, with a pale snout, tan and brown blotches on the head, and an indistinctly barred trunk. It often has an iridescent white bar below the opercular ridge, a brownish back and sides, and a brownish caudal fin with a pale margin.
