= Festucalex wassi =

Wass's pipefish

Conservation status
- Data Deficient (IUCN 3.1)

Scientific classification
- Kingdom: Animalia
- Phylum: Chordata
- Class: Actinopterygii
- Order: Syngnathiformes
- Family: Syngnathidae
- Genus: Festucalex
- Species: F. wassi

Binomial name
- Festucalex wassi Dawson, 1977

Species of fish

Wass's pipefish (Festucalex wassi) is a species of marine fish of the family Syngnathidae. It is known from only six species, which were found in the coastal waters of Papua New Guinea, New Caledonia, Fiji, and Samoa. It inhabits soft coral habitats and coral rubble to depths of 50 metres (160 ft), where it can grow to lengths of 7.4 centimetres (2.9 in). Little is known of the species' feeding habits, but it is expected to eat small crustaceans, similar to other pipefish. This species is ovoviviparous, with males carrying eggs and giving birth to live young. The specific name honours the U.S. Fish & Wildlife Service biologist Richard C. Wass.
