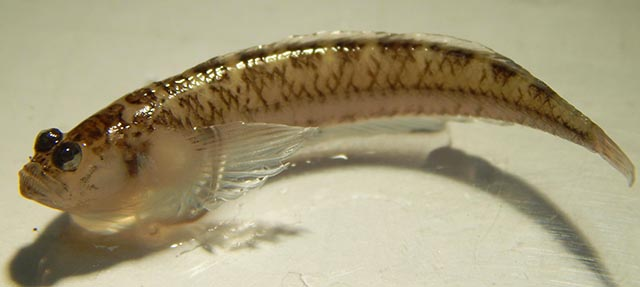

Conservation status
- Least Concern (IUCN 3.1)

Scientific classification
- Kingdom: Animalia
- Phylum: Chordata
- Class: Actinopterygii
- Order: Blenniiformes
- Family: Dactyloscopidae
- Genus: Dactyloscopus
- Species: D. crossotus

Binomial name
- Dactyloscopus crossotus Starks, 1913

Synonyms
- Springeria santosi J. de P. Carvalho & S. Y. Pinto, 1965; Jopaica santosi (J. de P. Carvalho & S. Y. Pinto, 1965); Paramyxodagnus moreirai J. de P. Carvalho & S. Y. Pinto, 1965; Paramyxodagnus mangaratibensis J. de P. Carvalho & S. Y. Pinto, 1965

= Dactyloscopus crossotus =

Species of fish

Dactyloscopus crossotus, the bigeye stargazer, is a species of sand stargazer native to the coastal Atlantic waters of Florida, United States and from the Bahamas to Brazil where it prefers sandy beaches at depths of from 0 to 3 metres (0.0 to 9.8 ft), occasionally down to 8 metres (26 ft). It buries itself in the sand to ambush prey, leaving only its eyes, mouth and nose exposed. It can reach a maximum length of 7.5 centimetres (3.0 in) TL.
