= Dactyloscopus lunaticus =

Conservation status
- Least Concern (IUCN 3.1)

Scientific classification
- Kingdom: Animalia
- Phylum: Chordata
- Class: Actinopterygii
- Order: Blenniiformes
- Family: Dactyloscopidae
- Genus: Dactyloscopus
- Species: D. lunaticus

Binomial name
- Dactyloscopus lunaticus C. H. Gilbert, 1890

Species of fish

Dactyloscopus lunaticus, the moonstruck stargazer, is a species of sand stargazer native to the Pacific coast of Central America from southern Baja California to the Gulf of Panama where it can be found at depths down to 60 metres (200 ft).
