= Dactyloscopus poeyi =

Conservation status
- Least Concern (IUCN 3.1)

Scientific classification
- Kingdom: Animalia
- Phylum: Chordata
- Class: Actinopterygii
- Order: Blenniiformes
- Family: Dactyloscopidae
- Genus: Dactyloscopus
- Species: D. poeyi

Binomial name
- Dactyloscopus poeyi T. N. Gill, 1861

Species of fish

Dactyloscopus poeyi, the shortchin stargazer, is a species of sand stargazer native to the coasts of the Bahamas, the Antilles and the Caribbean coast of Central and South America from Belize to Venezuela. It can be found on sandy substrates at depths of from 0 to 9 metres (0 to 30 ft). It can reach a maximum length of 5.8 centimetres (2.3 in) SL. The specific name honours the Cuban ichthyologist Felipe Poey (1799-1891).
