= Dactyloscopus pectoralis =

Conservation status
- Least Concern (IUCN 3.1)

Scientific classification
- Kingdom: Animalia
- Phylum: Chordata
- Class: Actinopterygii
- Order: Blenniiformes
- Family: Dactyloscopidae
- Genus: Dactyloscopus
- Species: D. pectoralis

Binomial name
- Dactyloscopus pectoralis T. N. Gill, 1861

Synonyms
- Dactyloscopus pectoralis pectoralis T. N. Gill, 1861

Species of fish

Dactyloscopus pectoralis, the whitesaddle stargazer, is a species of sand stargazer native to the Pacific coast of Baja California, Mexico and the Gulf of Mexico. The marine fish can reach a maximum length of 5.2 centimetres (2.0 in) TL.
