= Gillellus arenicola =

Conservation status
- Least Concern (IUCN 3.1)

Scientific classification
- Kingdom: Animalia
- Phylum: Chordata
- Class: Actinopterygii
- Order: Blenniiformes
- Family: Dactyloscopidae
- Genus: Gillellus
- Species: G. arenicola

Binomial name
- Gillellus arenicola C. H. Gilbert, 1890

Species of fish

Gillellus arenicola, the sandy stargazer, is a species of sand stargazer native to the Pacific coast of Central America from Baja California, Mexico, to Panama where it can be found on sandy substrates at depths of from 8 to 137 metres (26 to 449 ft). It can reach a maximum length of 5.5 centimetres (2.2 in) TL.
