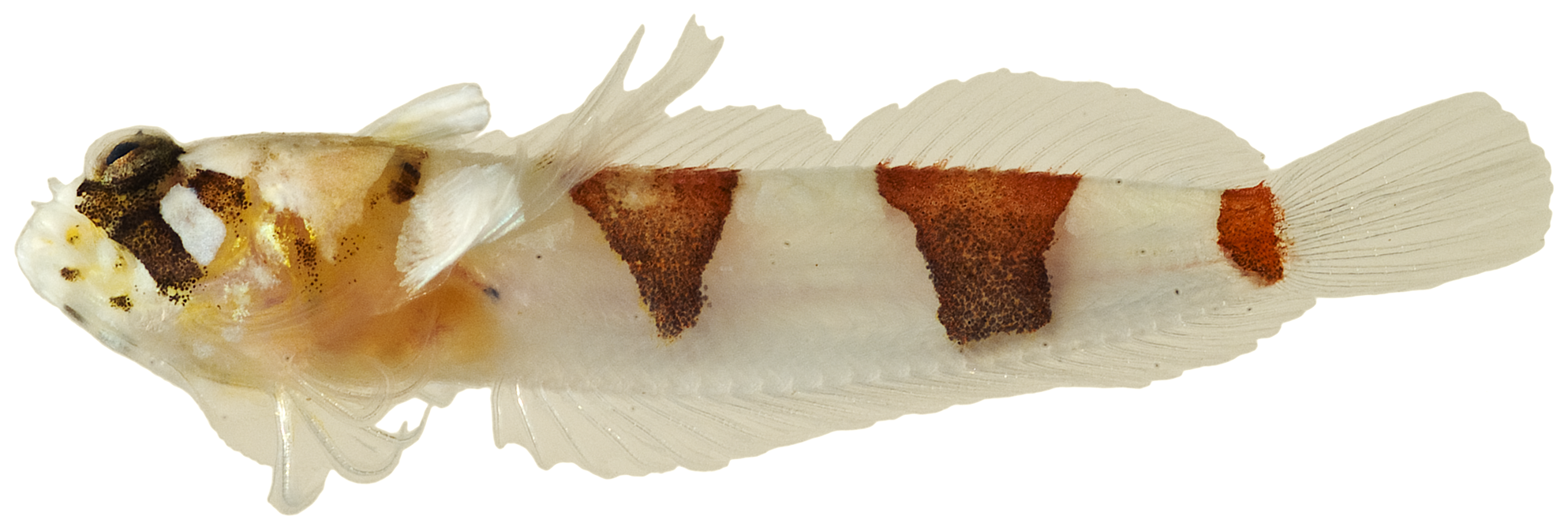
- Platygillellus rubrocinctus

Scientific classification
- Kingdom: Animalia
- Phylum: Chordata
- Class: Actinopterygii
- Order: Blenniiformes
- Family: Dactyloscopidae
- Genus: Platygillellus; C. E. Dawson, 1974

Type species
- Gillelus rubellulus Kendall & Radcliffe, 1912

= Platygillellus =

Genus of fishes

Platygillellus is a genus of sand stargazers native to the Atlantic and Pacific coasts of the Americas.

== Species ==
There are currently six recognized species in this genus:

- Platygillellus altivelis C. E. Dawson, 1974 (Sailfin stargazer)
- Platygillellus brasiliensis Feitoza, 2002 (Brazilian sand stargazer)
- Platygillellus bussingi C. E. Dawson, 1974 (Bussing's stargazer)
- Platygillellus rubellulus (Kendall & Radcliffe, 1912) (Shortfin sand stargazer)
- Platygillellus rubrocinctus (Longley, 1934) (Saddle stargazer)
- Platygillellus smithi C. E. Dawson, 1982
