= Sindoscopus =

Conservation status
- Least Concern (IUCN 3.1)

Scientific classification
- Kingdom: Animalia
- Phylum: Chordata
- Class: Actinopterygii
- Order: Blenniiformes
- Family: Dactyloscopidae
- Genus: Sindoscopus; C. E. Dawson, 1977
- Species: S. australis

Binomial name
- Sindoscopus australis (Fowler & B. A. Bean, 1923)

Synonyms
- Gillellus australis Fowler & B. A. Bean, 1923

Genus of fishes

Sindoscopus australis is a species of sand stargazer native to the Pacific coast of Chile where it can be found in shallow waters with a sandy substrate. It is currently the only known member of its genus.

== Etymology ==
The generic name is a compound noun the first part of which honours Charles E. Dawson's companion in the field and collector of the type, the Chilean zoologist Gumersindo Revuelta and the second part is Latinised Greek skopos, "watcher".
