= Campichthys tricarinatus =

Three-keel pipefish

Conservation status
- Data Deficient (IUCN 3.1)

Scientific classification
- Kingdom: Animalia
- Phylum: Chordata
- Class: Actinopterygii
- Order: Syngnathiformes
- Family: Syngnathidae
- Genus: Campichthys
- Species: C. tricarinatus

Binomial name
- Campichthys tricarinatus Dawson, 1977

Species of fish

Campichthys tricarinatus (three-keel pipefish) is a species of marine fish of the family Syngnathidae. It is found in the western central Pacific Ocean, from Montebello Island (Western Australia) to Cape York (Queensland), and specimens have been recorded around the Northern Mariana and Marshall Islands. It is found at depths of 3–11 metres (9.8–36.1 ft), and can grow to lengths of 4.4 centimetres (1.7 in). This species is ovoviviparous, with males carrying eggs in a brood pouch until giving birth to live young.
