= Anarchopterus tectus =

Conservation status
- Least Concern (IUCN 3.1)

Scientific classification
- Kingdom: Animalia
- Phylum: Chordata
- Class: Actinopterygii
- Order: Syngnathiformes
- Family: Syngnathidae
- Genus: Anarchopterus
- Species: A. tectus

Binomial name
- Anarchopterus tectus (Dawson, 1978)

Synonyms
- Micrognathus tectus Dawson, 1978

Species of fish

Anarchopterus tectus, also known as the insular pipefish, is a marine fish of the family Syngnathidae. It is found in the western Atlantic Ocean, from Florida to the Bahamas and Argentina, and off the coast of South America to Bahia, Brazil. It inhabits turtle grass beds and rocky algae reefs, at depths of 10-25m, where it can grow to lengths of 12.5 cm. This species is ovoviviparous, with the males carrying eggs in their brood pouch before giving birth to live young.
