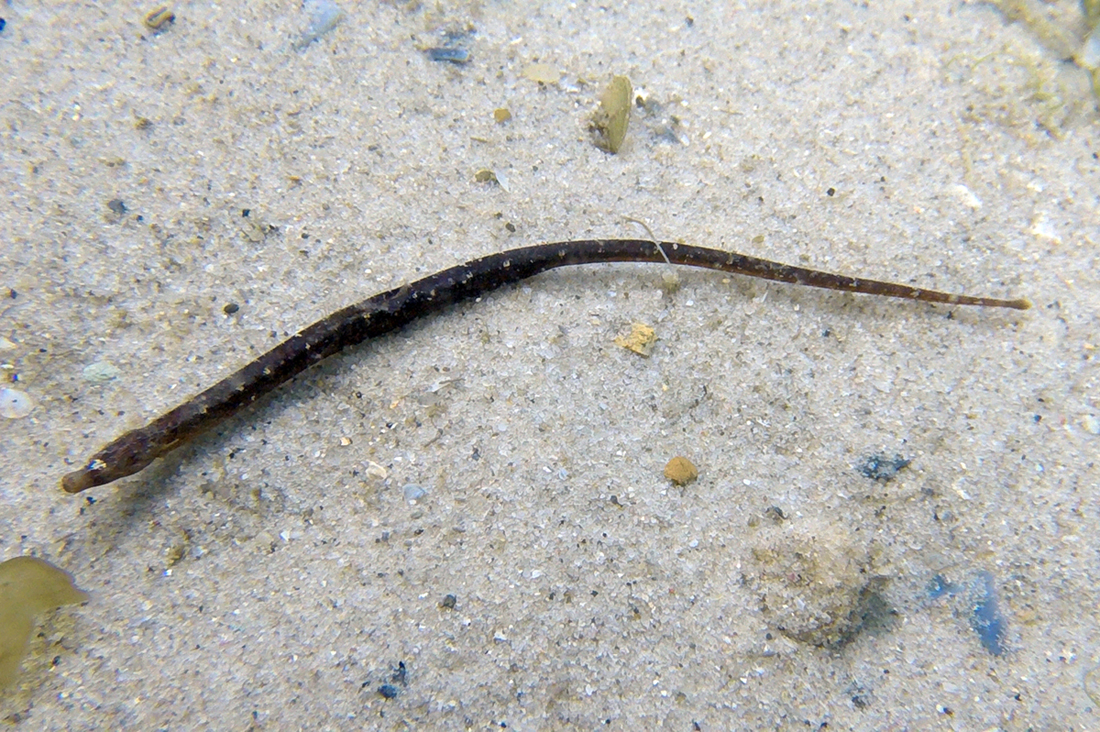
- Campichthys tryoni

Scientific classification
- Kingdom: Animalia
- Phylum: Chordata
- Class: Actinopterygii
- Order: Syngnathiformes
- Family: Syngnathidae
- Subfamily: Syngnathinae
- Genus: Campichthys; Whitley, 1931

Type species
- Ichthyocampus tryoni Ogilby, 1890

Synonyms
- Larvicampus Whitley, 1948

= Campichthys =

Genus of fishes

Campichthys is a genus of pipefishes native to the Indian and Pacific Oceans.

== Species ==
There are currently four recognized species in this genus:

- Campichthys galei (Duncker, 1909) (Gale's pipefish)
- Campichthys nanus C. E. Dawson, 1977
- Campichthys tricarinatus C. E. Dawson, 1977 (Three-keel pipefish)
- Campichthys tryoni (J. D. Ogilby, 1890) (Tryon's pipefish)
