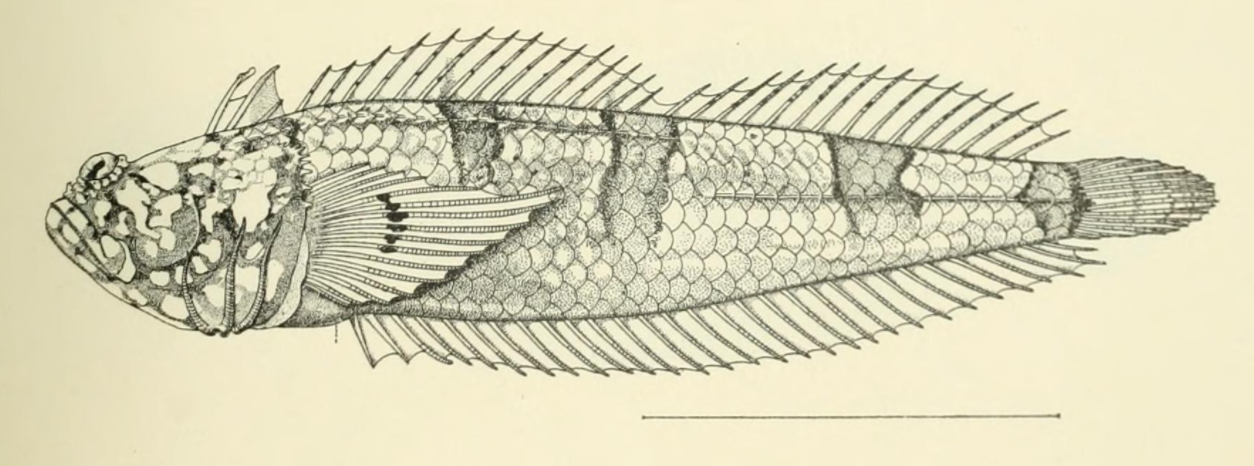

Conservation status
- Vulnerable (IUCN 3.1)

Scientific classification
- Kingdom: Animalia
- Phylum: Chordata
- Class: Actinopterygii
- Order: Blenniiformes
- Family: Dactyloscopidae
- Genus: Platygillellus
- Species: P. rubellulus

Binomial name
- Platygillellus rubellulus (Kendall & Radcliffe, 1912)

Synonyms
- Gillellus rubellulus Kendall & Radcliffe, 1912

= Platygillellus rubellulus =

Species of fish

Platygillellus rubellulus, the Shortfin sand stargazer, is a species of sand stargazer endemic native to the waters around the Galapagos Islands where it prefers to live in areas of fine-grained sediments at depths of from 0 to 20 metres (0 to 66 ft). It can reach a maximum length of 6.2 centimetres (2.4 in) SL.
