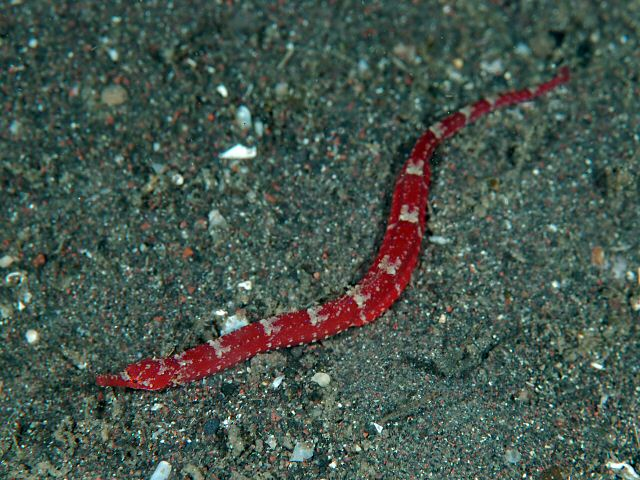
- Festucalex erythraeus

Scientific classification
- Kingdom: Animalia
- Phylum: Chordata
- Class: Actinopterygii
- Order: Syngnathiformes
- Family: Syngnathidae
- Subfamily: Syngnathinae
- Genus: Festucalex; Whitley, 1931

Type species
- Syngnathus cinctus Ramsay, 1882

= Festucalex =

Genus of fishes

Festucalex is a genus of fish in the family Syngnathidae native to the Indian and Pacific Ocean.

== Species ==
There are currently 11 recognized species in this genus:

- Festucalex amakusensis (Tomiyama, 1972)
- Festucalex armillatus Prokofiev, 2016
- Festucalex cinctus (E. P. Ramsay, 1882) (Girdled pipefish)
- Festucalex erythraeus (C. H. Gilbert, 1905)
- Festucalex gibbsi C. E. Dawson, 1977 (Gibbs' pipefish)
- Festucalex kulbickii R. Fricke, 2004 (Kulbicki's pipefish)
- Festucalex prolixus C. E. Dawson, 1984
- Festucalex rufus G. R. Allen & Erdmann, 2015 (Pink pipefish)
- Festucalex scalaris (Günther, 1870) (Ladder pipefish)
- Festucalex townsendi (Duncker, 1915)
- Festucalex wassi C. E. Dawson, 1977 (Wass' pipefish)
