= Anarchopterus =

Scientific classification
- Kingdom: Animalia
- Phylum: Chordata
- Class: Actinopterygii
- Order: Syngnathiformes
- Family: Syngnathidae
- Subfamily: Syngnathinae
- Genus: Anarchopterus; C. L. Hubbs, 1935

Type species
- Siphostoma crinigerum Bean & Dresel, 1884

Synonyms
- Simosyngnathus Fowler, 1940

Genus of fishes

Anarchopterus is a genus of pipefishes native to the western Atlantic Ocean.

== Species ==
There are currently two recognized species in this genus:

- Anarchopterus criniger (T. H. Bean & Dresel, 1884) (Fringed pipefish)
- Anarchopterus tectus (C. E. Dawson, 1978) (Insular pipefish)
