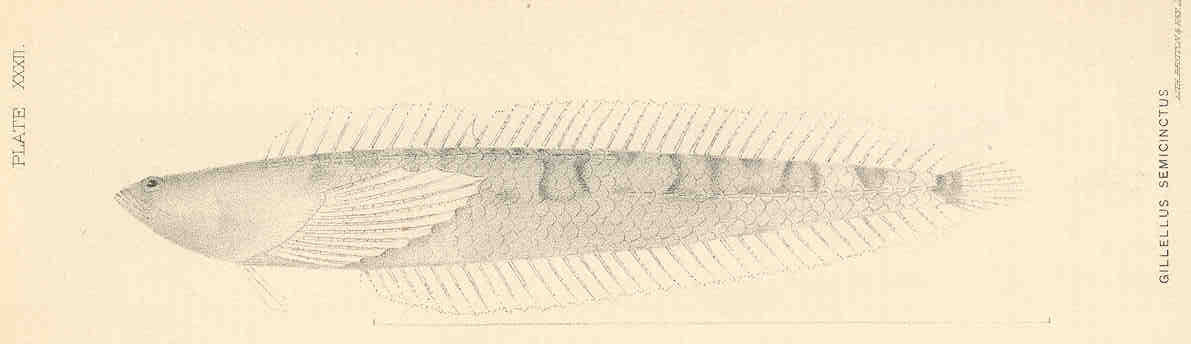

Conservation status
- Least Concern (IUCN 3.1)

Scientific classification
- Kingdom: Animalia
- Phylum: Chordata
- Class: Actinopterygii
- Order: Blenniiformes
- Family: Dactyloscopidae
- Genus: Gillellus
- Species: G. semicinctus

Binomial name
- Gillellus semicinctus C. H. Gilbert, 1890

= Gillellus semicinctus =

Species of fish

Gillellus semicinctus, the half-banded stargazer, is a species of sand stargazer native to the Pacific coast of the Americas from the Gulf of California to Colombia, as well as occurring in the Galapagos Islands. It can be found on sandy substrates at depths of from 5 to 140 metres (16 to 459 ft). It can reach a maximum length of 5.2 centimetres (2.0 in) TL.
