= Red pipefish =

Red pipefish may refer to one of the following species of fish:

- Notiocampus ruber
- Festucalex erythraeus
- Microphis mento
