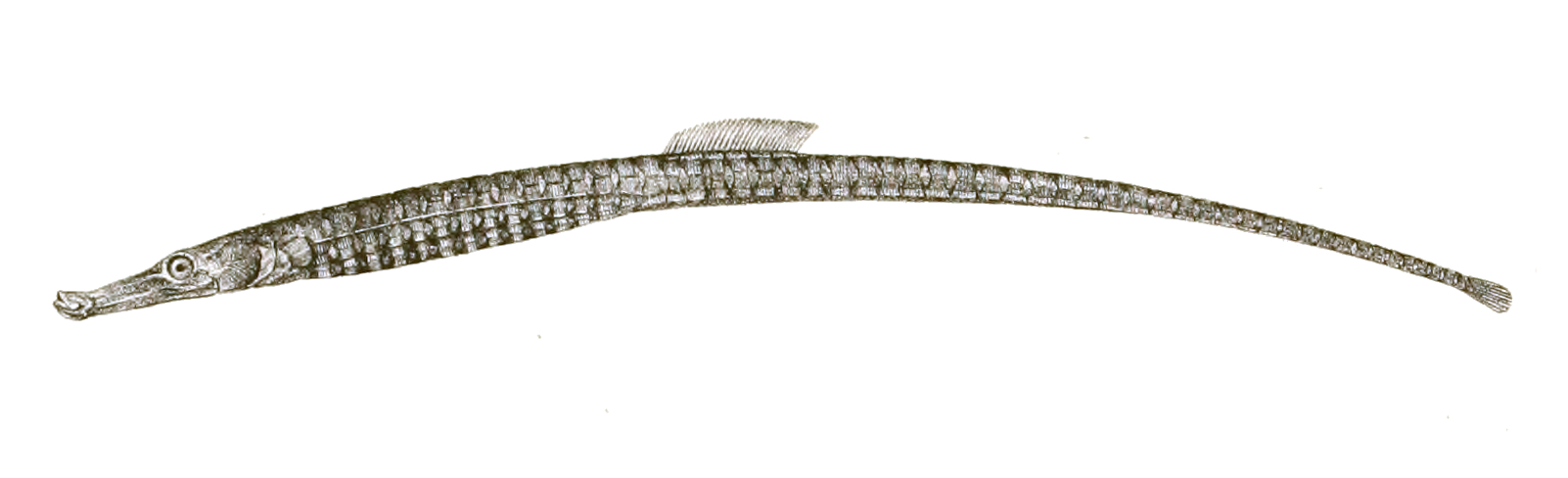

Conservation status
- Least Concern (IUCN 3.1)

Scientific classification
- Kingdom: Animalia
- Phylum: Chordata
- Class: Actinopterygii
- Division: Teleostei
- Order: Syngnathiformes
- Family: Syngnathidae
- Genus: Hippichthys
- Species: H. spicifer

Binomial name
- Hippichthys spicifer Rüppell, 1838

Synonyms
- Micrognathus suvensis Herre, 1935; Microphis tenuis Blyth, 1858; Syngnathus gastrotaenia Bleeker, 1852; Syngnathus gracilis Steindachner, 1901; Syngnathus hunnii Bleeker, 1860; Syngnathus perlatus Lay & Bennett, 1839; Syngnathus spicifer Rüppell, 1838; Syngnathus tapeinosoma Bleeker, 1854

= Hippichthys spicifer =

Bellybarred pipefish

Species of fish

Hippichthys spicifer, commonly known as bellybarred pipefish, banded freshwater pipefish, or blue spotted pipefish, is a species of pipefish of the family Syngnathidae. It is found in the Indo-Pacific, from the Red Sea and East Africa to Sri Lanka and Samoa. It lives in shallow coastal and estuarine habitats such as mangroves, tidal creeks, and the lower reaches of rivers, where it can grow to lengths of 18 centimetres (7.1 in). It is expected to feed on small crustaceans and mosquito larvae. This species is ovoviviparous, with males brooding eggs in a brood pouch before giving birth to live young. It is reproductively active all year, with males and females reaching sexual maturity at 10.8 and 10 centimetres (4.3 and 3.9 in) respectively. Brood size can vary significantly, from 114 to 1764, with an average of 604.4 plus or minus 322.8.

== Identification ==
H. spicifer has a brownish to red back, a bluish stomach, and fine brown and pale mottling. The underside of the front of the body usually has a series of brown to blue bars interspersed with yellow to white bars. The lower part of the head usually has black dots.
