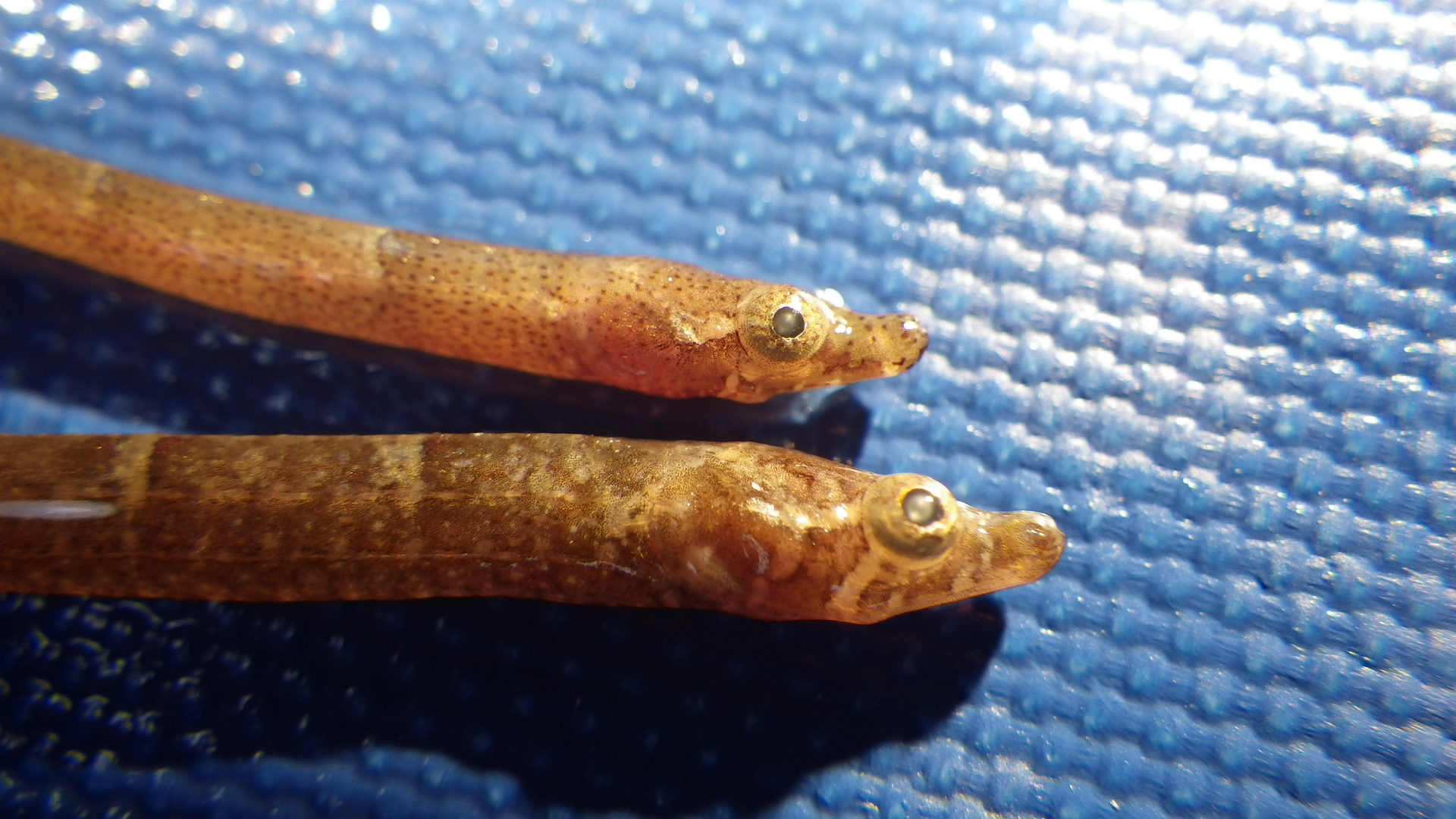

Conservation status
- Least Concern (IUCN 3.1)

Scientific classification
- Kingdom: Animalia
- Phylum: Chordata
- Class: Actinopterygii
- Order: Syngnathiformes
- Family: Syngnathidae
- Genus: Anarchopterus
- Species: A. criniger

Binomial name
- Anarchopterus criniger Bean & Dresel, 1884

Synonyms
- Siphostoma crinigerum Bean & Dresel, 1884; Micrognathus criniger (Bean & Dresel, 1884)

= Anarchopterus criniger =

Species of fish

Anarchopterus criniger, also known as the fringed pipefish, is a species of marine fish of the family Syngnathidae. It is found in the western Atlantic Ocean from North Carolina to Florida and the northern Bahamas, in the Gulf of Mexico from Louisiana to the Florida Keys, and along the Yucatán Peninsula in Mexico. It also occurs along the whole coast of Brazil. It lives in shallow waters over seagrass beds, mud banks, and floating algae, and can grow to a length of 10 cm. This species is ovoviviparous, with the male carrying eggs in a brood pouch until they are ready to hatch.
