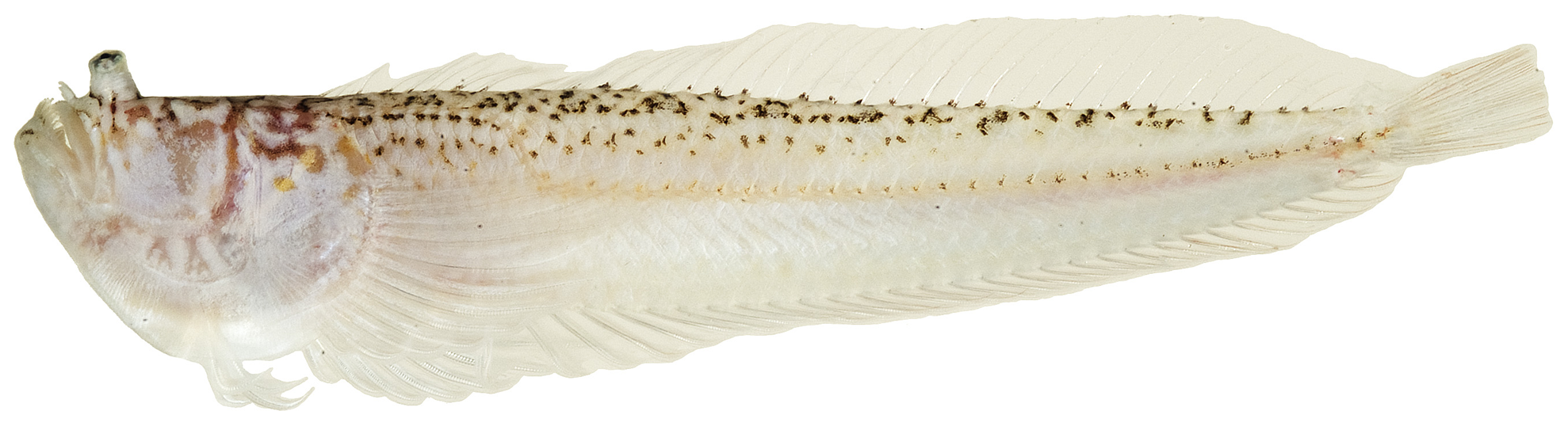

Conservation status
- Least Concern (IUCN 3.1)

Scientific classification
- Kingdom: Animalia
- Phylum: Chordata
- Class: Actinopterygii
- Order: Blenniiformes
- Family: Dactyloscopidae
- Genus: Dactyloscopus
- Species: D. tridigitatus

Binomial name
- Dactyloscopus tridigitatus T. N. Gill, 1859

Synonyms
- Cokeridia kathetostoma J. de P. Carvalho, 1957; Dactyloscopus kathetostomus (J. de P. Carvalho, 1957); Paragillelus macropoma J. de P. Carvalho & S. Y. Pinto, 1965; Tamandareia oliveirai J. de P. Carvalho & S. Y. Pinto, 1965

= Dactyloscopus tridigitatus =

Species of fish

Dactyloscopus tridigitatus, the sand stargazer, is a species of sand stargazer native to the Atlantic coasts of the Americas from Florida, United States to Brazil as well as in the Caribbean Ocean and the Gulf of Mexico. It is found in sandy areas around reefs at depths of from 0 to 29 metres (0 to 95 ft). It is an ambush predator, burying itself nearly completely in the sand and attacking prey animals that happen by. It can reach a maximum length of 9 centimetres (3.5 in) TL.
