= Festucalex scalaris =

Ladder pipefish

Conservation status
- Least Concern (IUCN 3.1)

Scientific classification
- Domain: Eukaryota
- Kingdom: Animalia
- Phylum: Chordata
- Class: Actinopterygii
- Order: Syngnathiformes
- Family: Syngnathidae
- Genus: Festucalex
- Species: F. scalaris

Binomial name
- Festucalex scalaris Günther, 1870

Synonyms
- Ichthyocampus scalaris Günther, 1870

Species of fish

The ladder pipefish (Festucalex scalaris) is a species of marine fish of the family Syngnathidae. It is endemic to Western Australia, occurring from Shark Bay to the Monte Bello Islands. It is a habitat generalist, with species samples being taken from trawls, from among weeds and algae and one sample from a pond. It is reported to occur on rocky-reefs in inlets, bays and lagoons, as well as shallow seagrass beds. It is expected to feed on small crustaceans, and can grow to lengths of 18 centimetres (7.1 in). This species is ovoviviparous, with males brooding eggs and giving birth to live young.

== Identification ==
F. scalaris has a light tan upper snout, while the rest of the head is mainly tan to light brown. The lower half of the snout and head have irregular small brown dots. The back and sides of the body have 13-14 brownish bars, which are separated by narrow pale interspaces that can be plain, blotched, or have fine brown reticulations. The caudal fin is brownish with pale spots or blotches.
