= Festucalex rufus =

Pink pipefish

Conservation status
- Data Deficient (IUCN 3.1)

Scientific classification
- Kingdom: Animalia
- Phylum: Chordata
- Class: Actinopterygii
- Order: Syngnathiformes
- Family: Syngnathidae
- Genus: Festucalex
- Species: F. rufus

Binomial name
- Festucalex rufus Allen & Erdmann, 2015

Species of fish

The pink pipefish (Festucalex rufus) is a species of coastal pipefish of the family Syngnathidae. It has been found in the East Cape area of Milne Bay, Papua New Guinea, as well as the Solomon Islands, Bali, and Seram Island. It lives in sponges on coral reef slopes at depths of 10–25 metres (33–82 ft), where it can grow to lengths generally less than 4 centimetres (1.6 in). They are found solitary or in pairs, always on an unidentified red tubular sponge which provides them with camouflage. They are expected to feed on small crustaceans, similar to other pipefish. This species is ovoviviparous, with males brooding eggs and giving birth to live young.
