= Campichthys galei =

Gale's pipefish

Conservation status
- Least Concern (IUCN 3.1)

Scientific classification
- Kingdom: Animalia
- Phylum: Chordata
- Class: Actinopterygii
- Order: Syngnathiformes
- Family: Syngnathidae
- Genus: Campichthys
- Species: C. galei

Binomial name
- Campichthys galei (Duncker, 1909)

Synonyms
- Ichthyocampus galei Duncker, 1909

Species of fish

Campichthys galei (Gale's pipefish) is a species of marine fish of the family Syngnathidae. It is endemic to Australia, found from Shark Bay (Western Australia) to the Spencer Gulf (South Australia) on the rubble bottom of inshore waters to depths of 18m. It can grow to lengths of 6 centimetres (2.4 in). This species is ovoviviparous, with the males carrying eggs in a brood pouch until they are ready to hatch.
