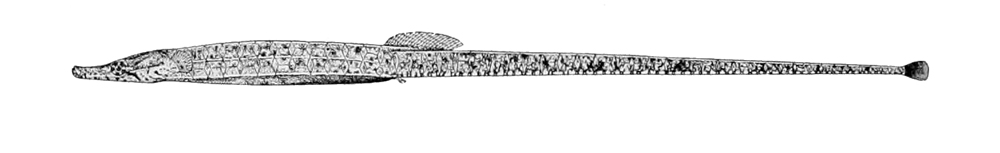

Conservation status
- Least Concern (IUCN 3.1)

Scientific classification
- Kingdom: Animalia
- Phylum: Chordata
- Class: Actinopterygii
- Order: Syngnathiformes
- Family: Syngnathidae
- Genus: Hippichthys
- Species: H. cyanospilos

Binomial name
- Hippichthys cyanospilos (Bleeker, 1854)

Synonyms
- Doryichthys spaniaspis Jordan & Seale, 1907; Parasyngnathus wardi Whitley, 1948; Syngnathus cyanospilos Bleeker, 1854; Syngnathus kuhlii Kaup, 1856; Syngnathus mossambicus Peters, 1855; Syngnathus wardi (Whitley, 1948)

= Hippichthys cyanospilos =

Species of fish

Hippichthys cyanospilos, commonly known as the blue spotted pipefish or bluespeckled pipefish, is a marine fish belonging to the family Syngnathidae, native from the Indo-Pacific area.

== Description ==
The blue-spotted pipefish is a small-sized fish that can reach a maximum length of 16 cm. Its head is in the continuity of the body. The snout is tapered and have a medium length. The body has a somewhat angular appearance due to the presence of four discontinuous longitudinal ridges distributed over the dorsal and ventral side. The caudal fin is small and narrow. The body coloration may range from yellow to light brown through almost black. The color can be plain, spotted or mottled with white, yellow or light blue. The dorsal fin is usually whitish with 3-4 small brownish spots on each of its 20-28 rays.

== Distribution & habitat ==
The blue-spotted pipefish is widespread throughout the tropical, subtropical and temperate waters of the Indo-Pacific from the eastern coast of Africa, Red Sea included, to Fidji and Philippines and from south Japan to north coast of Australia).

The blue-spotted pipefish likes the shallow waters of estuaries from small coastal rivers and mangrove area.

== Biology ==
The bluespeckled pipefish feeds on planktonic crustacean. It is ovoviviparous and it is the male who broods the eggs in its ventral brood pouch. The latter includes villi rich in capillaries that surround each fertilized egg creating a sort of placenta supplying the embryos. When fully grown, pups will be expelled from the pocket and evolve in complete autonomy.
