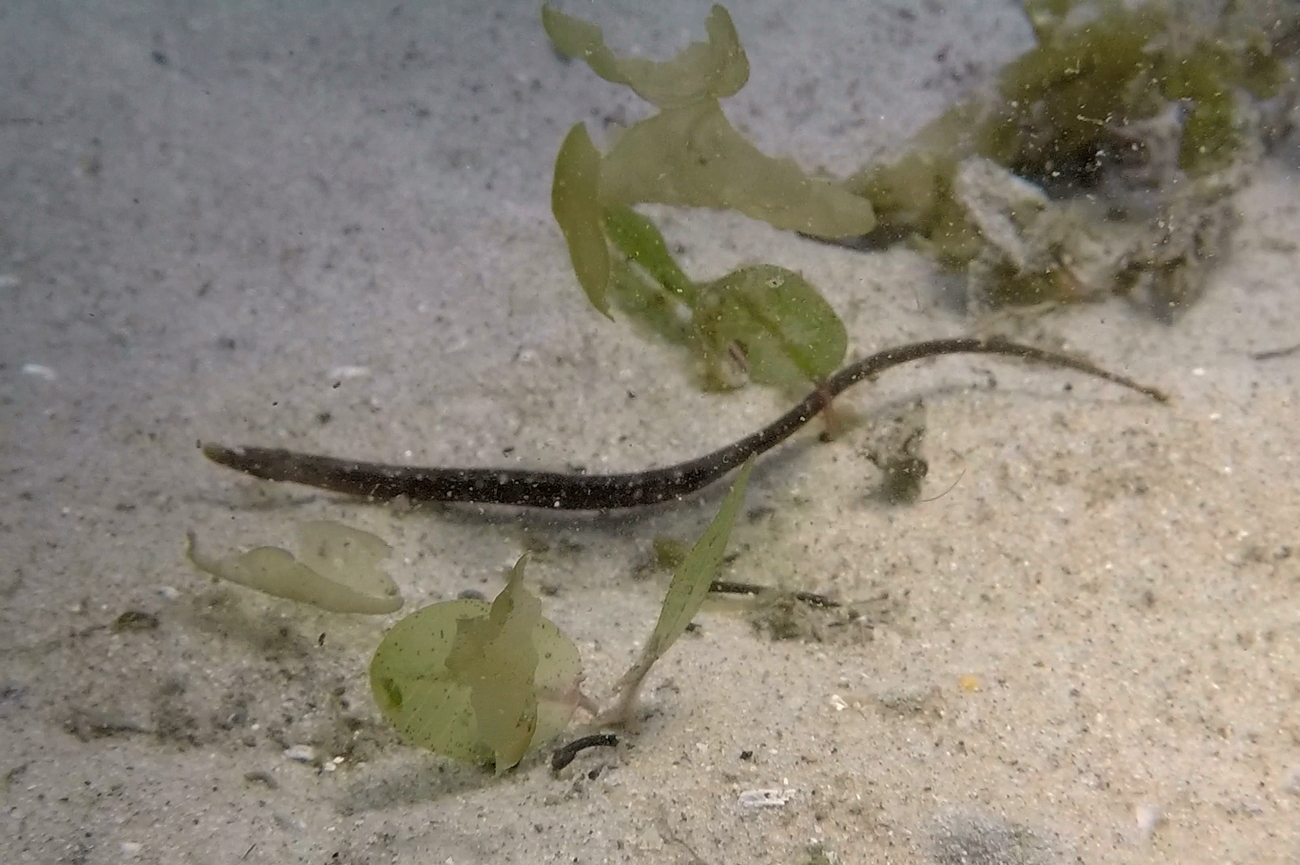

Conservation status
- Data Deficient (IUCN 3.1)

Scientific classification
- Kingdom: Animalia
- Phylum: Chordata
- Class: Actinopterygii
- Order: Syngnathiformes
- Family: Syngnathidae
- Genus: Campichthys
- Species: C. tryoni

Binomial name
- Campichthys tryoni (Ogilby, 1890)

Synonyms
- Ichthyocampus tryoni Ogilby, 1890

= Campichthys tryoni =

Tryon's pipefish

Species of fish

Campichthys tryoni (Tryon's pipefish) is a species of marine fish of the family Syngnathidae. Little is known of this species, but the specimens that have been collected were found on the Queensland coast off of northeastern Australia. It is a rare mainly tan coloured pipefish with brownish markings, it has a white blotch over the eyes, a pale patch above the operculum and it has small white dots along its back and tail. The males frequently show irregular dark barring along their ventral surface. This species is ovoviviparous, with males carrying eggs in a brood pouch until giving birth to live young. The largest known specimen is 7.2 centimetres (2.8 in) long, while males may brood at roughly 6–6 centimetres (2.4–2.4 in). The species was described by James Douglas Ogilby in 1890 from a specimen collected in Moreton Bay, Queensland in 1886 and the specific name honours his friend, Mr Henry Tryon, with whom he enjoyed a collecting trip in Moreton Bay. It is a listed Marine species in Australia under the Environment Protection and Biodiversity Conservation Act 1999.
