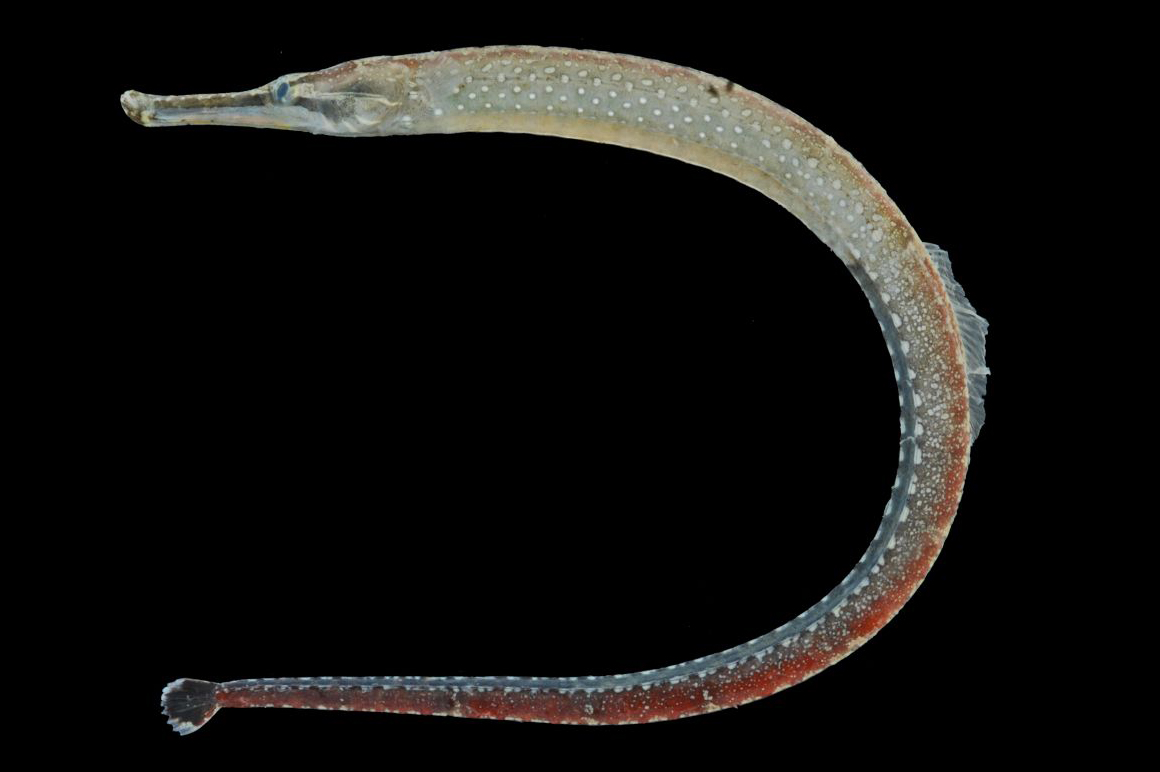

Conservation status
- Least Concern (IUCN 3.1)

Scientific classification
- Domain: Eukaryota
- Kingdom: Animalia
- Phylum: Chordata
- Class: Actinopterygii
- Order: Syngnathiformes
- Family: Syngnathidae
- Genus: Hippichthys
- Species: H. penicillus

Binomial name
- Hippichthys penicillus Cantor, 1849

Synonyms
- Corythroichthys quinquarius Snyder, 1911; Hippichthys gazella Whitley, 1947; Parasyngnathus penicillus Cantor, 1849; Syngnathus altirostris Ogilby, 1890; Syngnathus argyrostictus Kaup, 1856; Syngnathus biserialis Kaup, 1856; Syngnathus penicillus Cantor, 1849

= Hippichthys penicillus =

Beady pipefish

Species of fish

The beady pipefish (Hippichthys penicillus) is a species of pipefish of the family Syngnathidae. It is found in the Indo-West Pacific, from the western Persian Gulf, to the north central Indian Ocean, to Japan and Australia. It lives in the lower parts of streams and rivers, estuarine habitats such as seagrass beds and mangroves, and shallow inshore habitats, where it can grow to lengths of 16–18 centimetres (6.3–7.1 in). It is expected to feed on small crustaceans, similar to other pipefish. This species is ovoviviparous, with males carrying eggs in a brood pouch before giving birth to live young. Average brood size is 177.

== Identification ==
H. penicuillus is usually tan, greenish, or brown, with narrow pale bars across the back and dark edged white spots on the sides. The sides of tail rings usually have a pale blotch on or above the inferior ridge.
