= Hippichthys albomaculosus =

Conservation status
- Data Deficient (IUCN 3.1)

Scientific classification
- Domain: Eukaryota
- Kingdom: Animalia
- Phylum: Chordata
- Class: Actinopterygii
- Order: Syngnathiformes
- Family: Syngnathidae
- Genus: Hippichthys
- Species: H. albomaculosus

Binomial name
- Hippichthys albomaculosus Jenkins & Mailautoka, 2010

Species of fish

Hippichthys albomaculosus is a species of freshwater pipefish of the family Syngnathidae. It has been found in fresh and brackish waters on Vanua Levu Island, in Fiji, adjacent to mangroves. Little is known about the feeding habits of this species, but it is likely to feed on small crustaceans similar to other pipefish. This species is ovoviviparous, with males carrying eggs in a brood pouch before giving birth to live young.
