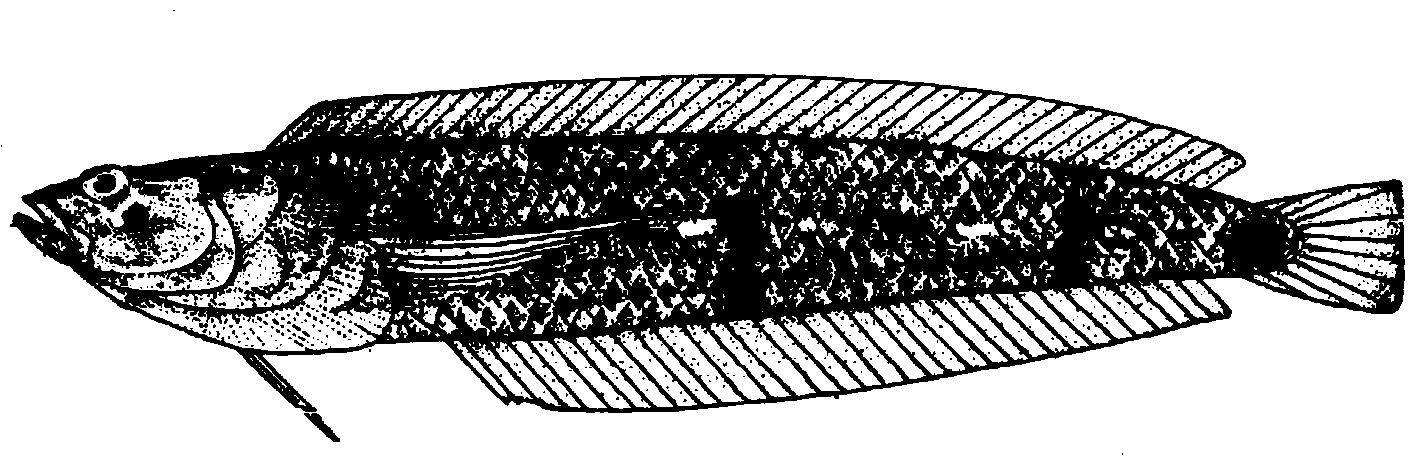

Conservation status
- Least Concern (IUCN 3.1)

Scientific classification
- Kingdom: Animalia
- Phylum: Chordata
- Class: Actinopterygii
- Division: Teleostei
- Order: Blenniiformes
- Family: Dactyloscopidae
- Genus: Heteristius; G. S. Myers & Wade, 1946
- Species: H. cinctus

Binomial name
- Heteristius cinctus (R. C. Osburn & Nichols, 1916)

Synonyms
- Dactyloscopus cinctus R. C. Osburn & Nichols, 1916

= Heteristius cinctus =

Species of fish

Heteristius cinctus, the banded stargazer, is a species of sand stargazer native to the Pacific coast of the Americas from Baja California, Mexico, to Ecuador where it can be found on sandy bottoms at depths of 1 to 27 m (3.3 to 88.6 ft). It can reach a maximum of 4.5 cm (1.8 in) in total length. This species is currently the only known member of its genus.
