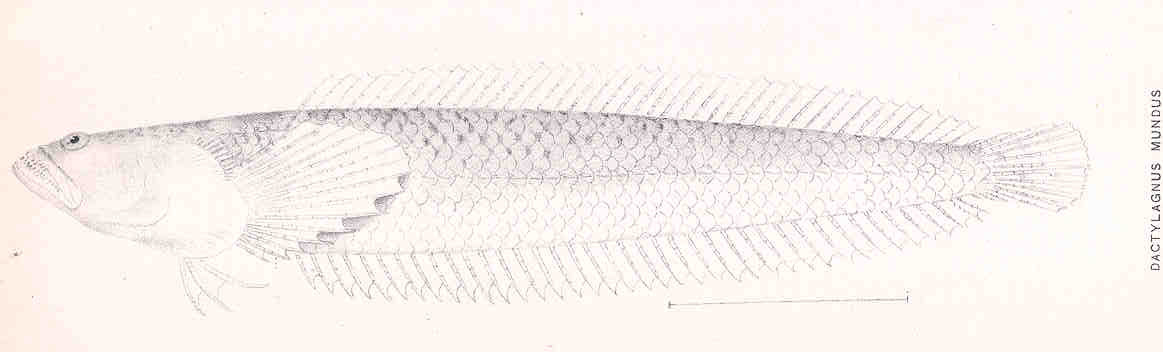

Conservation status
- Least Concern (IUCN 3.1)

Scientific classification
- Kingdom: Animalia
- Phylum: Chordata
- Class: Actinopterygii
- Order: Blenniiformes
- Family: Dactyloscopidae
- Genus: Dactylagnus
- Species: D. mundus

Binomial name
- Dactylagnus mundus T. N. Gill, 1863

= Dactylagnus mundus =

Species of fish

Dactylagnus mundus, the giant sand stargazer, is a species of sand stargazer found in the Gulf of California and along the Pacific coast of North America from Baja California to Panama as well as around the Galapagos Islands. It prefers sandy beaches down to a depth of about 5 metres (16 ft) and occasionally down to 15 metres (49 ft). It can reach a maximum length of 15 centimetres (5.9 in) SL. This species is of minor importance to local commercial fisheries.
