= Festucalex kulbickii =

Kulbicki's pipefish

Conservation status
- Data Deficient (IUCN 3.1)

Scientific classification
- Kingdom: Animalia
- Phylum: Chordata
- Class: Actinopterygii
- Order: Syngnathiformes
- Family: Syngnathidae
- Genus: Festucalex
- Species: F. kulbickii

Binomial name
- Festucalex kulbickii Fricke, 2004

Species of fish

Festucalex kulbickii, commonly known as Kulbicki's pipefish, or New Caledonian pipefish, is a species of marine fish of the family Syngnathidae. It is found from West Papua, Indonesia and Papua New Guinea to New Caledonia. It lives in coral reefs to depths of 56 metres (184 ft), where it can grow to lengths of 6.8 centimetres (2.7 in). It is expected to feed on small crustaceans, similar to other pipefish. This species is ovoviviparous, with males brooding eggs and giving birth to live young. The specific name honours Dr. Michel Kulbicki of L’Institut de recherche pour le développement (IRD) in Nouméa, New Caledonia.
