= Festucalex cinctus =

Girdled pipefish

Conservation status
- Least Concern (IUCN 3.1)

Scientific classification
- Domain: Eukaryota
- Kingdom: Animalia
- Phylum: Chordata
- Class: Actinopterygii
- Order: Syngnathiformes
- Family: Syngnathidae
- Genus: Festucalex
- Species: F. cinctus

Binomial name
- Festucalex cinctus Ramsay, 1882

Synonyms
- Syngnathus cinctus Ramsay, 1882

Species of fish

Festucalex cinctus (girdled pipefish or orange-cheek pipefish) is a species of marine fish of the pipefish family Syngnathidae which is endemic to the waters off eastern Australia.

== Identifying features ==
This species can be recognized by its broad head, slender snout, and leafy appendages on its dorsal ridges. Its colour varies from dark grey to orange-brown with pale bars along the back and an orange blotch on the lower gill cover, with occasional sightings of pale or black individuals. It can grow to lengths of 16 centimetres (6.3 in).

== Distribution and habitat ==
Festucalex cinctus is endemic to Australia, found off the coast of Queensland and New South Wales. It is a secretive species which lives in sheltered coastal bays and estuaries, on patches of coral rubble, sand or in areas where there is a sparse growth of seagrass, algae and sponges, at depths of 8–31 metres (26–102 ft). F. cinctus has been recorded in small numbers in the open water near to pilings of piers in harbours.

== Biology ==
Festucalex cinctus is demersal and is expected to feed on small crustaceans, similar to other pipefish. This species is ovoviviparous, with males carrying eggs and giving birth to live young. The males bear the fertilised eggs in a semi-enclosed pouch on the ventral side of the trunk, this pouch has distinct protective plates and its folds barely meet on the midline when it is full of eggs.

== Conservation ==
Festucalex cinctus is a species of marine animal listed under the Australian Environment Protection and Biodiversity Conservation Act 1999 and which is protected under the New South Wales Fisheries Management Act. Specimens from the tropical part of its distribution, in northern Queensland and the Northern Territory, appear to be different from specimens in New South Wales and may represent a different species.
