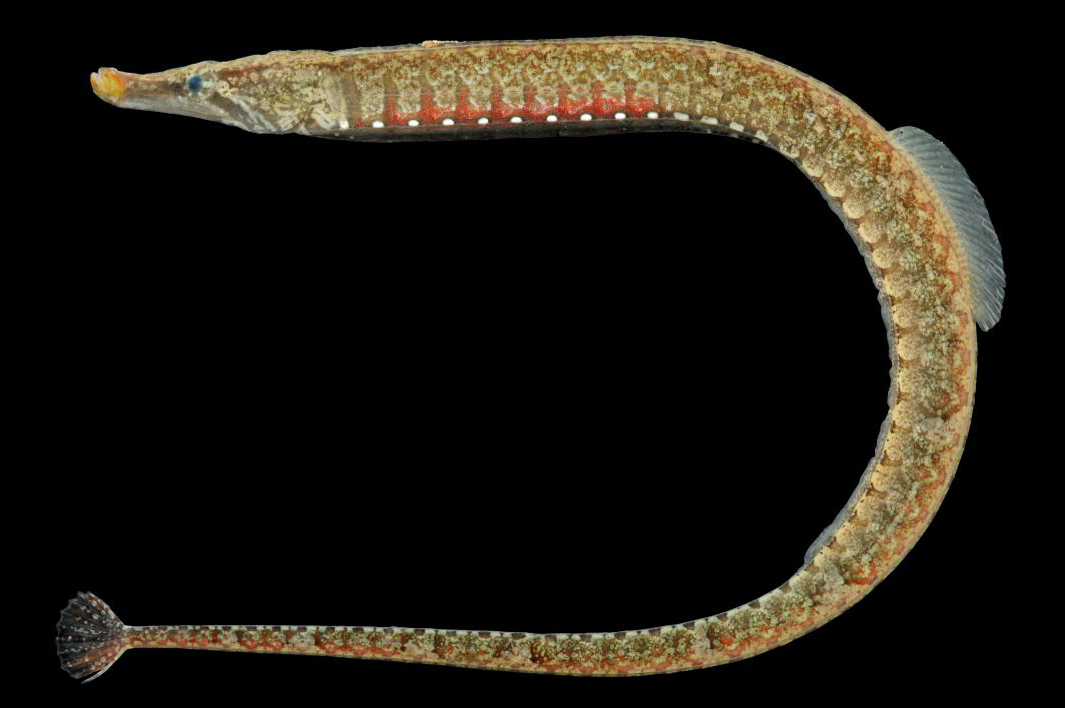

Conservation status
- Least Concern (IUCN 3.1)

Scientific classification
- Kingdom: Animalia
- Phylum: Chordata
- Class: Actinopterygii
- Order: Syngnathiformes
- Family: Syngnathidae
- Genus: Hippichthys
- Species: H. heptagonus

Binomial name
- Hippichthys heptagonus Bleeker, 1849

Synonyms
- Bombonia djarong Bleeker, 1853; Bombonia luzonica Herre, 1927; Bombonia uxorius Herre, 1935; Corythroichthys matterni Fowler, 1918; Corythroichthys pullus Smith & Seale, 1906; Hippichthys heptagoneus Bleeker, 1849; Hippichthys luzonica Herre, 1927; Oxleyana parviceps Ramsay & Ogilby, 1886; Syngnathus djarong Bleeker, 1853; Syngnathus djarong subsp. luzonica Herre, 1927; Syngnathus helfrichii Bleeker, 1855; Syngnathus matterni Fowler, 1918; Syngnathus parviceps Ramsay & Ogilby, 1886; Syngnathus spicifer subsp. djarong Bleeker, 1853; Syngnathus spicifer subsp. rivalis Peters, 1868

= Hippichthys heptagonus =

Belly pipefish

Species of fish

Hippichthys heptagonus, the belly pipefish, is a species of freshwater pipefish of the family Syngnathidae. It is found from Kenya and South Africa to the Solomon Islands, and from southern Japan to New South Wales. It is a demersal species, living in the lower parts of rivers and streams, estuary habitats such as mangroves and tidal creeks, and occasionally in large lakes. It feeds on small crustaceans, such as copepods and cladocerans, as well as dipteran and ephemopteran larvae. It can grow to lengths of 15 centimetres (5.9 in). This species is ovoviviparous, with females depositing eggs on the males, who in turn give birth to live young several weeks later. Males may brood at 6.5–7.5 centimetres (2.6–3.0 in).

== Identification ==
Hippichthys heptagonus can be recognized by its brownish colour, alternating dark and light bands along the back and sides, black stripe on the snout, and black bands radiating from the eye.
