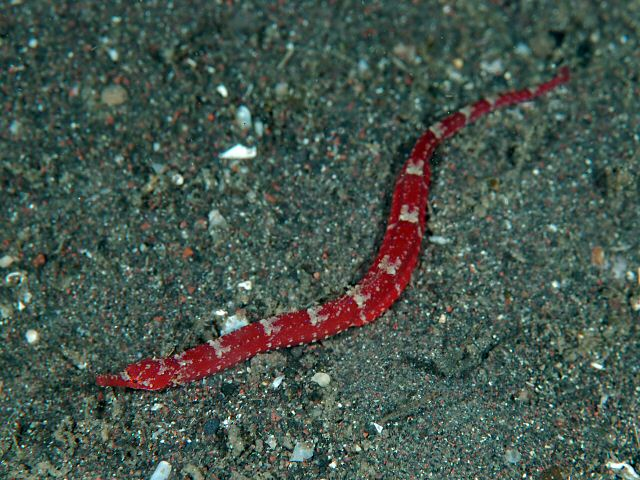

Conservation status
- Least Concern (IUCN 3.1)

Scientific classification
- Domain: Eukaryota
- Kingdom: Animalia
- Phylum: Chordata
- Class: Actinopterygii
- Order: Syngnathiformes
- Family: Syngnathidae
- Genus: Festucalex
- Species: F. erythraeus

Binomial name
- Festucalex erythraeus Gilbert, 1905

Synonyms
- Hippichthys amakusensis Tomiyama, 1972; Ichthyocampus erythraeus Gilbert, 1905; Ichthyocampus philippinus Fowler, 1938; Ichthyocampus townsendi Duncker, 1915

= Festucalex erythraeus =

Red pipefish

Species of fish

Festucalex erythraeus, known commonly as the red pipefish, is a species of marine pipefish of the family Syngnathidae. It is found throughout the Indo-Pacific, from Mozambique and South Africa to Hawaii, Honshu (Japan), and New Caledonia. It lives among rubble and coral or rocky reefs at depths of 18–40 metres (59–131 ft), where they can grow to lengths of 10 centimetres (3.9 in). They are expected to feed on small crustaceans, such as gammarid shrimps, mysids, and harpacticoid copepods. This species is ovoviviparous, with males brooding eggs and giving birth to live young. Males may brood at lengths of around 5.5 centimetres (2.2 in). It is exported from Hawaii as part of the aquarium trade.

Festucalex amakusensis and Festucalex townsendi which some authorities consider to be synonyms of F. erythraeus are considered by other authorities to be valid species.
