= James Erwin Böhlke =

American ichthyologist

James Erwin Böhlke (1930–1982) was an American ichthyologist. From 1954 to 1982, he was curator of the Department of Ichthyology at the Academy of Natural Sciences of Philadelphia (today the Academy of Natural Sciences of Drexel University).

He published over 120 papers on diverse groups of fishes and topics, primarily in his areas of expertise, fishes of the Bahamas, Caribbean, and South America.

His wife Eugenia (Genie) Brandt Böhlke (1928–2001) was also a noted ichthyologist. The serranid fish genus Jeboehlkia is named in his honour,

== Taxon described by him ==
- See Category:Taxa named by James Erwin Böhlke

== Taxon named in his honor ==
- The Sand Stargazer Dactyloscopus boehlkei C. E. Dawson, 1982
- Monognathus boehlkei is a deep-sea eel inhabiting all oceans at depths up to 2,000 metres (6,600 ft).
