= Charles Eric Dawson =

Canadian-American scientist (1922–1993)

- Dawson in 1991
- Born: December 6, 1922; Vancouver, British Columbia, Canada
- Died: February 11, 1993 (aged 70)
- Scientific career
- Fields: Ichthyology

Charles Eric "Chuck" Dawson Jr. (December 6, 1922 – February 11, 1993) was a Canadian-American ecologist, ichthyologist, and taxonomist. He held expertise in gobies, flatfishes, and sand stargazers, and was considered "the ultimate authority" on pipefishes in the family Syngnathidae.

== Life ==
Dawson was born in Vancouver, British Columbia, Canada and graduated from Miami Beach Senior High School in Florida. Dawson served in the Canadian Army during World War II, losing an eye in the Battle of Dieppe, France. He also joined the United States Army in September 1944 as a private, became a naturalized citizen in 1946. He attended University of Miami.

He spent much of his career at the University of Southern Mississippi's Gulf Coast Research Laboratory in Ocean Springs, Mississippi, where he worked early as an administrator, then researcher, and museum curator. Over his long career, Dawson wrote 150 publications, the majority of which he was the sole author of. He recognized 52 Syngnathid genera and provided systematic reviews of most of them. His work culminated with his extensive review of all Indo-Pacific pipefishes.

== Taxon described by him ==
- See Category:Taxa named by Charles Eric Dawson

== Death ==
He died as a result of a bronchioloalveolar carcinoma in combination with other long-term lung ailments.

== Taxon named in his honor ==
- Syngnathus dawsoni (Herald, 1969)
- the chain pearlfish, Echiodon dawsoni Williams and Shipp, 1982,
- the Brazilian goby Priolepis dawsoni Greenfield.
- The parasitic copepod Therodamas dawsoni Cressey, 1972,
- the marine barnacle Octolasmis dawsoni Causey, 1960
