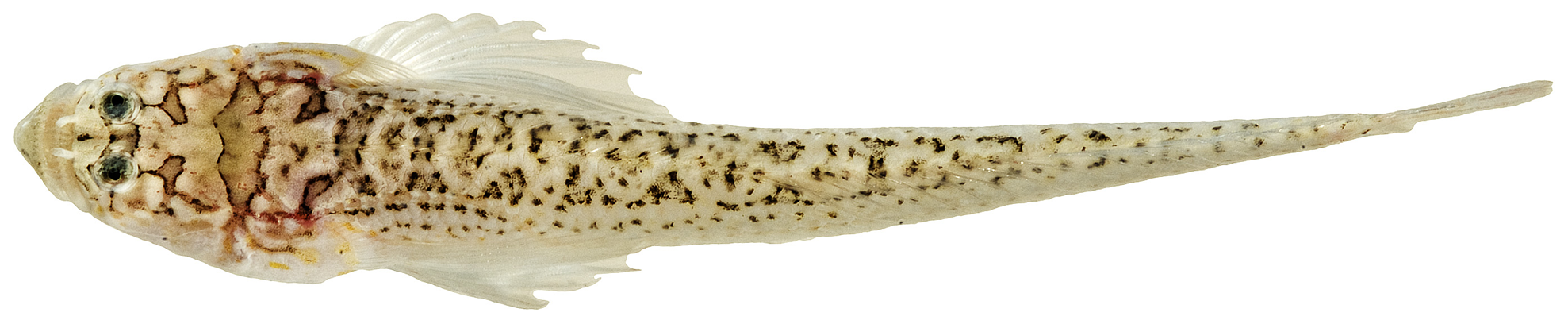
- Dactyloscopus tridigitatus

Scientific classification
- Kingdom: Animalia
- Phylum: Chordata
- Class: Actinopterygii
- Order: Blenniiformes
- Suborder: Blennioidei
- Family: Dactyloscopidae; T. N. Gill, 1859

Genera
- Dactylagnus Gill, 1863; Dactyloscopus Gill, 1859; Gillellus Gilbert, 1890; Heteristius Myers & Wade, 1946; Leurochilus Böhlke, 1968; Myxodagnus Gill, 1861; Platygillellus Dawson, 1974; Sindoscopus Dawson, 1974; Storrsia Dawson, 1982

= Sand stargazer =

Sand stargazers

Family of fishes

Sand stargazers are blennioids; perciform marine fish of the family Dactyloscopidae. Found in temperate to tropical waters of North and South America; some may also inhabit brackish environments. The giant sand stargazer (Dactylagnus mundus) is the largest at 15 cm in length; all other species are under 10 cm.

These blennies are named well: sand stargazers have protruding eyes on the top of their heads, fixed in an upward gaze, and may be on stalks. Their large mouths are also upturned. The dorsal fin is long and may or may not be continuous, with seven to 23 spines; the pelvic fins are situated below the throat and possess one spine. The anal fin is equally long and flowing. The mouth is fringed, and like the upper edge of the operculum (the gill cover), this fringe is divided into finger-like structures. The body is greatly elongated, and coloration is generally drab.

As their name would suggest, sand stargazers spend most of their time buried in sandy substrates waiting for unsuspecting prey; only the eyes, nose and mouth are usually visible. Their mode of respiration is also unique among the blennioids, using a branchiostegal rather than opercular pump; this is thought to be an adaptation to their largely sedentary, obscured lives. Sand stargazers generally stay within shallow (< 10 m) intertidal zones in areas protected from surges. Small invertebrates and fish make up the bulk of the sand stargazer's diet.

The family name Dactyloscopidae derives from the Greek words daktylos meaning "finger" (a reference to the divided mouth and operculum fringes) and skopein meaning "to watch".

== See also ==
- List of fish families
