= Spinach pipefish =

Conservation status
- Data Deficient (IUCN 3.1)

Scientific classification
- Kingdom: Animalia
- Phylum: Chordata
- Class: Actinopterygii
- Division: Teleostei
- Order: Syngnathiformes
- Family: Syngnathidae
- Genus: Microphis
- Species: M. spinachioides

Binomial name
- Microphis spinachioides (Duncker, 1915)

Synonyms
- Doryichthys spinachioides Duncker, 1915

Species of freshwater pipefish from Papua New Guinea

The spinach pipefish (Microphis spinachioides) is a species of freshwater pipefish in the family Syngnathidae. It is endemic to the Ramu–Sepik river system of Papua New Guinea. The species was described in 1915 and was last recorded by scientists in 1985, before being rediscovered in the Sepik River in 2026. It is classified as Data Deficient on the IUCN Red List.

== Etymology and taxonomy ==
The spinach pipefish was described by the German ichthyologist Georg Duncker in 1915. The type material came from the Sepik River, then known as the Kaiserin Augusta River. Duncker originally placed the species in the genus Doryichthys, as Doryichthys spinachioides. It is now classified in Microphis.

The name Microphis is derived from the Greek mikros, meaning "small", and ophis, meaning "serpent". The species name spinachioides means "resembling Spinachia", a genus of sticklebacks.

== Habitat ==
The spinach pipefish is known from the freshwater rivers of northern Papua New Guinea. Records are concentrated in the Sepik River system, including the main river and its tributaries, and the species has also been associated with the Ramu drainage.

It has been found in shallow areas along river margins, particularly where there is dense aquatic vegetation. Specimens collected during earlier surveys were found among vegetation in the Sepik River, while local people involved in the 2026 rediscovery also associated the fish with heavily vegetated river margins.

Very little is known about its movements or habitat requirements. It is regarded as a freshwater, potamodromous species, meaning that its movements, where they occur, take place within freshwater.

== Morphology ==
The spinach pipefish has the long, slender body typical of pipefishes. The body is covered by a series of bony rings, giving it a rigid and segmented appearance. It has a long, tubular snout and a narrow tail. It reaches at least 15 cm in length.

The dorsal fin has 57–63 soft rays and no spines. The body is generally greenish or brownish. Its coloration and slender shape make it inconspicuous among aquatic vegetation.

As in other pipefishes, the male carries the developing young. Fertilised eggs are held in a brood pouch beneath the tail. One recorded male was carrying about 150 embryos.

== Diet ==
Little is known about the diet of the spinach pipefish. Like other pipefishes, it has a tubular snout suited to suction feeding. Pipefishes living in freshwater vegetation commonly feed on small crustaceans and other small aquatic organisms.

== Contemporary rediscovery ==
The spinach pipefish was last recorded by scientists in 1985. It subsequently became one of the freshwater fishes regarded as "lost", having remained absent from the scientific record for more than four decades.

In 2026, researchers searching the Lower Sepik River worked with local communities to look for the species. Local knowledge proved useful in identifying areas where the fish was still encountered. On 18 June, fisherwoman Helen Asu caught two pipefish in a hand net while fishing for freshwater prawns. The fish were subsequently identified as M. spinachioides, confirming that the species was still present in the Sepik River system.

The rediscovery was significant because the species had not been scientifically recorded since 1985 and its historical type specimen is apparently no longer extant. The living specimens therefore provide an opportunity to study a fish about which comparatively little is known.

Biologist Jashandeep Shostak described the rediscovery as particularly important because it confirms that the species has not disappeared and makes renewed study of its biology possible. He noted that the availability of living specimens is especially valuable given the apparent loss of the historical type material.
