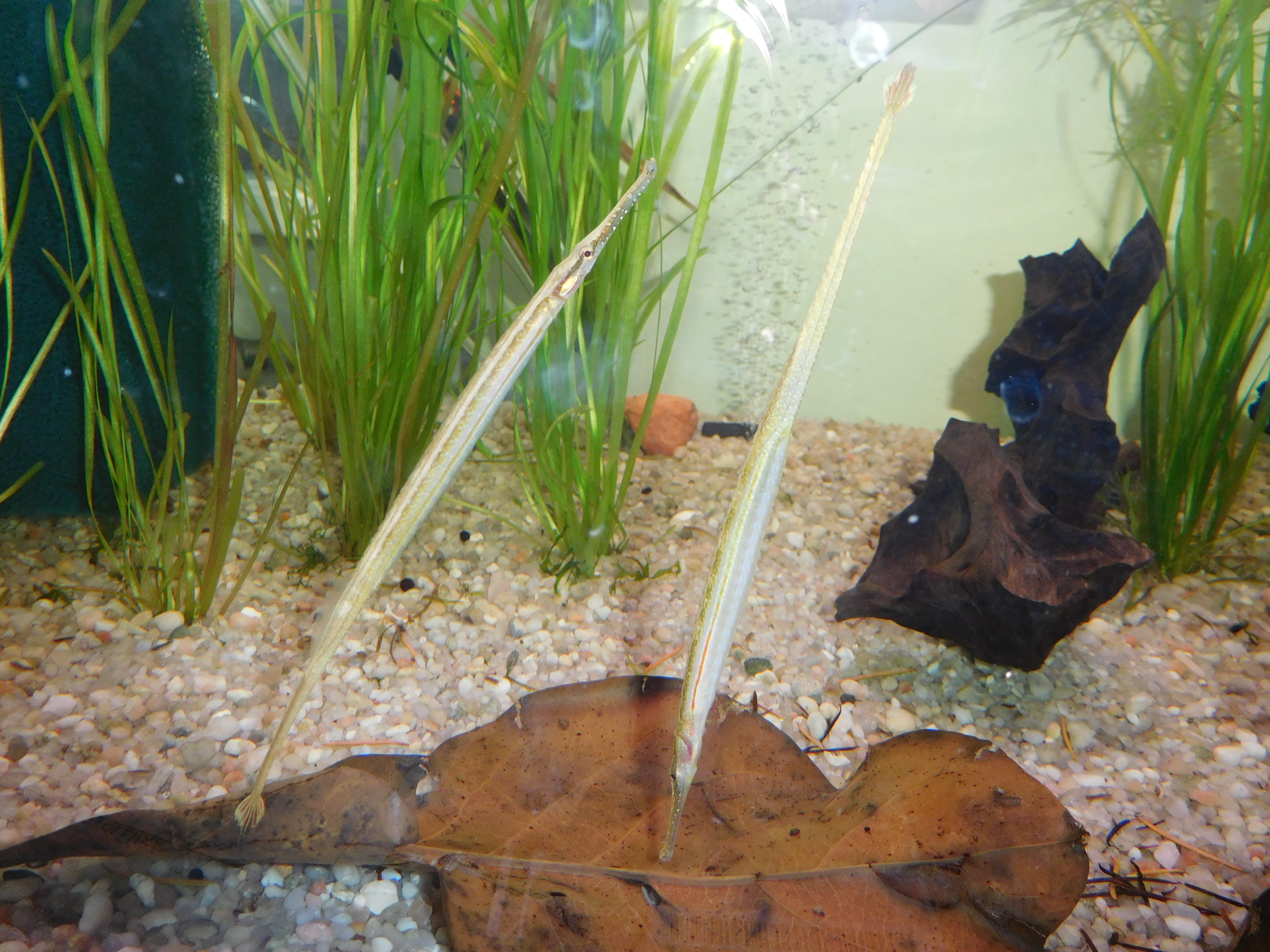
- Short-tailed pipefish (Microphis brachyurus)

Scientific classification
- Kingdom: Animalia
- Phylum: Chordata
- Class: Actinopterygii
- Order: Syngnathiformes
- Family: Syngnathidae
- Subfamily: Nerophinae
- Genus: Microphis; Kaup, 1853

Type species
- Syngnathus deocata (Hamilton 1822)

Synonyms
- Doryichthys Duncker, 1910; Oostethus Hubbs, 1929; Paramicrophis Klausewitz, 1955

= Microphis =

Genus of fishes

Microphis is a genus of pipefishes (stream pipefishes or river pipefishes) within the family Syngnathidae. Members of this genus are notable among the Syngnathidae for residing in mainly fresh and brackish waters. Adults breed in coastal rivers, streams, or lakes, and fertilized eggs are carried by the male pipefish in a brood pouch extending along his entire ventral surface.

== Species ==
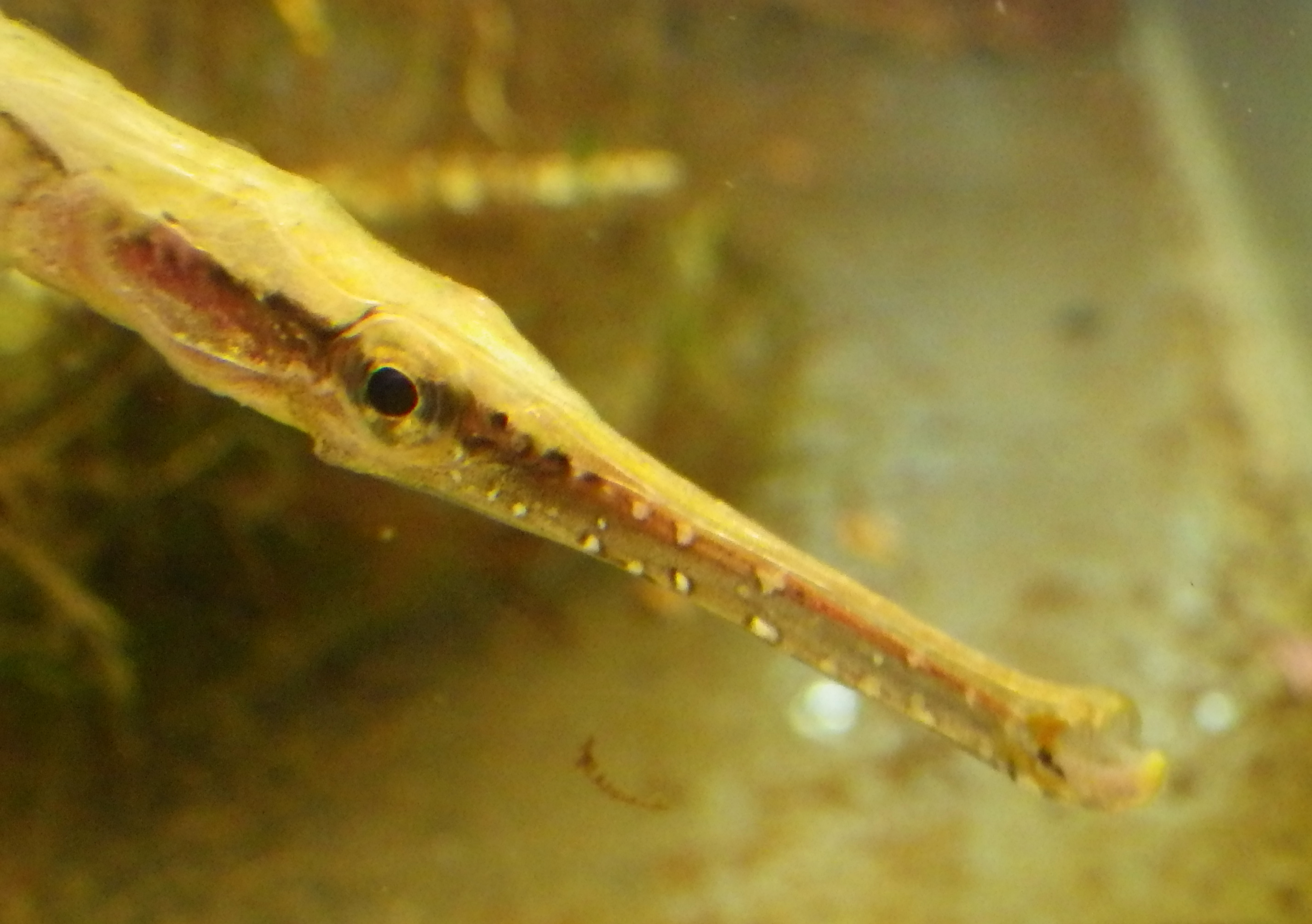
Closeup of the head and mouth of Microphis brachyurus

The currently recognized species in this genus are:

- Microphis aculeatus (Kaup, 1856)
- Microphis argulus (W. K. H. Peters, 1855) (flat-nosed pipefish)
- Microphis brachyurus (Bleeker, 1854) (short-tailed pipefish)
- Microphis brevidorsalis (de Beaufort, 1913) (stream pipefish)
- Microphis caudocarinatus (M. C. W. Weber, 1907) (slender pipefish, Tawarin river pipefish)
- Microphis cruentus C. E. Dawson & Fourmanoir, 1981 (Dumbéa River pipefish)
- Microphis cuncalus (F. Hamilton, 1822) (crocodile-tooth pipefish)
- Microphis deocata (F. Hamilton, 1822) (green, rainbow belly, or deocata pipefish)
- Microphis dunckeri (Prashad & Mukerji, 1929)
- Microphis fluviatilis (W. K. H. Peters, 1852) (freshwater pipefish)
- Microphis insularis (Hora, 1925) (Andaman pipefish)
- Microphis jagorii W. K. H. Peters, 1868
- Microphis leiaspis (Bleeker, 1854) (barhead pipefish)
- Microphis lineatus (Kaup, 1856) (opossum pipefish)
- Microphis manadensis (Bleeker, 1856) (Manado pipefish)
- Microphis mento (Bleeker, 1856) (red pipefish)
- Microphis millepunctatus (Kaup, 1856) (thousand-spot pipefish)
- Microphis ocellatus (Duncker, 1910) (ocellated pipefish)
- Microphis pleurostictus W. K. H. Peters, 1868
- Microphis retzii (Bleeker, 1856) (ragged-tail pipefish)
- Microphis spinachioides (Duncker, 1915) (spinach pipefish)
