= Mozambique Channel =

Indian Ocean strait

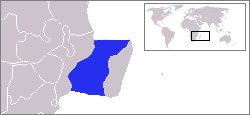
- Location of Mozambique Channel

- Location within Africa
- Coordinates: 18°S 41°E
- Type: Arm
- Part of: Indian Ocean
- Basin countries: Madagascar and Mozambique
- Max. length: 1,600 km (990 mi)
- Max. width: 1,000 km (620 mi)
- Min. width: 419 km (260 mi)
- Surface area: 700,000 km^{2} (270,000 sq mi)
- Max. depth: 3,292 m (10,801 ft)

The Mozambique Channel (French: Canal du Mozambique, Malagasy: Lakandranon'i Mozambika, Portuguese: Canal de Moçambique) is an arm of the Indian Ocean located between the Southeast African countries of Madagascar and Mozambique. The channel is about 1,700 km (900 nmi; 1,100 mi) long and 419 km (226 nmi; 260 mi) across at its narrowest point, and reaches a depth of 3,292 m (10,801 ft) about 230 km (124 nmi; 143 mi) off the coast of Mozambique. A warm current, the Mozambique Current, flows in a southward direction in the channel, leading into the Agulhas Current off the east coast of Southern Africa.

== Extent ==
The International Hydrographic Organization (IHO) defines the limits of the Mozambique Channel as follows:

On the North. A line from the estuary of the River Rovuma (10°28′S 40°26′E) to Ras Habu, the northernmost point of Ile Grande Comore, the northernmost of the Comore (Comoro) Islands, to Cap d'Ambre (Cape Amber), the northern extremity of Madagascar (11°57′S 49°17′E).

On the East. The west coast of Madagascar.

On the South. A line from Cap Sainte-Marie, the southern extremity of Madagascar to Ponto do Ouro on the mainland (26°53′S 32°56′E).

On the West. The coast of Southern Africa.

== Islands in the channel ==
=== Comoros ===
- Grande Comore
- Mohéli
- Anjouan

=== France ===
- Region of France: Mayotte (claimed by Comoros)
- Scattered Islands in the Indian Ocean, district of French Southern and Antarctic Lands:
  - Glorioso Islands (claimed by Madagascar and Comoros)
  - Juan de Nova Island (claimed by Madagascar)
  - Europa Island (claimed by Madagascar)
  - Bassas da India (claimed by Madagascar)

=== Mozambique ===
- Primeiras and Segundas Archipelago
- Ilha do Fogo
- Quirimbas Islands

The St. Lazarus Banks are a seamount located about 50 to 75 nautical miles off the Quirimbas Archipelago in the channel. Rising from approximately 2,000 m to the shallowest depth of 12 m., they are famous for marine biodiversity and are a major location for deep-sea fishing.

== History ==
On 15 November 1939, under the command of Captain Patrick (Paddy) Dove, the British Coastal Tanker Africa Shell was sailing through the Mozambique Channel en-passage from Quelimane to Lourenço Marques. During the morning, at a point 10 nautical miles (19 km; 12 mi) south-southwest from the lighthouse at Cape Zavora, she was spotted by the German Pocket Battleship Admiral Graf Spee, under the command of Captain Hans Langsdorff, and which was embarked upon a raiding sortie. Graf Spee ordered the Africa Shell to stop by the firing of a shot across her bow. Having stopped the Africa Shell, a cutter with a boarding party was despatched from Graf Spee and boarded the tanker, the officer in charge addressing Captain Dove in perfect English with the sentence, "Good morning, captain. Sorry; fortunes of war". The boarding party ordered the ship's crew into their lifeboats before stripping the Africa Shell of all foodstuffs including a small amount of wine. The crew were ordered to row for shore, except for Captain Dove who was taken prisoner on board the Graf Spee. Dove was incensed by the interception of his ship, and complained personally to Langsdorff, citing that the Africa Shell was within Portuguese territorial waters and that the action was in clear violation of international law. The boarding party set scuttling charges and made their way back to the Graf Spee. The detonation of the charges sank the Africa Shell.

In 1942, the Mozambique Channel was a World War II clashpoint during the Battle of Madagascar.

France is present through Mayotte and the Scattered Islands, and maintains a military presence via Réunion, with naval assets patrolling fairly regularly. These islets provide exclusive economic zones (EEZs), rich in fisheries resources and potentially hydrocarbons. For France, the real challenge is to preserve its sovereignty over Mayotte, vis-à-vis the Comoros, and especially over the Scattered Islands, in the face of Malagasy threats. The Malagasy are legally contesting the French presence, believing that these islets were dependencies of Madagascar and that once independence was achieved, they should have reverted to Madagascar, not to France.

The 1800 kilometre long channel carries some 30% of the world's tanker traffic. A recent Islamist insurrection in northern Mozambique has increasingly led to disruption in the Mozambique Channel; the South African Navy has conducted intermittent anti-piracy patrols in the Channel since 2011.
