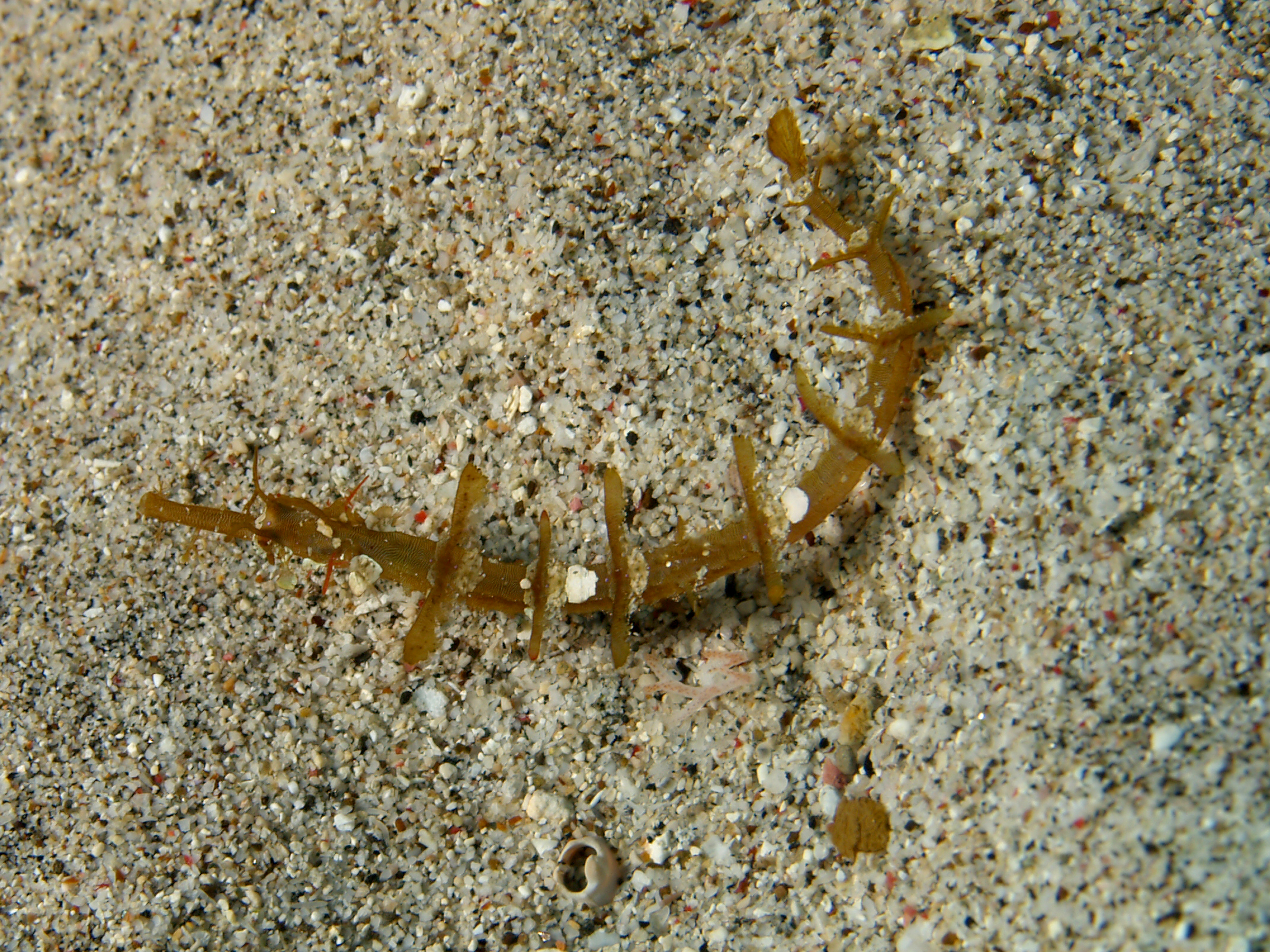

Conservation status
- Least Concern (IUCN 3.1)

Scientific classification
- Kingdom: Animalia
- Phylum: Chordata
- Class: Actinopterygii
- Order: Syngnathiformes
- Family: Syngnathidae
- Genus: Halicampus
- Species: H. macrorhynchus

Binomial name
- Halicampus macrorhynchus Bamber, 1915

Synonyms
- Phanerotokeus gohari Duncker, 1940

= Halicampus macrorhynchus =

Species of fish

Halicampus macrorhynchus or also commonly known as the ornate pipefish , whiskered pipefish or winged pipefish is a species of fish in the family Syngnathidae.

== Description ==
The ornate pipefish is a small sized fish that can reach a maximum length of 18 cm. It has a thin and elongate body with reduced fins which are difficult to observe. Its body color varies with its environment to match it and improve its camouflage. It ranges from reddish to brownish through greenish and yellowish. The backside of its body has some small skin growths, forming pairs of fins like, generally eight in number and has also small irregular whitish, pinkish spots. The head is small and does not really stand out from the rest of the body, it has a long snout which extremity can be covered with skin growths.

== Distribution ==
The ornate pipefish is widespread throughout the tropical and subtropical waters of the Indo-West Pacific from the eastern coast of Africa, Red Sea included, until Salomon Islands and from South Japan to the Queensland's area in Australia.

The ornate pipefish is found close to the bottom between the surface and 25 meters deep.

It prefers areas such as reef, sandy bottom or coral rubble with algae or debris in which it can easily hide.

== Biology ==
Like many of their congeners belonging to the family of Pipefishes, the ornate pipefish has a benthic lifestyle and is ovoviviparous.

Its reproduction occurs during a courtship where the female will transfer her eggs in the ventral surface of the male between skin folds forming a kind of protective pouch in which he will fertilize them and protect them during the incubation period.

The ornate pipefish is a carnivore. Its diet is based on small crustaceans and other invertebrates which it aspires through its tubular snout.
