= Patrick Dove =

Patrick Dove may refer to:

- Patrick Edward Dove (1815–1873), Scottish born author of the book The Theory of Human Progression, and Natural Probability of a Reign of Justice
- Patrick Dove (sea captain) (1896–1957), British merchant navy officer, author of the book I Was Graf Spee's Prisoner
