= Microphis ocellatus =

Ocellated pipefish

Conservation status
- Data Deficient (IUCN 3.1)

Scientific classification
- Kingdom: Animalia
- Phylum: Chordata
- Class: Actinopterygii
- Order: Syngnathiformes
- Family: Syngnathidae
- Genus: Microphis
- Species: M. ocellatus

Binomial name
- Microphis ocellatus (Duncker, 1910)

Synonyms
- Doryichthys ocellatus Duncker, 1910

Species of ray-finned fish

Microphis ocellatus, the ocellated pipefish, is a species of ray-finned fish in the family Syngnathidae. It is found only in Indonesia and Sri Lanka. The species measured 12.5 centimetres (4.9 in) SL in length.
