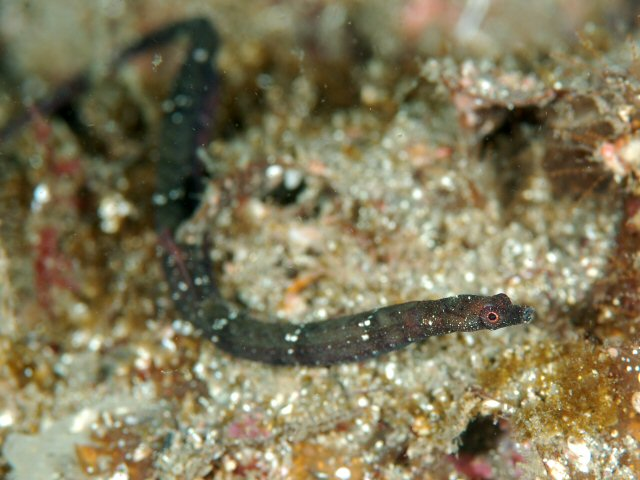
- Booth's Pipefish (H. boothae)

Scientific classification
- Kingdom: Animalia
- Phylum: Chordata
- Class: Actinopterygii
- Order: Syngnathiformes
- Family: Syngnathidae
- Tribe: Hippocampini
- Genus: Halicampus; Kaup, 1856

Type species
- Halicampus grayi Kaup, 1856

Synonyms
- Halicampoides Fowler, 1956; Phanerotokeus Duncker, 1940

= Halicampus =

Genus of fishes

Halicampus is a genus of pipefishes of the family Syngnathidae, containing 12 described species.

== Etymology ==
The name Halicampus is derived from Greek. The first part of the name, hali, is a word for sea or salt when used in combination with other words, deriving from ἅλς, háls. In this case, hali- has been combined with campus, which is from the Greek word campe, meaning a bend, turn, or curve.

== Taxonomy ==
Despite their close resemblance to other pipefish, a 2022 phylogenetic study found Halicampus to be the closest relative to the seahorses of the genus Hippocampus, and placed both genera in the tribe Hippocampini.

=== Species ===
There are currently 12 recognized species in this genus:

- Halicampus boothae (Whitley, 1964) (Booth's pipefish)
- Halicampus brocki (Herald, 1953) (Brock's pipefish)
- Halicampus dunckeri (Chabanaud, 1929) (Duncker's pipefish)
- Halicampus edmondsoni (Pietschmann, 1928) (Edmondson's pipefish)
- Halicampus grayi Kaup, 1856 (Gray's pipefish)
- Halicampus macrorhynchus Bamber, 1915 (Ornate pipefish)
- Halicampus marquesensis C. E. Dawson, 1984
- Halicampus mataafae (D. S. Jordan & Seale, 1906) (Samoan pipefish)
- Halicampus nitidus (Günther, 1873) (Glittering pipefish)
- Halicampus punctatus (Kamohara, 1952) (Starry pipefish)
- Halicampus spinirostris (C. E. Dawson & G. R. Allen, 1981) (Spinysnout pipefish)
- Halicampus zavorensis C. E. Dawson, 1984 (Zavora pipefish)

== Distribution ==
Halicampus species are mainly found in shallow tropical or subtropical waters of the Pacific, Indian and South-east Atlantic Oceans. When fully grown they vary from 50 to 200 mm in length. They are generally secretive and often well camouflaged so although quite rarely seen; some species may be quite common. Halicampus zavorensis, for example, is known only from three specimens from the North-west Indian Ocean but it is not known if this reflects rarity or is the result of behaviour (e.g. swimming into clumps of weed when threatened), mimesis (e.g. shape resembling some algae) or crypsis (e.g. mottled and banded brown colour blending into the background). Adults are usually found in less than 100m of water, but juveniles are pelagic and may be found deeper than this.

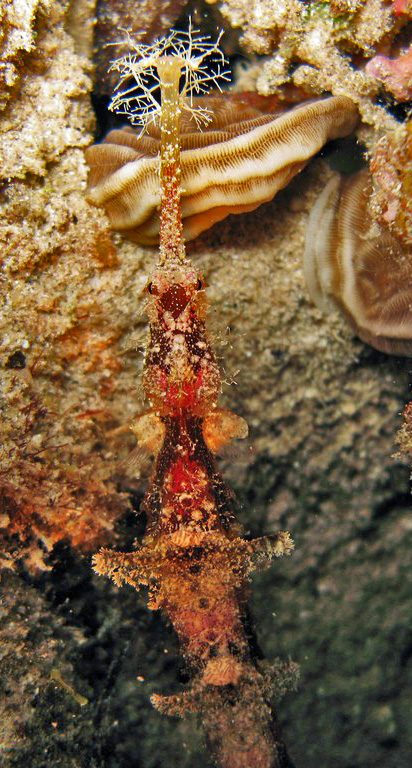
The ornate pipefish, Halicampus macrorhynchus, showing the whiskery projections from the snout

== Biology ==
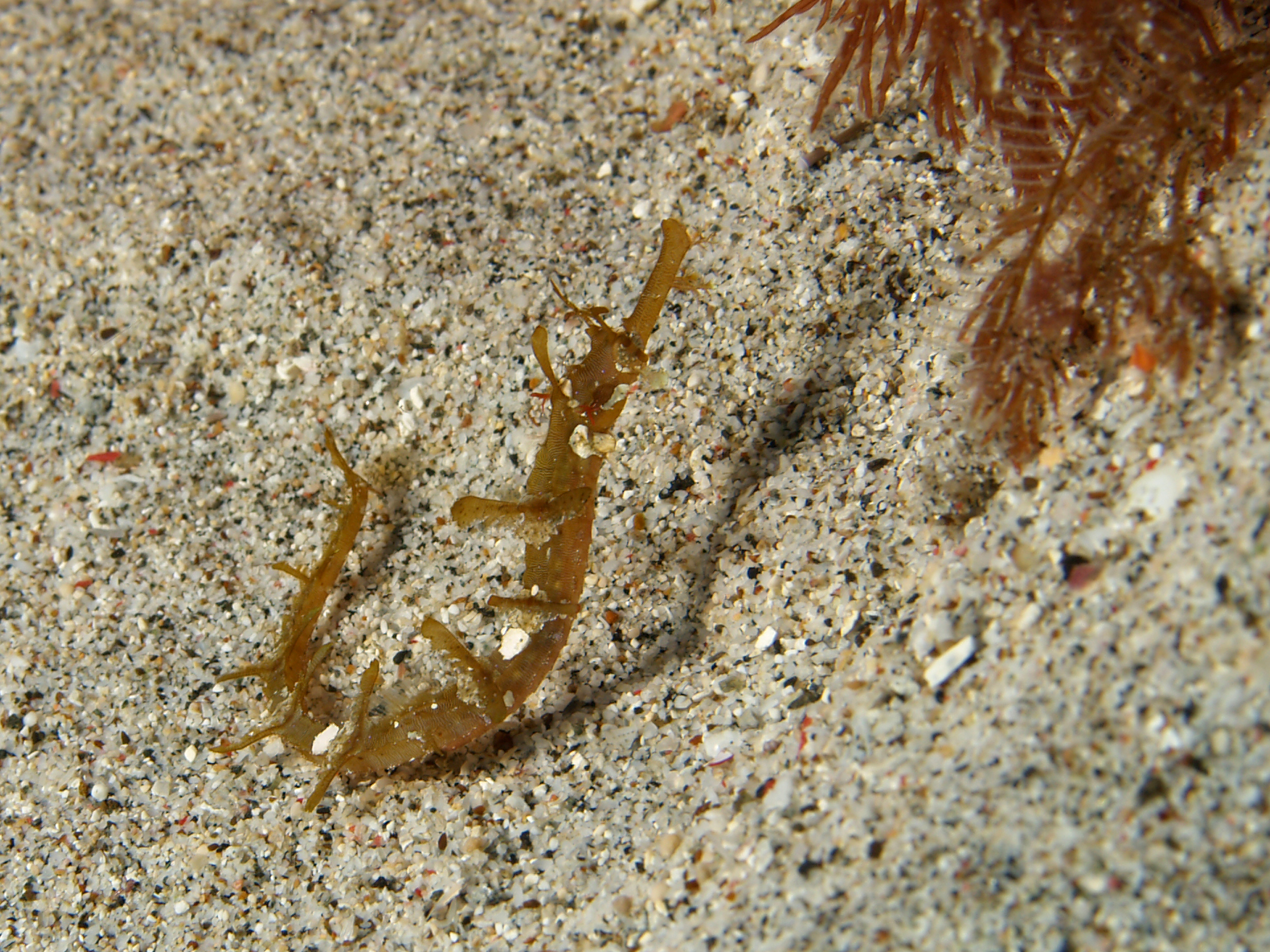
The ornate pipefish, Halicampus macrorhynchus, showing the overall appearance including the projections from the sides of the body

Adults mainly live in sheltered areas such as coral reefs, seagrass beds or among macroalgae. Some species are most often found on or in coral rubble and sand or mud. Along with other members of the family Syngnathidae, they have protective bony or osseous armor plates covering their body surface. This limits their flexibility so that they tend to swim rather sluggishly, mainly using rapid fin movements. They also have characteristically fused jaws. For those species where the feeding habits are known, the diet consists of small planktonic crustacea which are snapped up by the small mouth at the tip of the snout, as they float past in the current. With a slim snout, relatively large eyes and raised rear part of the skull, the head is very reminiscent of that of a seahorse, in contrast to the long, slim body. There are often projections sticking out from the body and head at intervals along the length of the fish.

== Reproduction ==
Halicampus species are ovoviviparous so they give birth to live young. Like seahorses (Hippocampus spp.) and other members of the Syngnathidae, the eggs are transferred at mating into a brood pouch on the ventral surface of the male. The brood pouch extends from just behind the anus to about halfway along the tail. It is formed by elongated folds of the skin surface which are less well protected by bony plates than the rest of the body. The eggs are incubated within individual skin cells in the brood pouch, hatch, and are released as their yolk sac is exhausted. In those species about which much is known, these new-born fish become free-swimming pelagic members of the plankton until they are about half-grown, when they settle into their preferred adult habitat.
