= Microphis lineatus =

Opossum pipefish

Conservation status
- Data Deficient (IUCN 3.1)

Scientific classification
- Kingdom: Animalia
- Phylum: Chordata
- Class: Actinopterygii
- Order: Syngnathiformes
- Family: Syngnathidae
- Genus: Microphis
- Species: M. lineatus

Binomial name
- Microphis lineatus (Kaup, 1856)

Synonyms
- Microphis brachyurus lineatus

Species of fish

Microphis lineatus, the opossum pipefish, is a species of fish in the family Syngnathidae. It is found in fresh, brackish and marine waters in the West Atlantic region, ranging from New Jersey, United States, to São Paulo, Brazil, including the Caribbean and Gulf of Mexico. It is often found in rivers, among water hyacinth roots, in mangrove and in Sargassum.

The opossum pipefish was formerly regarded as a subspecies of Microphis brachyurus (native to Asia and Oceania), but is now recognized as a full species by both FishBase and Catalog of Fishes. Furthermore, it is possible that full-freshwater populations currently included in the opossum pipefish represent a separate species.

In the United States, the opossum pipefish is considered a species of concern by the National Marine Fisheries Service. Due to uncertainty about its taxonomy and vulnerability to habitat destruction, it is considered data deficient by the IUCN. It reaches up to 19.4 cm (7.6 in) in standard length.

== Species description ==
Opossum pipefish are a widespread species that spawn in low salinity areas of estuaries. The color of the opossum pipefish is distinctive, especially in breeding adults: the upper snout and back half of the head and body is sienna brown with a series of dark red blotches on each lateral trunk ring forming a red stripe between the lateral and superior trunk ridges; there is a silver stripe on the mid-side between the lateral and inferior trunk ridges, a silver edge on the inferior trunk ridge; the lower half of the snout is bright red with a variable number of black vertical bars, and the caudal fin is also red with a central dark stripe.

== Ecology ==
Nothing is known about annual variation in population size, but the decline in habitat quality (described below) has likely led to a drastic decrease in population size.

== Conservation ==
The major threats to the opossum pipefish are habitat destruction, water control structures, declining water quality, and an increase in disease. These factors have been documented within the primary ecosystems occupied by opossum pipefish.

== Conservation designations ==
IUCN: Data deficient.

U.S. National Marine Fisheries Service: Species of Concern

American Fisheries Society: Threatened

Species of Greatest Conservation Need:FL, LA, and TX.
