= Halicampus nitidus =

Glittering pipefish

Conservation status
- Least Concern (IUCN 3.1)

Scientific classification
- Kingdom: Animalia
- Phylum: Chordata
- Class: Actinopterygii
- Order: Syngnathiformes
- Family: Syngnathidae
- Genus: Halicampus
- Species: H. nitidus

Binomial name
- Halicampus nitidus (Günther, 1873)

Synonyms
- Doryichthys elegans Steindachner, 1901; Syngnathus nitidus Günther, 1873

Species of fish

The glittering pipefish (Halicampus nitidus) is a species of marine coastal fish of the family Syngnathidae. It is found in the Western Pacific, from Viet Nam to Fiji and from the Ryukyu Islands to New Caledonia, where it inhabits corals, sand and reef flats to depths of 20 metres (66 ft). It can grow to lengths of 7.3 centimetres (2.9 in), and is expected to feed on small crustaceans, similar to other pipefishes. It is secretive and rarely observed. This species is ovoviviparous, with males carrying eggs and giving birth to live young.

== Identification ==
H. nitidus can be recognized by its distinctive zebra-like pattern of dark brown and silvery-white bands that run the length of its body and head.
