= Halicampus spinirostris =

Spinysnout pipefish

Conservation status
- Least Concern (IUCN 3.1)

Scientific classification
- Domain: Eukaryota
- Kingdom: Animalia
- Phylum: Chordata
- Class: Actinopterygii
- Order: Syngnathiformes
- Family: Syngnathidae
- Genus: Halicampus
- Species: H. spinirostris

Binomial name
- Halicampus spinirostris C. E. Dawson & G. R. Allen, 1981

Synonyms
- Micrognathus spinirostris Dawson & Allen, 1981

Species of fish

The spinysnout pipefish (Halicampus spinirostris) is a species of marine pipefish of the family Syngnathidae. It is found in the Indo-Pacific, from Sri Lanka to Samoa, and from Japan and the Marshall Islands to central Australia. It lives in rocky and coral reefs, rubble, lagoons and intertidal zones, often at depths of 2–12 metres (6.6–39.4 ft), where it can grow to lengths of 12 centimetres (4.7 in). It is expected to feed on small crustaceans, similar to other pipefish. This species is ovoviviparous, with males carrying eggs in a brood pouch before giving birth to live young.

== Identification ==
H. spinirostris is pale to dark brown coloured, with four alternating thick dark and thin white bars. It can be recognized by its distinctive spines on the snout.
