= Microphis insularis =

Conservation status
- Vulnerable (IUCN 3.1)

Scientific classification
- Kingdom: Animalia
- Phylum: Chordata
- Class: Actinopterygii
- Order: Syngnathiformes
- Family: Syngnathidae
- Genus: Microphis
- Species: M. insularis

Binomial name
- Microphis insularis (Hora, 1925)

Species of fish

Microphis insularis, also known as the Andaman pipefish, is a species of freshwater pipefish belonging to the family Sygnathidae. This species is found only in rivers and streams located in the Andaman Islands, India. They can reach 16 cm (6.3 in) in length and reproduce through ovoviviparity, in which males carry eggs and give live birth. The Andaman pipefish is considered threatened likely due to the effects of habitat degradation, invasive species, and the alteration of flow of its freshwater habitats.
