= Microphis deocata =

Conservation status
- Near Threatened (IUCN 3.1)

Scientific classification
- Kingdom: Animalia
- Phylum: Chordata
- Class: Actinopterygii
- Order: Syngnathiformes
- Family: Syngnathidae
- Genus: Microphis
- Species: M. deocata

Binomial name
- Microphis deocata Hamilton 1822

Species of fish

Microphis deocata, also known as the rainbow belly pipefish or deocata pipefish, is a species of fish belonging to the family Syngnathidae. This freshwater species can be found in the Ganges and Brahmaputra rivers in India and Bangladesh. Its diet likely consists of insect larvae and small crustaceans. Reproduction occurs through ovoviviparity in which males brood eggs before giving live birth. Microphis deocata is currently considered a near threatened species likely due to the effect of hydrological alterations on their freshwater habitat as well as overfishing, pollution, sedimentation, and invasive species.
