= Ragged-tail pipefish =

Conservation status
- Least Concern (IUCN 3.1)

Scientific classification
- Kingdom: Animalia
- Phylum: Chordata
- Class: Actinopterygii
- Order: Syngnathiformes
- Family: Syngnathidae
- Genus: Microphis
- Species: M. retzii

Binomial name
- Microphis retzii (Bleeker, 1856)

Synonyms
- Doryichthys retzii (Bleeker, 1856); Doryichthys retzii subsp. albadorsum Fowler, 1944; Lophocampus retzii (Bleeker, 1856); Microphis caudatus Peters, 1869; Microphis torrentius Jordan & Seale, 1906; Syngnathus retzii Bleeker, 1856

Species of ray-finned fish

Microphis retzii, the ragged-tail pipefish, is a species of freshwater pipefish in the family Syngnathidae. The species is distributed across Southeast Asia and parts of the western Pacific and inhabits tropical freshwater river systems. The species was first described from Manado in Sulawesi, Indonesia, and later reassigned to the genus Microphis under the subgenus Lophocampus following taxonomic revision of Indo-Pacific freshwater pipefishes.

== Description ==
Microphis retzii is a slender pipefish distinguished by an elongated, armored body with an angular cross section composed of bony rings. The species exhibits 15 to 17 trunk rings, most commonly 16, and 27 to 31 tail rings. Dorsal-fin rays number between 32 and 42, while pectoral-fin rays range from 16 to 20, typically 17 to 18. The head length is approximately 7.1 to 10.7 times in standard length (SL), and the snout is elongated, measuring roughly 2.2 to 2.6 times the head length.

Coloration varies from pale to dark brown, with many individuals displaying a dark lateral stripe on the head and diffuse darker bars or stripes along the trunk. Juveniles may have elongated caudal-fin rays, whereas adults generally possess a rounded caudal fin. This species reaches approximately 140 to 145 mm (5.5 to 5.7 in) SL, with males potentially becoming reproductively active at around 66 mm (2.6 in) SL.

== Distribution and habitat ==
Microphis retzii occurs in freshwater habitats across Indonesia, the Philippines, Papua New Guinea, and islands extending southeastward to Pohnpei (Federated States of Micronesia) and Samoa. It is also native to Fiji, the Solomon Islands (South Solomons), and Tonga, and further high up in eastern China, Taiwan and Japan. Within Indonesia, it has been recorded from the Lesser Sunda Islands, Maluku, Papua, and Sulawesi, while in Papua New Guinea it occurs in the Bismarck Archipelago, the North Solomons, and the main island group. Meanwhile, the known distribution of M. retzii in Japan includes the Yaeyama Islands (Iriomote and Ishigaki), with sporadic records also reported from Wakayama and Shizuoka prefectures on the main islands of Honshu. Recent study shows that there is an apparent recent increase in records of M. retzii along the path of the Kuroshio Current, suggesting a possible northward expansion of its range. The Yaeyama Islands are considered the northern limit of the species' breeding range, and these populations may serve as a source for further dispersal to the north via the Kuroshio Current.

Microphis retzii was long considered a single widespread species across Southeast Asia and parts of the North Pacific. Recent genetic analyses, however, have revealed that what was once thought to be a single species actually consists of three distinct lineages with separate geographic distributions. These lineages are genetically quite different from one another and do not share genetic markers, indicating that they have been isolated for a long period of time, likely around 1.8 million years. The three lineages are generally associated with specific regions:

1. East Indonesia: Found in Sulawesi, the Maluku Islands (Ambon and Ceram), and Papua. This group corresponds to the original M. retzii.
2. West Indonesia: Found on the Sunda Shelf islands, including Bali, Java, and Lombok. This group appears to be a distinct but closely related form.
3. North Pacific: Found in China and Taiwan, representing another separate lineage.

The separation of these lineages may have been influenced by historical changes in sea levels, ocean currents, and the species' ability to move between freshwater and marine environments during early life stages. These findings suggest that M. retzii is actually a species complex, with several evolutionarily distinct groups rather than a single species. A formal taxonomic revision is needed to clarify the classification of these lineages.

Microphis retzii is primarily found in streams and rivers at elevations up to approximately 150 metres above sea level. The species typically inhabits flowing, well-oxygenated waters associated with shaded riparian vegetation and rocky or pebble substrates. Pipefishes living in freshwater environments, including this species, tend to prey on zooplankton such as mosquito larvae and small crustaceans.

== Reproduction ==
Like other members of the family Syngnathidae, M. retzii exhibits male parental care. Fertilized eggs are carried in a brood pouch located on the ventral trunk of the male.

During reproduction, females transfer eggs directly into the male brood pouch during courtship. Eggs are arranged in rows along the pouch, where embryos develop until the male releases fully formed juveniles. Broods typically contain approximately 100 eggs. Evidence suggests that early life stages may include planktonic dispersal, indicating possible amphidromous movement between freshwater and marine or estuarine environments.
