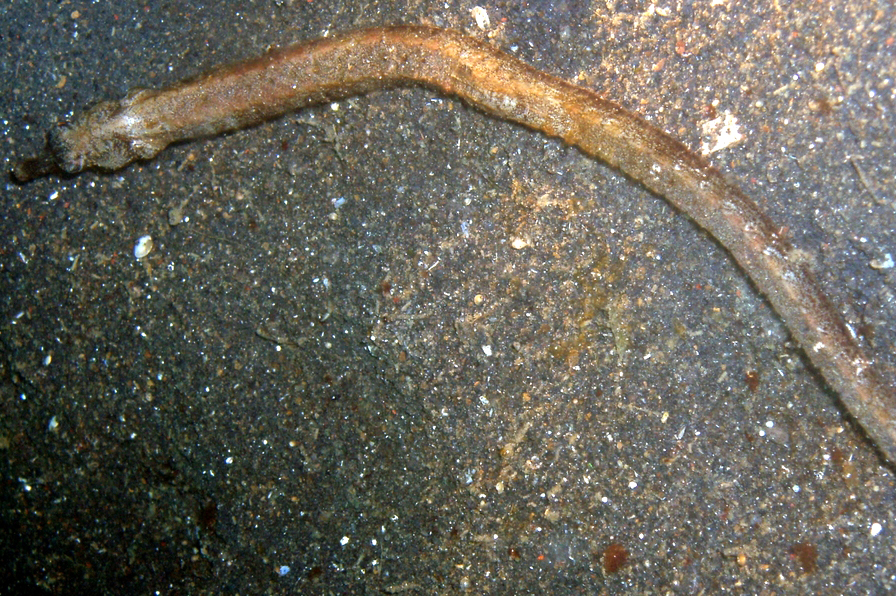

Conservation status
- Least Concern (IUCN 3.1)

Scientific classification
- Kingdom: Animalia
- Phylum: Chordata
- Class: Actinopterygii
- Order: Syngnathiformes
- Family: Syngnathidae
- Genus: Halicampus
- Species: H. mataafae

Binomial name
- Halicampus mataafae Jordan & Seale, 1906

Synonyms
- Corythoichthys mataafae Jordan & Seale, 1906

= Halicampus mataafae =

Samoan pipefish

Species of fish

The Samoan pipefish, or brown pipefish (Halicampus mataafae), is a species of marine fish of the family Syngnathidae. It is found in the Indo-Pacific, from the Red Sea, to Sodwana Bay, to Taiwan, the Marshall Islands, and Samoa, where it inhabits tidepools and coral and rocky reefs to depths of 15 metres (49 ft). It is a solitary species with cryptic habits and is rarely observed. It is likely to feed on small crustaceans, and can grow to lengths of 14 centimetres (5.5 in). This species is ovoviviparous, with males carrying the fertilised eggs in a brood pouch, the folds of which fall well short of the centre of the egg-filled pouch, eventually giving birth to live young.

== Etymology ==
The specific name honours Mataafa, a former king of Samoa. It is a listed marine species under the Australian Environment Protection and Biodiversity Conservation Act 1999.

== Identification ==
H. mataafae can be identified by its reddish-brown colouring and small pale spots on its trunk and tail.

== Further ==
- Encyclopedia of Life
- iSeahorse
- IUCN Seahorse, Pipefish & Stickleback Specialist Group
