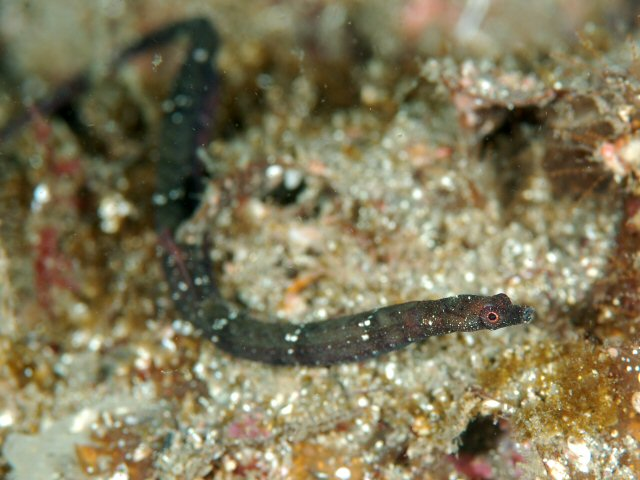

Conservation status
- Least Concern (IUCN 3.1)

Scientific classification
- Domain: Eukaryota
- Kingdom: Animalia
- Phylum: Chordata
- Class: Actinopterygii
- Order: Syngnathiformes
- Family: Syngnathidae
- Genus: Halicampus
- Species: H. boothae

Binomial name
- Halicampus boothae Whitley, 1964

Synonyms
- Micrognathus boothae Whitley, 1964

= Halicampus boothae =

Booth's pipefish

Species of fish

Booth's pipefish (Halicampus boothae) is a species of marine fish of the family Syngnathidae. It is found in the Western Indian Ocean, in South Africa and the Comoro Islands, and in the Western Pacific, from South Korea and Japan to the Great Barrier Reef and Tonga. It lives in rocks and coral reefs to depths of 30 metres (98 ft), where it can grow to lengths of 17.5 centimetres (6.9 in). This species is ovoviviparous, with males carrying eggs and giving birth to live young.

== Etymology ==
The specific name honours for Julie Booth, who "presented many interesting fishes to the Australian Museum from New South Wales and Lord Howe Island".

== Identification ==
Colour varies from light to dark brown, with evenly spaced pale bars along the pipefish's back and upper side. Usually has a pale snout tip.
