= Halicampus edmondsoni =

Edmondson's pipefish

Conservation status
- Least Concern (IUCN 3.1)

Scientific classification
- Domain: Eukaryota
- Kingdom: Animalia
- Phylum: Chordata
- Class: Actinopterygii
- Order: Syngnathiformes
- Family: Syngnathidae
- Genus: Halicampus
- Species: H. edmondsoni

Binomial name
- Halicampus edmondsoni (Pietschmann, 1913)

Synonyms
- Ichthyocampus edmondsoni Pietschmann, 1928

Species of fish

Edmondson's pipefish (Halicampus edmondsoni) is a species of marine fish of the family Syngnathidae. It is endemic to coastal waters of the Hawaiian Islands, from Oahu to Maui, where it inhabits shallow reefs, beaches and tidepools to depths of 33 metres (108 ft). Although this species' feeding habits are unknown, it is expected to feed on small crustaceans similar to other pipefishes. This species is ovoviviparous, with males carrying eggs in a brood pouch before giving birth to live young. Males may brood at 9.4 centimetres (3.7 in).

== Etymology ==
The fish is named in honor of biologist Charles Howard Edmondson of the Bishop Museum in Honolulu, who helped Pietschmann with his work and also collected the type specimen.
