= Dumbéa River pipefish =

Conservation status
- Data Deficient (IUCN 3.1)

Scientific classification
- Kingdom: Animalia
- Phylum: Chordata
- Class: Actinopterygii
- Order: Syngnathiformes
- Family: Syngnathidae
- Genus: Microphis
- Species: M. cruentus

Binomial name
- Microphis cruentus C. E. Dawson & Fourmanoir, 1981

Species of fish

The Dumbéa River pipefish (Microphis cruentus) is a species of fish in the family Syngnathidae. It is endemic to the lower reaches of the Dumbéa River in New Caledonia, where it is found in depths of up to 8 m (26 ft) above sea level. As this species is almost entirely unknown, there are no specific conservation measures in place for the pipefish.
