= Halicampus zavorensis =

Zavora pipefish

Conservation status
- Data Deficient (IUCN 3.1)

Scientific classification
- Domain: Eukaryota
- Kingdom: Animalia
- Phylum: Chordata
- Class: Actinopterygii
- Order: Syngnathiformes
- Family: Syngnathidae
- Genus: Halicampus
- Species: H. zavorensis

Binomial name
- Halicampus zavorensis C. E. Dawson, 1984

Species of fish

The Zavora pipefish (Halicampus zavorensis) is a species of marine fish of the family Syngnathidae. It is only known from three specimens found in the Western Indian Ocean, one from Zavora, Mozambique and two from Sur, Oman. Little is known about its habitat or feeding habits, but they are expected to feed on small crustaceans similar to other pipefish. It can grow to at least 10 centimetres (3.9 in) in length. This species is ovoviviparous, with males carrying eggs and giving birth to live young.
