= Slender pipefish =

Conservation status
- Data Deficient (IUCN 3.1)

Scientific classification
- Kingdom: Animalia
- Phylum: Chordata
- Class: Actinopterygii
- Order: Syngnathiformes
- Family: Syngnathidae
- Genus: Microphis
- Species: M. caudocarinatus

Binomial name
- Microphis caudocarinatus (M. C. W. Weber, 1907)

Synonyms
- Doryichthys caudocarinatus Weber, 1907

Species of fish

The slender pipefish (Microphis caudocarinatus) is a species of fish in the family Syngnathidae. It is endemic to West Papua in Indonesia.
