= Halicampus grayi =

Gray's pipefish

Conservation status
- Least Concern (IUCN 3.1)

Scientific classification
- Kingdom: Animalia
- Phylum: Chordata
- Class: Actinopterygii
- Order: Syngnathiformes
- Family: Syngnathidae
- Genus: Halicampus
- Species: H. grayi

Binomial name
- Halicampus grayi Kaup, 1856

Synonyms
- Halicampus conspicillatus Kaup, 1856; Syngnathus koilomatodon Bleeker, 1858; Halicampus koilomatodon (Bleeker, 1858); Syngnathus trachypoma Günther, 1884; Trachyrhamphus caba Seale, 1910

Species of fish

Halicampus grayi, Gray's pipefish, also known as the mud pipefish or spiny pipefish, is a species of marine fish of the family Syngnathidae. It is found in the Indo-Pacific in the Gulf of Aden, Sri Lanka, and from the Gulf of Thailand to Japan, the Marshall Islands, and the Great Barrier Reef. It lives to depth of 100 metres (330 ft), and planktonic juveniles have been found above depths of 3,000 metres (1.9 mi). It occurs in muddy habitats, in estuaries, and on coral reefs, where it likely feeds on small crustaceans. It can grow to lengths of 20 centimetres (7.9 in). This species is ovoviviparous, with males carrying eggs in a brood pouch before giving birth to live young.

== Etymology ==
The fish's patronym was not identified but it was certainly in honor of British zoologist John Edward Gray (1800-1875), who got Kaup's monograph on syngnathid fishes published under the auspices of the British Museum.

== Description ==
H. grayi is brownish with dark bars along the side of its body, and pale bars on the gill membrane. This colouring provides extremely good camouflage for muddy and silty habitats, where the species will cover itself to stay hidden.
