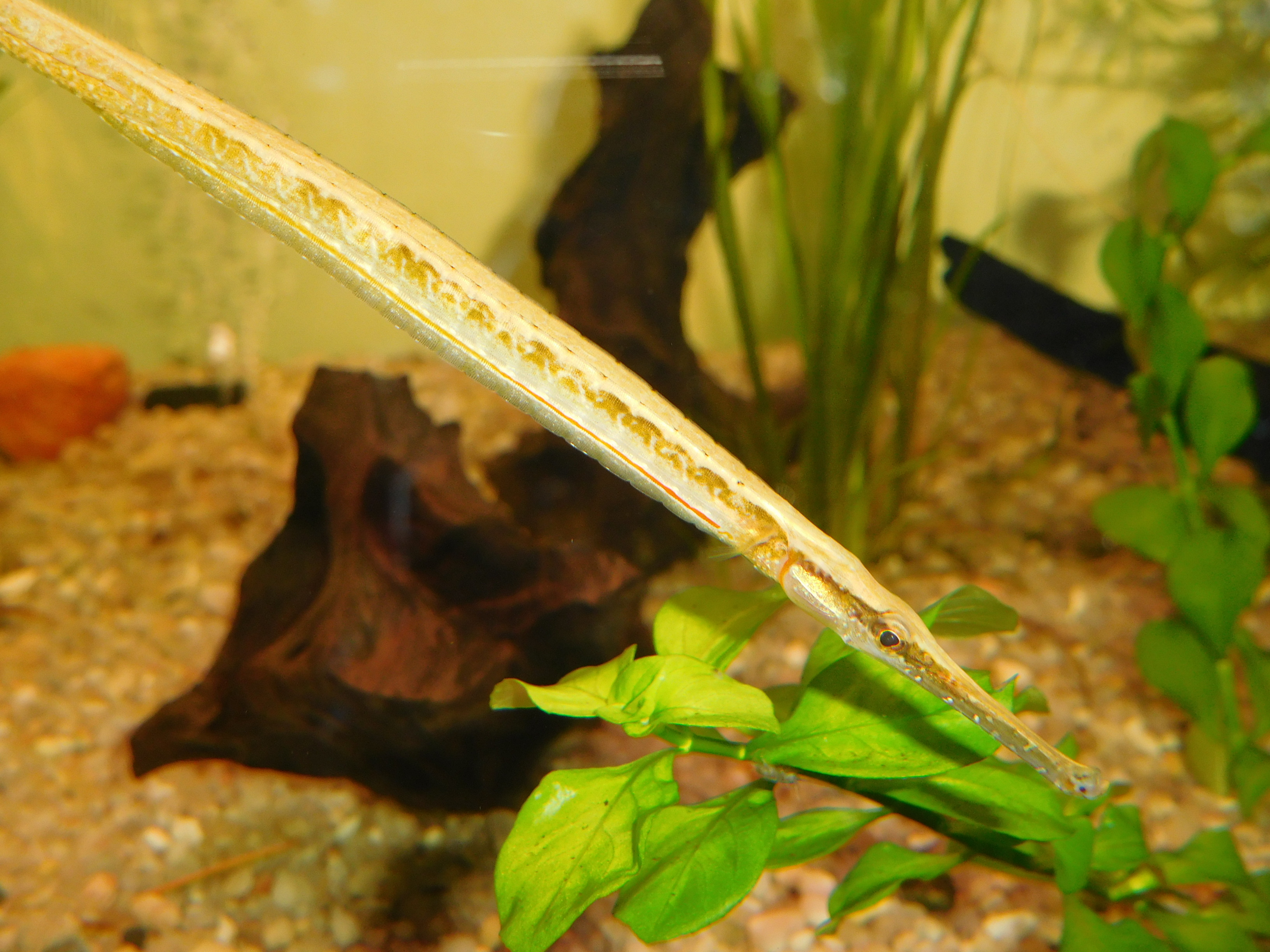

Conservation status
- Least Concern (IUCN 3.1)

Scientific classification
- Kingdom: Animalia
- Phylum: Chordata
- Class: Actinopterygii
- Order: Syngnathiformes
- Family: Syngnathidae
- Genus: Microphis
- Species: M. brachyurus

Binomial name
- Microphis brachyurus (Valenciennes, 1842)

Synonyms
- Syngnathus brachyurus Bleeker, 1854; Doryichthys brachyurus (Bleeker, 1854); Oostethus brachyurus (Bleeker, 1854); Syngnathus polyacanthus Bleeker, 1856; Doryichthys hasselti Kaup, 1856; Doryichthys auronitens Kaup, 1856; Doryichthys pristipeltis Kaup, 1856; Microphis bleekeri Day, 1865; Microphis jouani Duméril, 1870; Doryichthys philippinus Fowler, 1918

= Short-tailed pipefish =

Species of fish

The short-tailed pipefish (Microphis brachyurus) is a species of fish in the family Syngnathidae. It is found in fresh and brackish waters from Sri Lanka and India east to southern Japan and the Society Islands. It inhabits places with little or no current in rivers, streams and estuaries.

It formerly included three subspecies, but these are now regarded as separate species: Microphis aculeatus of the East Atlantic region, Microphis lineatus of the West Atlantic and Caribbean regions, and Microphis millepunctatus of the Western Indian Ocean region.

The short-tailed pipefish reaches up to 22 cm (8.7 in) in standard length.
