= Halicampus marquesensis =

Conservation status
- Least Concern (IUCN 3.1)

Scientific classification
- Kingdom: Animalia
- Phylum: Chordata
- Class: Actinopterygii
- Order: Syngnathiformes
- Family: Syngnathidae
- Genus: Halicampus
- Species: H. marquesensis

Binomial name
- Halicampus marquesensis C. E. Dawson, 1984

Species of fish

Halicampus marquesensis is a species of fish of the family Syngnathidae. It is found primarily off of the coast of the Marquesas Islands, in French Polynesia, although other unconfirmed specimens have been reported in Fiji and Papua New Guinea. In inhabits sandy and rubble habitats from depths of 21–35 metres (69–115 ft), where it can grow to lengths of 7 centimetres (2.8 in). It likely feeds on small crustaceans, similar to other pipefish. This species is ovoviviparous, with males carrying eggs in a brood pouch before giving birth to live young.
