= MS Africa Shell =

History
- Name: Africa Shell
- Owner: Shell Company of East Africa Ltd. - Anglo-Saxon Petroleum Co. Ltd., London
- Operator: 1939–1939: Shell Company of East Africa Ltd.
- Port of registry: (United Kingdom) London
- Route: East Africa
- Builder: George Brown & Co (Marine) Ltd, Greenock
- Yard number: 207
- Laid down: 1938
- Launched: 10 November 1938
- Completed: February 1939
- In service: 1939
- Out of service: 1939
- Identification: Official Number 167164; Code Letters M M Y T
- Fate: Sunk 24°31′S 35°12′E

General characteristics
- Type: Coastal oil tanker
- Tonnage: 706 gross register tons (GRT)
- Length: 184.8 ft (56.3 m)
- Beam: 29.6 ft (9.0 m)
- Depth: 11.5 ft (3.5 m)
- Installed power: 162 NHP
- Propulsion: Werkspoor oil engine; driving twin screws
- Crew: 28

MS Africa Shell, was a British coastal oil tanker operated by the Shell Company of East Africa Ltd. The ship's life was short, lasting only a matter of months from her introduction into service in 1939, until she was intercepted and sunk by the German cruiser Admiral Graf Spee in the Mozambique Channel, off the coast of Portuguese East Africa, becoming the sixth victim of Admiral Graf Spee's commerce raiding sortie.

== History ==
=== Pre-war service ===
Africa Shell was designed and built in the Greenock yards of George Brown & Co (Marine) Ltd. Her engine came from the Dutch engineering company Werkspoor N.V., Amsterdam. Following her construction Africa Shell entered into service in the late Spring of 1939.

=== Second World War ===
==== Background ====
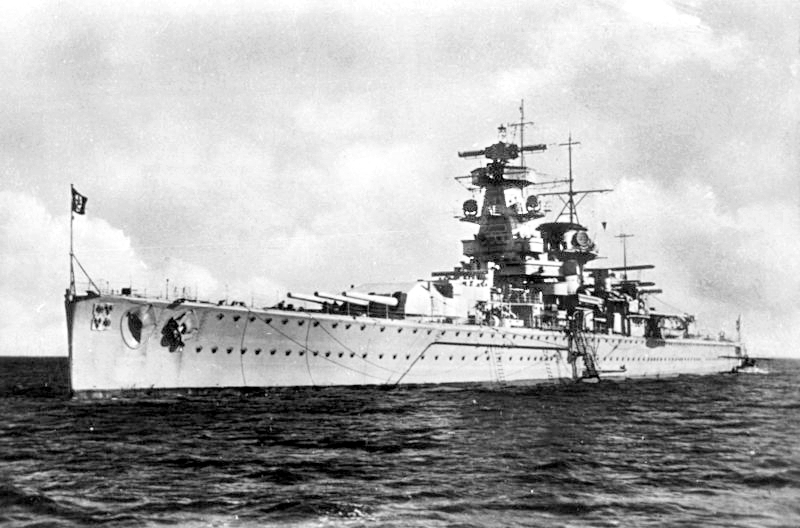
Panzerschiff Admiral Graf Spee

Following the outbreak of war between Germany and the Allies in September 1939, Adolf Hitler ordered the German Navy to begin commerce raiding against Allied merchant traffic.

Under the command of Kapitän zur See Hans Langsdorff, the German cruiser Admiral Graf Spee sailed from Wilhelmshaven on 21 August 1939, bound for the South Atlantic. She transited through the Denmark Strait, and out into the open ocean where she rendezvoused with her supply ship Altmark on 1 September at a position southwest of the Canary Islands. For the next three weeks Admiral Graf Spee remained in the mid-Atlantic until she received her orders to commence commerce raiding on 26 September.

Admiral Graf Spee was under strict instructions to adhere prize rules. This required her to stop and search all intercepted vessels for contraband before sinking them, and to also ensure that the crews of such vessels were safely evacuated prior to any action taking place. Initially the sortie was successful, and at the end of October Langsdorff sailed his ship into the Indian Ocean south of Madagascar. The purpose of that foray was to divert Allied warships away from the South Atlantic, and to confuse the Allies about his intentions. By this time, Admiral Graf Spee had cruised for almost 30,000 nautical miles (56,000 km; 35,000 mi) and needed an engine overhaul.

===== Interception =====
By November 1939, under the command of Captain Patrick Dove and with a crew complement of 28, Africa Shell was employed in the coastal waters around southeastern Africa, in the capacity of replenishing supplies of Avgas to be used by flying boats on the Empire Routes of Imperial Airways.

On 15 November, Africa Shell was plying through the Mozambique Channel en-passage from Quelimane to Lourenco Marques sailing in ballast. During the course of the morning, at a point 10 nautical miles (19 km; 12 mi) south-southwest from the lighthouse at Cape Zavora, she was spotted by Admiral Graf Spee which ordered her to stop by the firing of a shot across her bow. Africa Shell was not equipped with wireless telegraphy and therefore was not able to transmit the internationally recognised signal: R-R-R (I am being attacked by a raider).

Having stopped Africa Shell, a cutter with a boarding party was despatched from Admiral Graf Spee and subsequently boarded the tanker, the officer in charge addressing Captain Dove in perfect English with the sentence: "Good morning, captain. Sorry; fortunes of war." In time the boarding party ordered the ship's company, save Africa Shell's master, into their lifeboats before stripping Africa Shell of all foodstuffs including a small amount of wine. The crew were ordered to row for shore, however, Captain Dove was taken prisoner on board Admiral Graf Spee where he was to be held captive. Captain Dove was incensed by the interception of his ship, and complained personally to Kapitän Langsdorff, citing that Africa Shell was within Portuguese territorial waters and that the action was in clear violation of international law.

==== Sinking ====
With the crew of Africa Shell making their way to the shore, and with Captain Dove transferred to Admiral Graf Spee, the boarding party proceeded to set about the operation of sinking the tanker. Scuttling charges were placed within the ship, and their timers set, following which the party re-embarked in the motor launch and made their way back to the cruiser. With all personnel safely aboard the Admiral Graf Spee, Langsdorff and his crew observed the detonation of the charges which blew two holes in Africa Shell's stern. Following this the cruiser opened fire using some of her secondary armament of 15-centimetre (5.9 in) SK C/28 guns, sinking Africa Shell. Photographic evidence records the sinking.

Approximate position of Africa Shell's wreck

==== Aftermath ====
The crew of Africa Shell arrived safely later that day at Lourenco Marques. They reported the seizure of their ship immediately to local authorities, however their report mistakenly stated that they had been intercepted by the cruiser Admiral Scheer, as opposed to Admiral Graf Spee, something which only aided the confusion which the commerce raider's sortie had intended to sew.

Having sunk Africa Shell Langsdorff left the Indian Ocean, rounded the Cape of Good Hope and made passage back into the South Atlantic. Admiral Graf Spee's time in the Indian Ocean yielded a poor return for Langsdorff, the only success being the sinking of Africa Shell. Richer pickings were to be obtained in the Atlantic and further success was enjoyed by the cruiser, sinking Doric Star on 2 December and the cargo liner Tairoa on 3 December, before she rendezvoused with her supply ship Altmark late in the evening of 6 December. Admiral Graf Spee encountered her last victim on the evening of 7 December: the freighter Streonshalh.

Admiral Graf Spee subsequently retained Captain Dove along with Doric Star's five officers, including Captain William Stubbs, who were onboard Admiral Graf Spee along with other Allied prisoners when she took part in the Battle of the River Plate on 13 December. Following the battle, the damaged Admiral Graf Spee made passage to Montevideo and upon arrival all prisoners on board were released.

Captain Dove became friendly with Kapitän Langsdorff during his period of imprisonment onboard Graf Spee, and would later recall this in his book I Was Graf Spee's Prisoner. Dove's book provided the basis for the Michael Powell and Emeric Pressburger 1956 British war film The Battle of the River Plate, (released in the United States under the title Pursuit of the Graf Spee). In the film the character of Captain Dove is played by Bernard Lee, however Dove himself makes a cameo appearance as one of the other officers held onboard Admiral Graf Spee.

== Official number ==
Official numbers are issued by individual flag states. They should not be confused with IMO ship identification numbers. Africa Shell had the UK Official Number 167164.

== See also ==
- Battle of the Atlantic

== Sources ==
- Captain Patrick Dove (1940). I Was Graf Spee's Prisoner. London: Withy Grove Press. pp. 78, 80, 90, 92, 95, 96. ASIN B0016JJN3O.
- David Miller (2013). Command Decisions: Langsdorff and the Battle of the River Plate. London: Pen & Sword Books Ltd. Church Street, Barnsley, South Yorkshire. pp. 7, 10, 13, 16. ISBN 978-1-84884-490-2.
