= Microphis pleurostictus =

Conservation status
- Endangered (IUCN 3.1)

Scientific classification
- Kingdom: Animalia
- Phylum: Chordata
- Class: Actinopterygii
- Order: Syngnathiformes
- Family: Syngnathidae
- Genus: Microphis
- Species: M. pleurostictus

Binomial name
- Microphis pleurostictus Peters 1868

Species of fish

Microphis pleurostictus, the Luzon River pipefish (湖沼腹囊海龍), is a species of freshwater pipefish belonging to the family Syngnathidae.

It can be found only in Batu (Bato) Lake and Yassot Creek located in Luzon, Philippines. The species is ovoviviparous, where males brood eggs and give birth to live young.

The IUCN has listed the Luzon River pipefish as an endangered species on the shortlist of the most endangered Syngnathidae species. Only one pipefish is even more endangered by conservation status: the critically endangered estuarine pipefish, Syngnathus watermeyeri.
