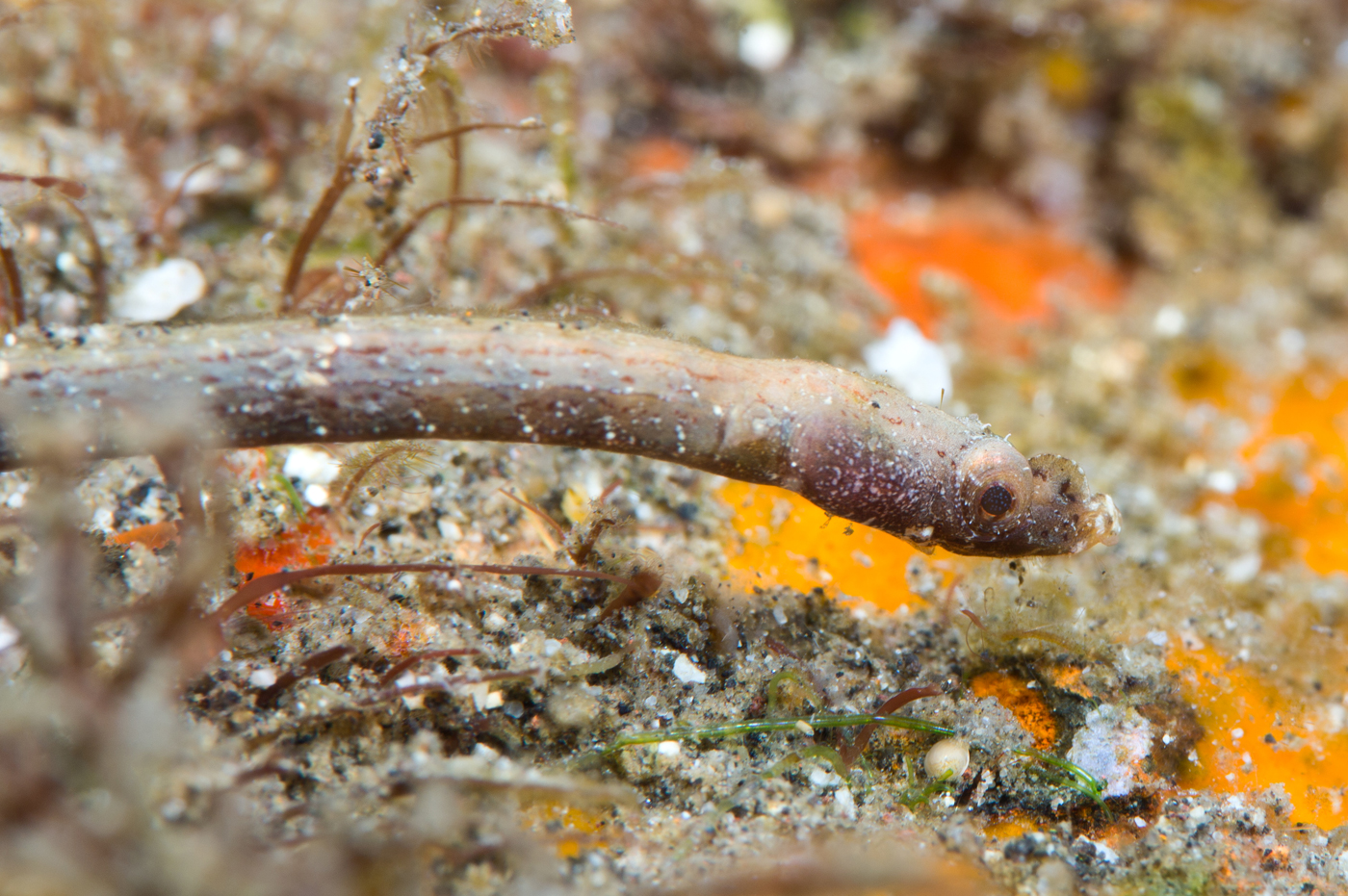

Conservation status
- Least Concern (IUCN 3.1)

Scientific classification
- Domain: Eukaryota
- Kingdom: Animalia
- Phylum: Chordata
- Class: Actinopterygii
- Order: Syngnathiformes
- Family: Syngnathidae
- Genus: Halicampus
- Species: H. dunckeri

Binomial name
- Halicampus dunckeri (Chabanaud, 1929)

Synonyms
- Micrognathus dunckeri Chabanaud, 1929

= Halicampus dunckeri =

Species of fish

Halicampus dunckeri or also commonly known as the Duncker's pipefish or ridgenose pipefish is a species of fish in the family Syngnathidae.

== Description ==
The Duncker's pipefish is a small sized fish that can reach a maximum length of 15 cm. It has a thin and elongate body with reduced fins which are difficult to observe. The body color is highly variable from one individual to another ranging from creamy white to dark brown through redish to yellowish. The dorsal part of the body is full of small whitish skin growths as well as irregular pale bars. Its head is rather small with large eyes, the snout is short with a characteristic whitish part at its tip.

== Distribution ==
The ridgenose pipefish is widespread throughout the tropical and subtropical waters of the Indo-West Pacific from the eastern coast of Africa, Red Sea included, until Salomon Islands and from South Japan to the Great Barrier Reef.

The ridgenose pipefish is found close to the bottom between the surface and 25 meters deep.

It prefers areas such as reef, sandy bottom or coral rubble with algae or debris in which it can easily hide.

== Biology ==
Like many of their congeners belonging to the family of Pipefishes, the Duncker's pipefish has a benthic lifestyle and is ovoviviparous.

Its reproduction occurs during a courtship where the female will transfer her eggs in the ventral surface of the male between skin folds forming a kind of protective pouch in which he will fertilize them and protect them during the incubation period.

The Duncker's pipefish is a carnivore. Its diet is based on small crustaceans and other invertebrates which it aspires through its tubular snout.

== Etymology ==
The fish is named in honor of ichthyologist Georg Duncker (1870-1953), of the Zoological Museum Hamburg, who revised the pipefish family in 1915.
