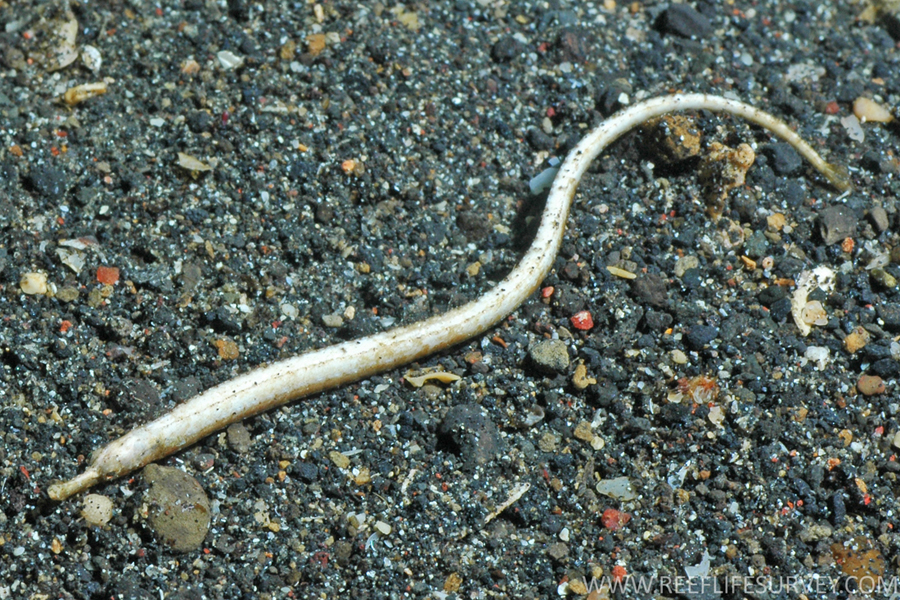

Conservation status
- Least Concern (IUCN 3.1)

Scientific classification
- Domain: Eukaryota
- Kingdom: Animalia
- Phylum: Chordata
- Class: Actinopterygii
- Order: Syngnathiformes
- Family: Syngnathidae
- Genus: Halicampus
- Species: H. brocki

Binomial name
- Halicampus brocki Herald, 1953

Synonyms
- Micrognathus brocki Herald, 1953

= Halicampus brocki =

Tasselled pipefish

Species of fish

Halicampus brocki, the tasselled pipefish, or Brock's pipefish, is a species of marine fish of the family Syngnathidae. It is found in the Indo-Pacific, from southern Japan, Guam and the Marshall Islands to the central east and west coasts of Australia. It lives on coral and rocky reefs with algae, to depths of 45 metres (148 ft). It can grow to lengths of 12 centimetres (4.7 in), and is expected to feed on small crustaceans, similar to other pipefish. This species is ovoviviparous, with males carrying eggs and giving birth to live young.

== Etymology ==
The specific name honours Vernon E. Brock who was the Director of the Fish and Game Department in Honolulu.

== Identification ==
This species can be identified by its slender body, long, branched filaments on the head, and short skin flaps on the body. It is whitish, yellowish, or pale brown, often with brown bars on the snout and pale bars on the body.
