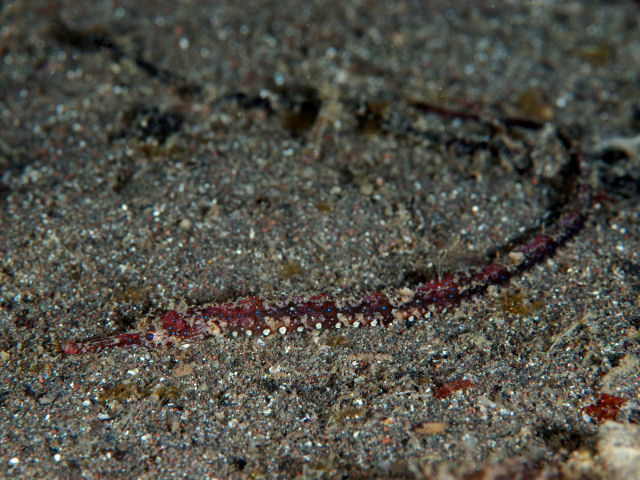

Conservation status
- Least Concern (IUCN 3.1)

Scientific classification
- Domain: Eukaryota
- Kingdom: Animalia
- Phylum: Chordata
- Class: Actinopterygii
- Order: Syngnathiformes
- Family: Syngnathidae
- Genus: Halicampus
- Species: H. punctatus

Binomial name
- Halicampus punctatus Kamohara, 1952

Synonyms
- Yozia punctata Kamohara, 1952

= Halicampus punctatus =

Starry pipefish

Species of fish

The starry pipefish (Halicampus punctatus) is a species of marine fish of the family Syngnathidae. It is endemic to Japan, found near Honshu, Kyushu, and Okinawa, where it lives in open sandy areas near reefs. It can grow to lengths of 17 centimetres (6.7 in). It is expected to feed on small crustaceans, similar to other pipefish. This species is ovoviviparous, with males carrying eggs before giving birth to live young. Males may brood at around 10 centimetres (3.9 in).
