= Patrick Dove (sea captain) =

British naval officer (1896–1957)

Captain Patrick Dove
- Born: 1896; London, United Kingdom
- Died: 25 May 1957 (aged 60–61); At sea
- Occupation: Ship captain
- Employer(s): Shell Company of East Africa Ltd. - Anglo-Saxon Petroleum Co. Ltd., London
- Known for: Author of the book: I Was Graf Spee's Prisoner.

Patrick G. G. (Paddy) Dove (1896–1957) was a British merchant navy officer who served as Master of the MV Africa Shell when she was intercepted and sunk by the German pocket battleship Admiral Graf Spee in the Mozambique Channel, off the coast of Portuguese East Africa, becoming the sixth victim of Graf Spee's commerce raiding sortie.

Following the seizure and sinking of his ship, Captain Dove became friendly with Kapitän zur See (KzS) Hans Langsdorff during his period of imprisonment aboard the Graf Spee, and would later recall this in his book: I Was Graf Spee's Prisoner.

== Biography ==
Patrick Dove was born in London in 1896. He became a ship's officer and worked for the Shell Company of East Africa Ltd, gaining command of their new coastal tanker the MV Africa Shell following her entry into service in 1939.

By November 1939 Africa Shell was employed in the coastal waters around southeastern Africa, under the command of Captain Dove and with a crew complement of 28.

=== Interception by Graf Spee ===
On 15 November Africa Shell was plying through the Mozambique Channel en-passage from Quelimane to Lourenco Marques sailing in ballast. During the course of the morning, at a point 10 nautical miles (19 km; 12 mi) south-southwest from the lighthouse at Cape Zavora, she was spotted by the Graf Spee who ordered her to stop by the firing of a shot across her bow.

Having stopped the Africa Shell, a cutter with a boarding party was despatched from the Graf Spee and subsequently boarded the tanker, the officer in charge addressing Captain Dove in perfect English with the sentence: "Good morning, captain. Sorry; fortunes of war."

In time the boarding party ordered the ship's company, save Captain Dove, into their lifeboats before stripping the Africa Shell of all foodstuffs including a small amount of wine. The crew were ordered to row for shore, however Captain Dove was taken prisoner on board the Graf Spee where he was to be held captive. Capt. Dove was incensed by the interception of his ship, and complained personally to KzS. Langsdorff, citing that the Africa Shell was within Portuguese territorial waters and that the action was in clear violation of international law.

=== Sinking ===
With the crew of the Africa Shell making their way to the shore, and with Capt. Dove transferred to the Graf Spee, the boarding party proceeded to set about the operation of sinking the tanker. Scuttling charges were placed within the ship, and their timers set, following which the party re-embarked in the motor launch and made their way back to the Graf Spee. With all personnel safely aboard the Graf Spee, Langsdorff and his crew observed the detonation of the charges which blew two holes in the Africa Shell's stern. Following this Graf Spee opened fire using some of her secondary armament of 15 cm (5.9 in) SK C/28 guns, sinking the Africa Shell. Photographic evidence records the sinking.

Approximate position of Africa Shell's wreck

=== Aftermath ===
The crew of the Africa Shell arrived safely later that day at Lourenco Marques. They reported the seizure of their ship immediately to local authorities, however their report mistakenly stated that they had been intercepted by the Panzerschiff Admiral Scheer, as opposed to the Graf Spee, something which only aided the confusion which the commerce raider's sortie had intended to sow.

Having sunk the Africa Shell, Langsdorff left the Indian Ocean, rounded the Cape of Good Hope and made passage into the South Atlantic. His time in the Indian Ocean yielded a poor return for Langsdorff, the only success being the sinking of the Africa Shell.

Graf Spee subsequently retained Captain Dove onboard along with other Allied prisoners when she took part in the Battle of the River Plate on 13 December. Following the battle, the damaged Graf Spee made passage to Montevideo and upon arrival all prisoners on board were released.

Following his release from the Graf Spee, Capt. Dove returned to England and recorded his memories of his time in captivity on the Graf Spee, including a candid account of the character of Kapitän Langsdorff in his book I Was Graf Spee's Prisoner, published in 1940.

The book formed part of the compilation for the 1940 film For Freedom in which Capt. Dove makes an appearance. Dove's book also provided the basis for the Michael Powell and Emeric Pressburger 1956 British war film The Battle of the River Plate, (released in the United States under the title Pursuit of the Graf Spee), in which Capt. Dove is credited as a technical adviser. In the film, Dove was played by Bernard Lee; Dove himself makes a cameo appearance as one of the other officers held onboard Graf Spee.

== Death ==
Captain Patrick Dove died on 25 May 1957 aboard his ship, the tanker Alva Cape which was in Indonesian waters.

== Sources ==
- Captain Patrick Dove (1940). I Was Graf Spee's Prisoner. London: Withy Grove Press. pp. 78, 80, 90, 92, 95, 96. ASIN B0016JJN3O.
- David Miller (2013). Command Decisions: Langsdorff and the Battle of the River Plate. London: Pen & Sword Books Ltd. Church Street, Barnsley, South Yorkshire. pp. 7, 10, 13, 16. ISBN 978-1-84884-490-2.
