= Zavora =

- Location within Mozambique
- Coordinates: 24°31′S 35°12′E
- Country: Mozambique
- Province: Inhambane
- District: Inharrime

Population (2006)
  - Total: approx 10,000
- Area code: +258

Zavora is a beach, north east of Maputo in Mozambique, in the district of Inharrime, province of Inhambane. It is located 420 km north east of Maputo, the capital of Mozambique, and 27 km east from the town of Inharrime. The capital of the province, the city of Inhambane, is approximately 2 hours drive away towards the North East.

The correct Portuguese spelling is Závora, and some maps refer to the area as "Ponta de Závora", Portuguese for "Tip of Zavora" or "Praia de Závora" meaning "Beach of Zavora". The origin of the name Zavora is not known.

There is also a fish called Zavora-pypvis (Afrikaans language), or translated Zavora-pipefish. The biological name is Halicampus zavorensis from the family Syngnathidae. According to one reference it is a fish found in Western Indian Ocean: known only from one specimen from Zavora, Mozambique and two from Sur, Oman.

The word Zavora is also used as a surname in some languages and therefore the town's name could have originated from a person.

Although the local people can speak Shangaan and Portuguese, the local language is Chopi. English is limited to mostly businesses and lodges.

Zavora is mostly known for its beautiful natural reef and one of few remaining lighthouses along this coast. The reef makes it a popular vacation location and attracts many visitors during holidays, especially, South Africa. There remains some old buildings that still exist from after the Portuguese left Mozambique. These are currently used as accommodation by a local lodge.

Most of the people make a living from fishing and farming of small crops.

Zavora is also home to one of few remaining lighthouses in Mozambique. The tower of 53 feet was built in 1910 and is still operational with 10sec interval light flashes in aid to passing ships etc. The grounds are open to the public. It was at a position 10 nautical miles (19 km; 12 mi) south-southwaet of the Cape Zavora lighthouse where the coastal tanker Africa Shell was intercepted and sunk by the German Pocket Battleship Admiral Graff Spee on November 15, 1939, being the sixth victim of Graf Spee's commerce raiding sortie.

According to some reference, a Dutch liner, the Klipfontein, struck a submerged reef, 5 miles from Cape Barra near Inhambane on 8 January 1953. In an SA news release this area where the ship sank was referred to as Cape Zavora (Portuguese East Africa) This newsalert doubted that it could have been a submerged reef and referred to it as a hidden 'obstacle'.
