= Georg Duncker =

German ichthyologist (1870–1953)

Paul Georg Egmont Duncker
- Born: 6 May 1870; Hamburg, Kingdom of Prussia, German Empire
- Died: 28 July 1953 (aged 83); Ahrensburg, Kingdom of Prussia, German Empire
- Education: University of Kiel; University of Freiburg; Humboldt University of Berlin

Paul Georg Egmont Duncker (6 May 1870, Hamburg – 28 July 1953, Ahrensburg) was a German ichthyologist.

== Biography ==
He studied at the universities of Kiel, Freiburg, and Berlin, receiving his doctorate at Kiel in 1895. Following graduation he lived and worked in Karlsruhe, Plymouth, Naples, Cold Spring Harbor (Long Island N.Y.), and Würzburg. From 1901 he worked as a curator for a year at the Selangor State Museum in Kuala Lumpur, afterwards returning to Europe, where he spent another year in Naples.

He was a member of the Hamburg Südsee-Expedition (1908-10) during its first year in Oceania, of which, he collected specimens on behalf of the Hamburg Zoological Museum. From 1928 onward, he worked as a curator and professor at the Museum. In 1939 he became an honorary member of the American Society of Ichthyologists and Herpetologists.

In 1904 he described the Harlequin rasbora, Trigonostigma heteromorpha, a fish species that inhabits the forest streams of Southeast Asia.

== Taxon named in his honor ==
Taxa with the specific epithet of dunckeri honor his name, such as:

- Barbodes dunckeri (Ahl 1929), sometimes referred to as a bigspot barb.
- Phallostethus dunckeri (Regan 1913).
- Solegnathus dunckeri (Whitley, 1927), sometimes referred to as Duncker's pipehorse.
- Halicampus dunckeri or also commonly known as the Duncker's pipefish or ridgenose pipefish is a species of fish in the family Syngnathidae. that is named after him.

== Published works ==
- Die Fische der malayischen Halbinsel, In: Mitteilungen aus dem Naturhistorischen Museum in Hamburg, volume 21 (1904) – Fish of the Malay Peninsula.
- Die Gattungen der Syngnathidae, In: Mitteilungen aus dem Naturhistorischen Museum in Hamburg, volume 19 (1912) – Genera of the family Syngnathidae.

== Taxon described by him ==
- See Category:Taxa named by Georg Duncker
