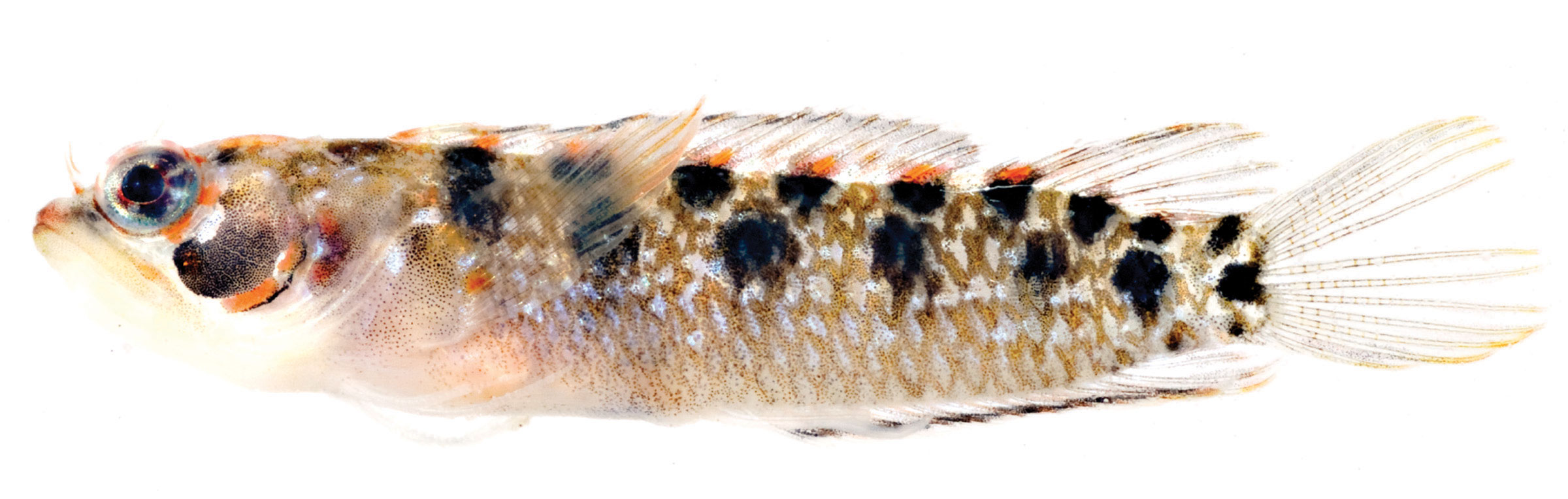
- Male (length 18 mm)
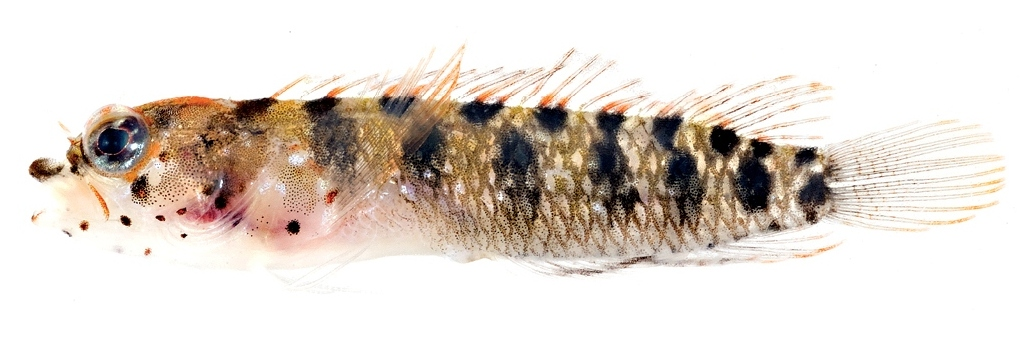
- Female (length 16 mm)

Conservation status
- Least Concern (IUCN 3.1)

Scientific classification
- Kingdom: Animalia
- Phylum: Chordata
- Class: Actinopterygii
- Order: Blenniiformes
- Family: Labrisomidae
- Genus: Starksia
- Species: S. langi

Binomial name
- Starksia langi C. C. Baldwin & Castillo, 2011
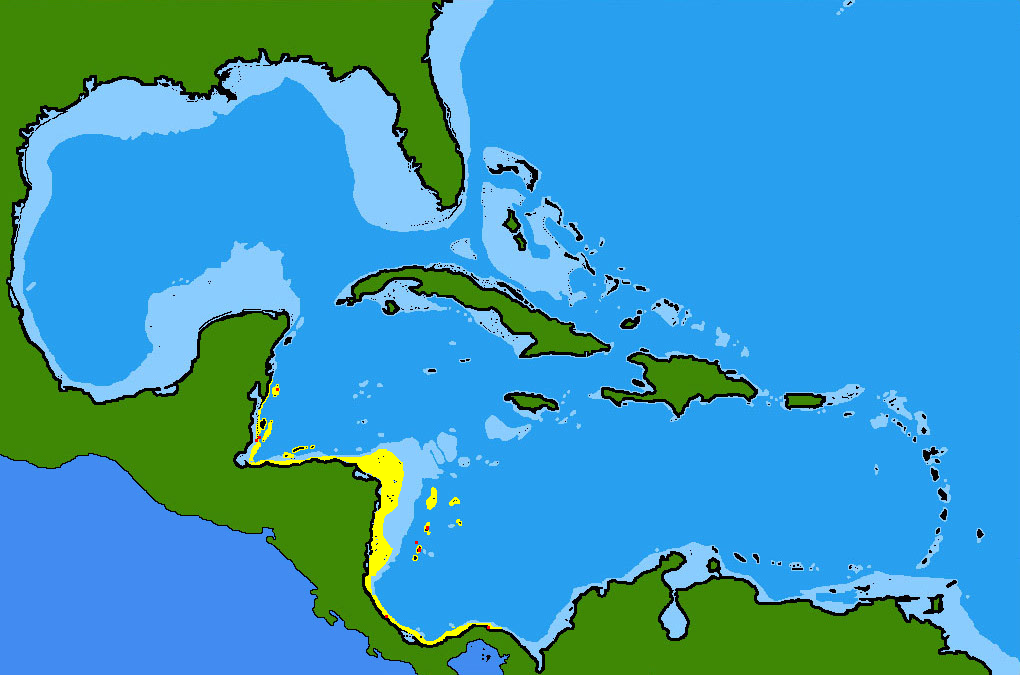

= Starksia langi =

Species of fish

Starksia langi, the Lang's blenny, is a species of labrisomid blenny native to the Caribbean coast of Central America, found in Belize, Honduras, and Panama. It is found in shallow waters of usually 3 m (9.8 ft) or less. This species reach a length of 1.7 cm (0.67 in) SL. It is named after Michael A. Lang, Director of the Smithsonian Marine Science Network and Smithsonian Science Diving Program. It is a prey of the lionfish.
