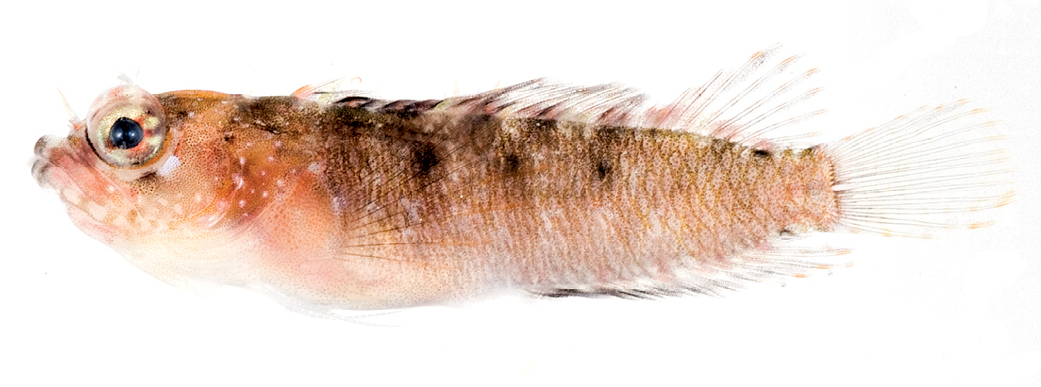
- Adult male (15 mm length)
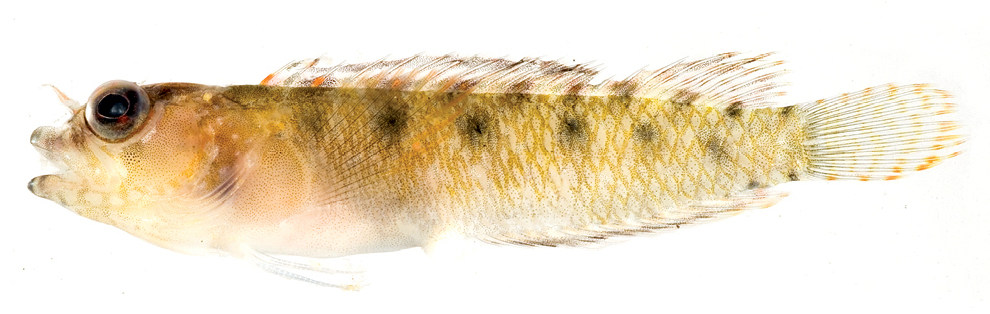
- Adult female (19 mm length)

Conservation status
- Least Concern (IUCN 3.1)

Scientific classification
- Kingdom: Animalia
- Phylum: Chordata
- Class: Actinopterygii
- Order: Blenniiformes
- Family: Labrisomidae
- Genus: Starksia
- Species: S. greenfieldi

Binomial name
- Starksia greenfieldi C. C. Baldwin & Castillo, 2011
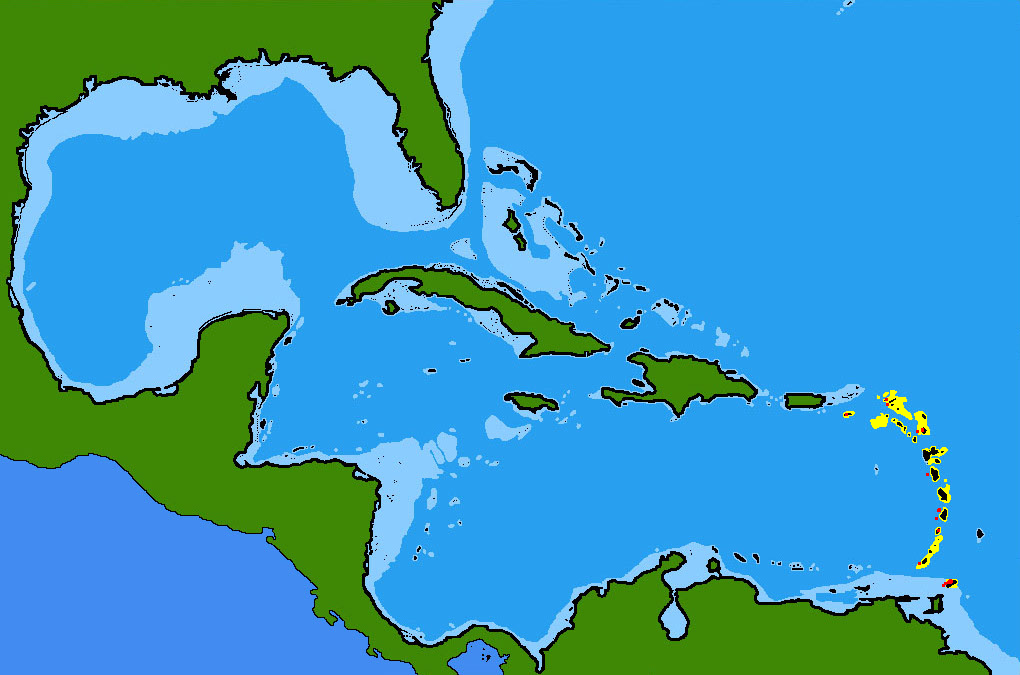

= Starksia greenfieldi =

Species of fish

Starksia greenfieldi, the Greenfield's blenny, is a species of labrisomid blenny endemic to the waters around the island of Tobago where it is found at depths of from 5 to 12 metres (16 to 39 ft). It is named after David W. Greenfield, known for his work on blenniiform fishes. This species can reach a length of 1.9 centimetres (0.75 in) SL.
