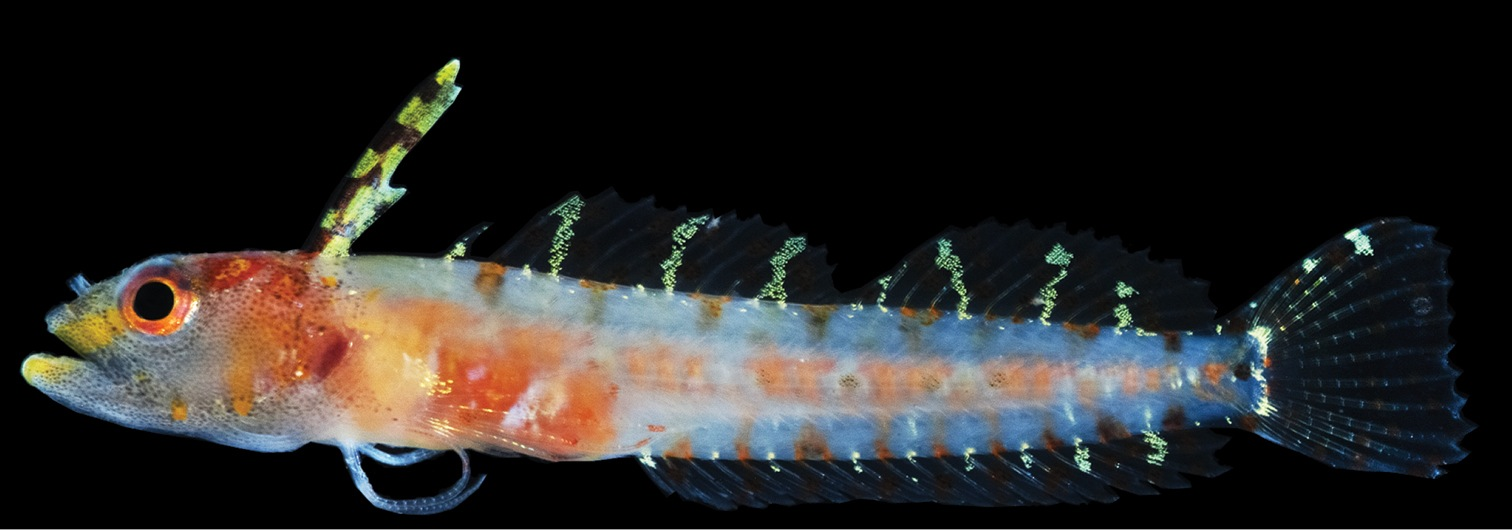
- holotype against a dark backdrop

Conservation status
- Data Deficient (IUCN 3.1)

Scientific classification
- Kingdom: Animalia
- Phylum: Chordata
- Class: Actinopterygii
- Order: Blenniiformes
- Family: Labrisomidae
- Genus: Haptoclinus
- Species: H. dropi

Binomial name
- Haptoclinus dropi C. C. Baldwin & D. R. Robertson, 2013

= Haptoclinus dropi =

Species of fish

Haptoclinus dropi, the Four-fin blenny, is a species of labrisomid blenny only known to occur off of Curaçao in the Caribbean where it was collected from a deep-sea reef at a depth between 157 and 167 metres (515 and 548 ft). The only specimen collected, a female, measured 2.15 centimetres (0.85 in) SL.

== Etymology ==
The species is named after the Smithsonian Institution's Deep Reef Observation Project (DROP), under which program this species was discovered. The proposed common name, "Four-fin blenny", is based on the species' dorsal fin configuration.
