= Starksia brasiliensis =

Conservation status
- Least Concern (IUCN 3.1)

Scientific classification
- Kingdom: Animalia
- Phylum: Chordata
- Class: Actinopterygii
- Order: Blenniiformes
- Family: Labrisomidae
- Genus: Starksia
- Species: S. brasiliensis

Binomial name
- Starksia brasiliensis (C. H. Gilbert, 1900)

Synonyms
- Brannerella brasiliensis C. H. Gilbert, 1900

Species of fish

Starksia brasiliensis is a species of labrisomid blenny native to the Atlantic coast of Brazil. This species can reach a length of 3.5 centimetres (1.4 in) TL.
