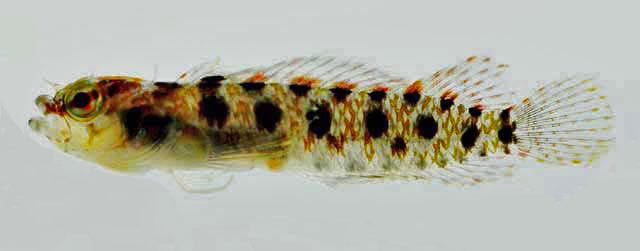
- Male
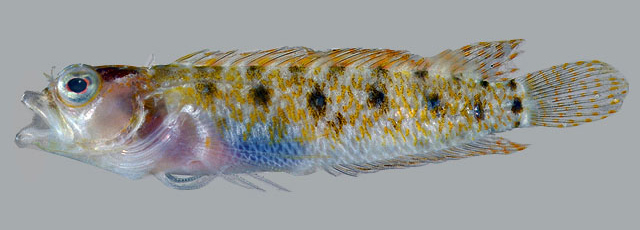
- Female

Conservation status
- Least Concern (IUCN 3.1)

Scientific classification
- Kingdom: Animalia
- Phylum: Chordata
- Class: Actinopterygii
- Order: Blenniiformes
- Family: Labrisomidae
- Genus: Starksia
- Species: S. sluiteri

Binomial name
- Starksia sluiteri (Metzelaar, 1919)
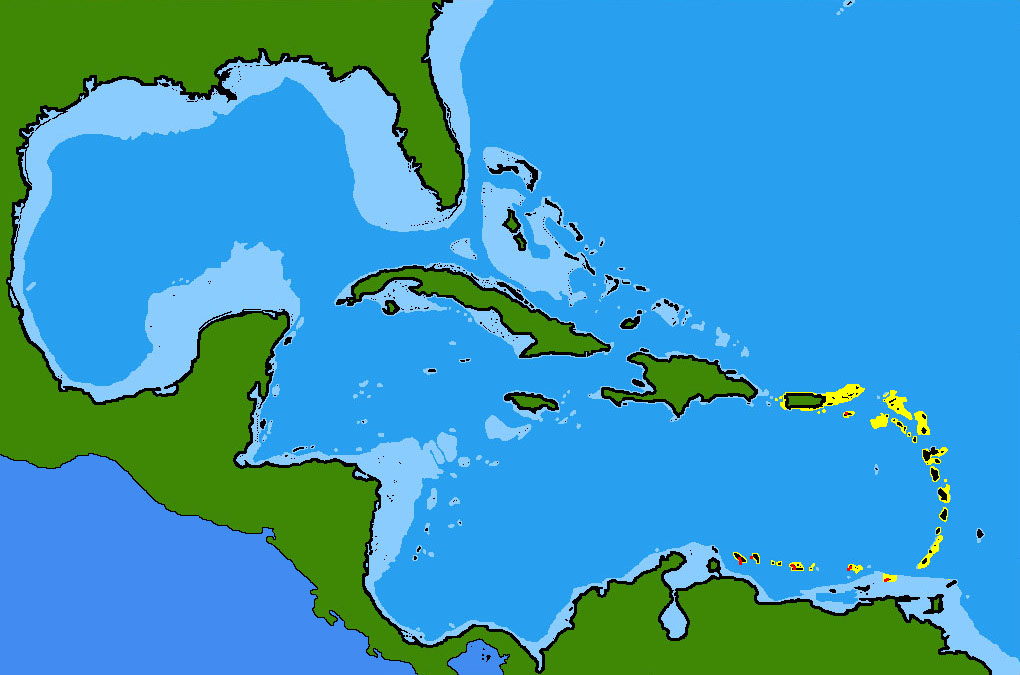

Synonyms
- Brannerella sluiteri Metzelaar, 1919

= Starksia sluiteri =

Species of fish

Starksia sluiteri, the chessboard blenny, is a species of labrisomid blenny native to the Caribbean Sea and the Atlantic Ocean along the coast of Brazil including Atol das Rocas and St. Paul's Rocks. This species is an inhabitant of reefs where it prefers areas with rubble or crevices in which to hide. It can be found at depths of from 5 to 40 m (16 to 131 ft). This species can reach a length of 2.8 cm (1.1 in) SL. The specific name honours the Dutch biologist and anatomist Carel Philip Sluiter (1854-1933), a specialist in tunicates.
