= Starksia hoesei =

Conservation status
- Data Deficient (IUCN 3.1)

Scientific classification
- Kingdom: Animalia
- Phylum: Chordata
- Class: Actinopterygii
- Order: Blenniiformes
- Family: Labrisomidae
- Genus: Starksia
- Species: S. hoesei

Binomial name
- Starksia hoesei Rosenblatt & L. R. Taylor, 1971
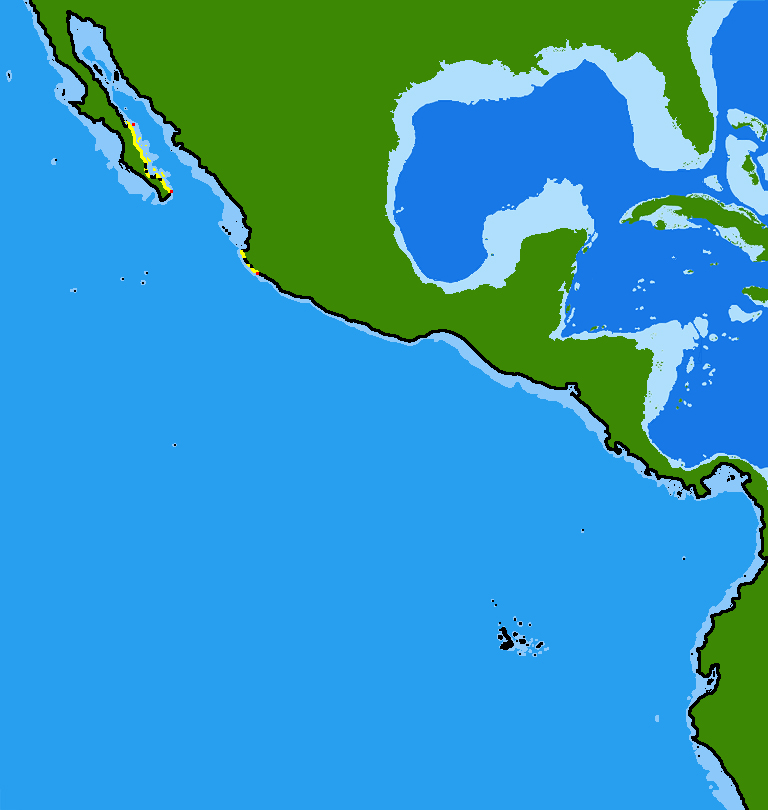

Species of fish

Starksia hoesei, the hose blenny, is a species of labrisomid blenny native to the eastern Pacific Ocean and the Gulf of California where it is known to occur at depths of from 24 to 32 m (79 to 105 ft). The specific name honours the ichthyologist Douglass F. Hoese of the Australian Museum in Sydney.
