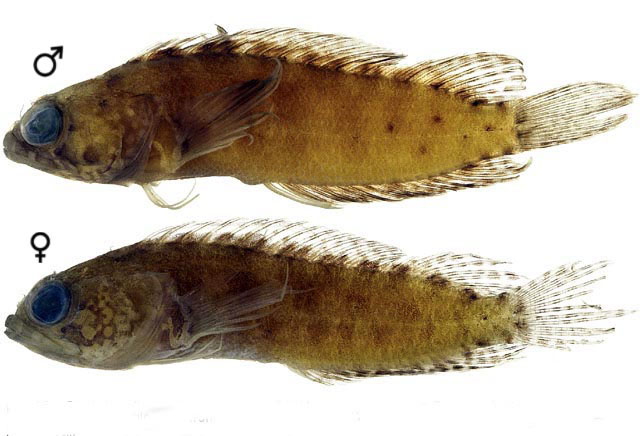

Conservation status
- Data Deficient (IUCN 3.1)

Scientific classification
- Kingdom: Animalia
- Phylum: Chordata
- Class: Actinopterygii
- Order: Blenniiformes
- Family: Labrisomidae
- Genus: Starksia
- Species: S. sella

Binomial name
- Starksia sella J. T. Williams & Mounts, 2003
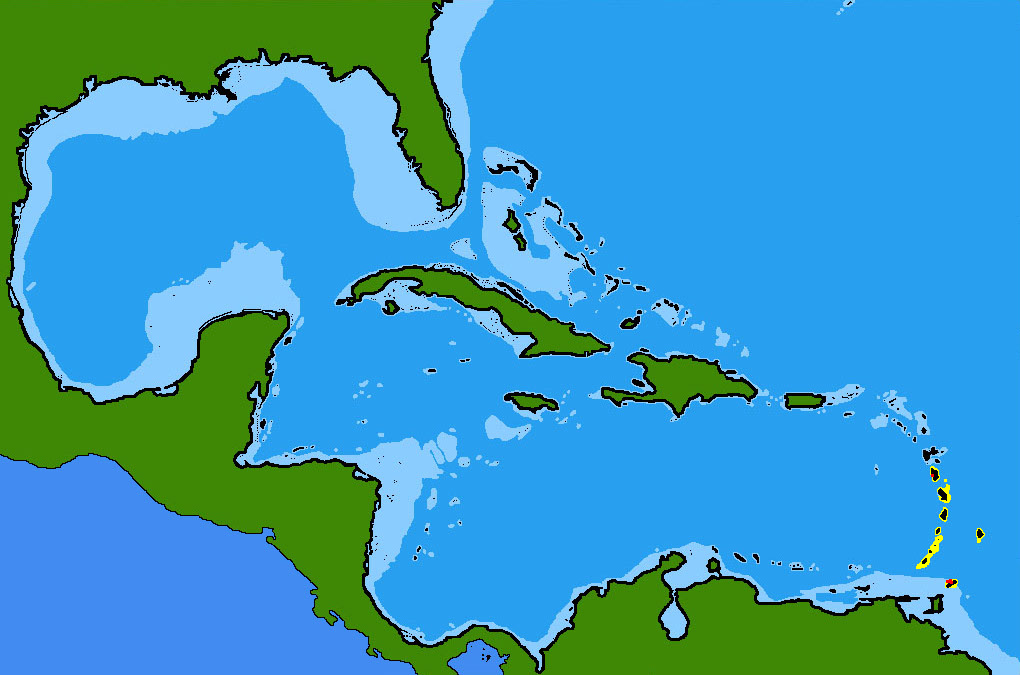

= Starksia sella =

Species of fish

Starksia sella, the darksaddle blenny, is a species of labrisomid blenny endemic to the waters around the island of Tobago. It is an inhabitant of reefs, being found at depths of from 5 to 29 metres (16 to 95 ft). This species can reach a length of 2.9 centimetres (1.1 in) SL.
