= Starksia cremnobates =

Conservation status
- Least Concern (IUCN 3.1)

Scientific classification
- Kingdom: Animalia
- Phylum: Chordata
- Class: Actinopterygii
- Order: Blenniiformes
- Family: Labrisomidae
- Genus: Starksia
- Species: S. cremnobates

Binomial name
- Starksia cremnobates (C. H. Gilbert, 1890)
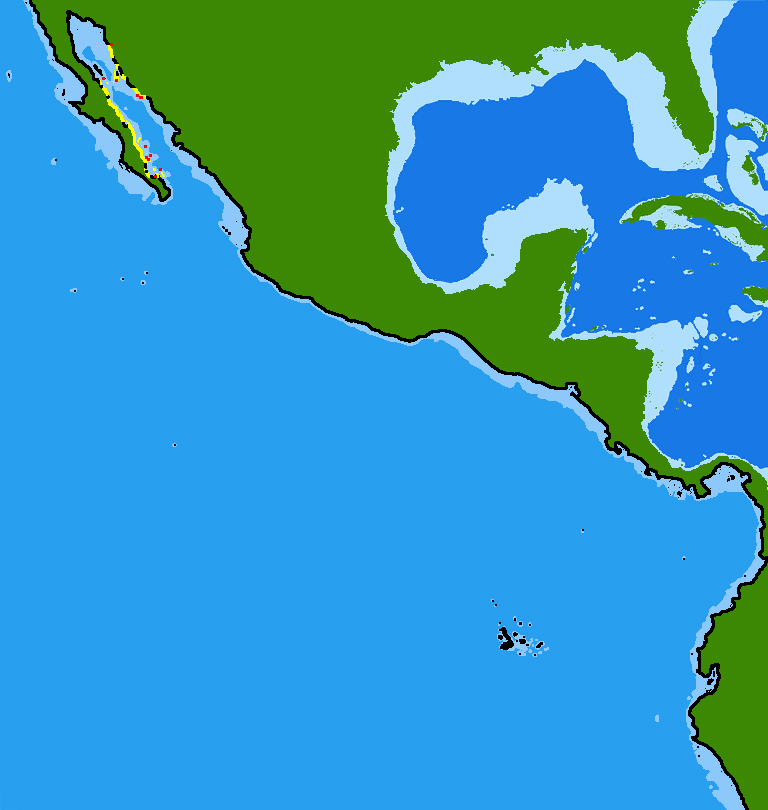

Synonyms
- Labrosomus cremnobates C. H. Gilbert, 1890

Species of fish

Starksia cremnobates, the fugitive blenny, is a species of labrisomid blenny endemic to the Gulf of California where it is found at depths of around 60 metres (200 ft).
