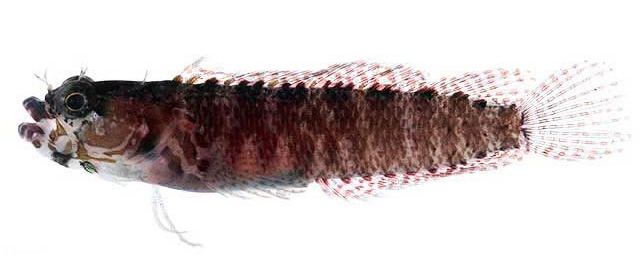

Conservation status
- Data Deficient (IUCN 3.1)

Scientific classification
- Kingdom: Animalia
- Phylum: Chordata
- Class: Actinopterygii
- Order: Blenniiformes
- Family: Labrisomidae
- Genus: Starksia
- Species: S. leucovitta

Binomial name
- Starksia leucovitta J. T. Williams & Mounts, 2003
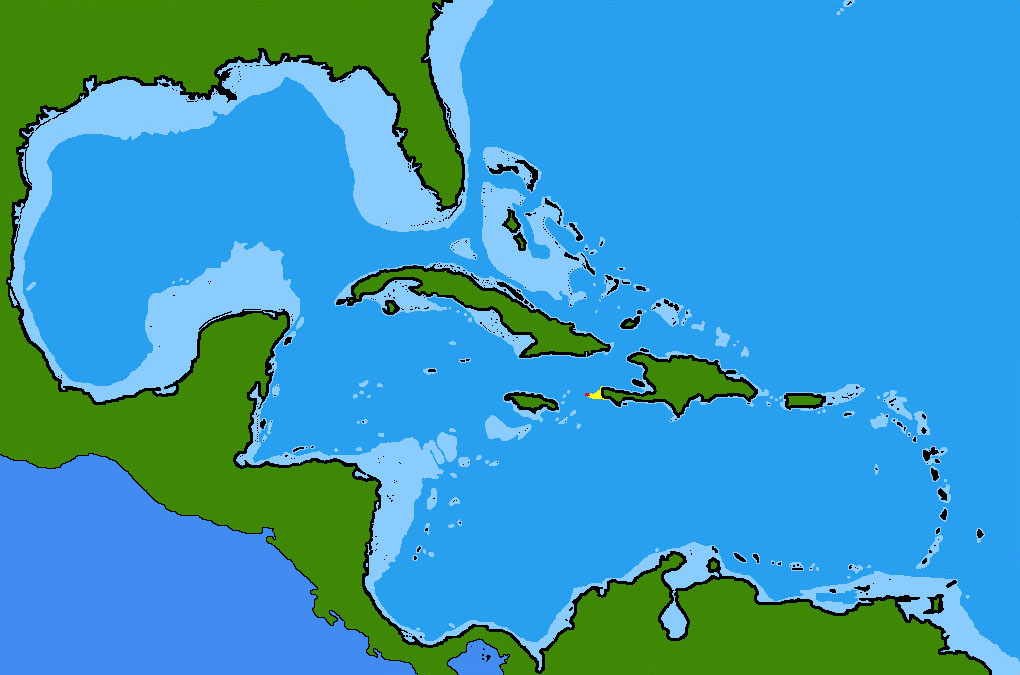

= Starksia leucovitta =

Species of fish

Starksia leucovitta, the whitesaddle blenny, is a species of labrisomid blenny only known to occur on the reefs around Navassa Island in the Caribbean Sea where it can be found from near the surface to a depth of 30 m (98 ft). This species can reach a length of 2.5 cm (0.98 in) SL.
