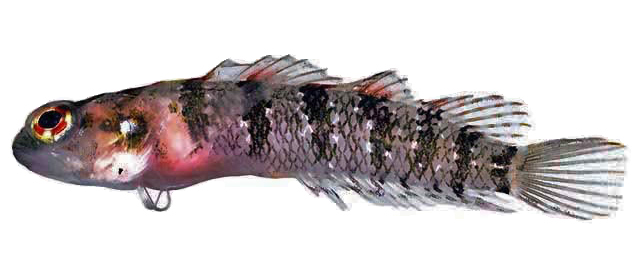

Conservation status
- Least Concern (IUCN 3.1)

Scientific classification
- Kingdom: Animalia
- Phylum: Chordata
- Class: Actinopterygii
- Order: Blenniiformes
- Family: Labrisomidae
- Genus: Starksia
- Species: S. elongata

Binomial name
- Starksia elongata C. R. Gilbert, 1971
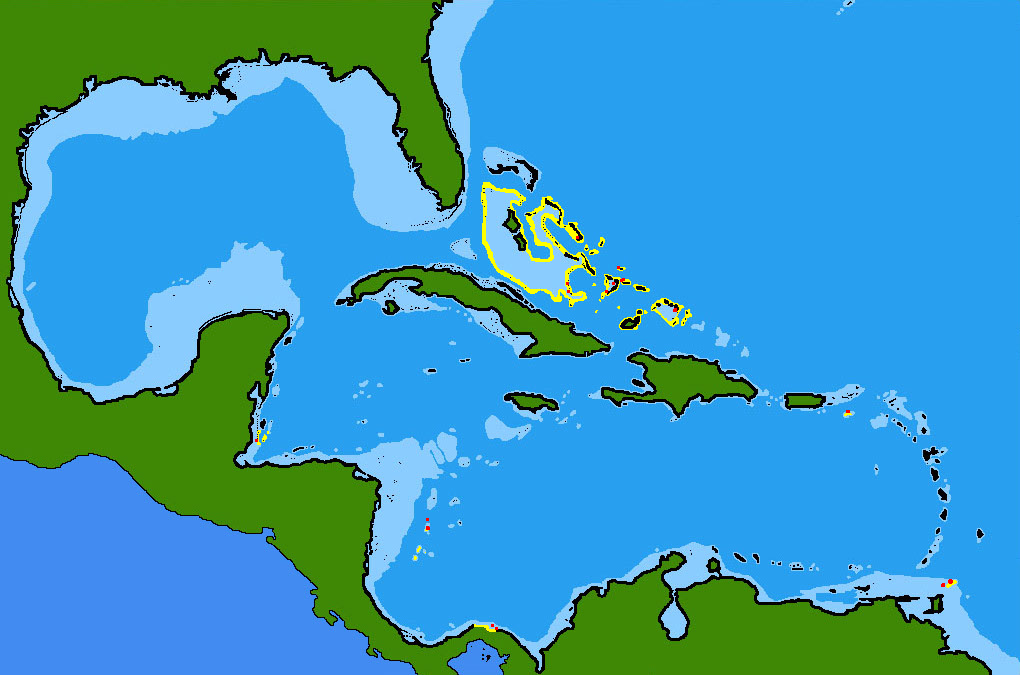

= Starksia elongata =

Species of fish

Starksia elongata, the elongate blenny, is a species of labrisomid blenny native to reefs of the western Atlantic Ocean and the Caribbean Sea. This species can reach a length of 2.3 centimetres (0.91 in) SL.
