= Starksia guadalupae =

Conservation status
- Least Concern (IUCN 3.1)

Scientific classification
- Kingdom: Animalia
- Phylum: Chordata
- Class: Actinopterygii
- Order: Blenniiformes
- Family: Labrisomidae
- Genus: Starksia
- Species: S. guadalupae

Binomial name
- Starksia guadalupae Rosenblatt & L. R. Taylor, 1971

Species of fish

Starksia guadalupae, the Guadalupe blenny, is a species of labrisomid blenny native to the Pacific coast of Mexico where it is found at depths of from 9 to 18 m (30 to 59 ft).
