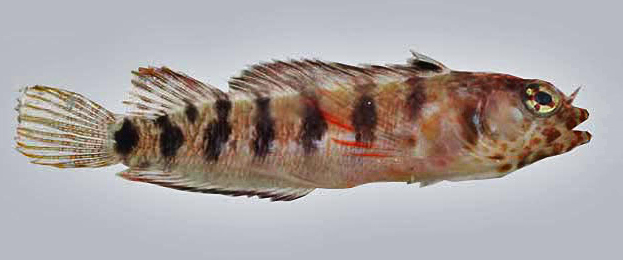
- Male
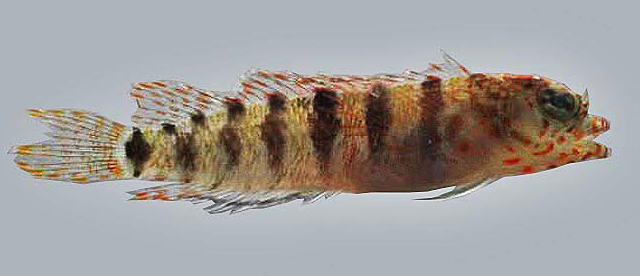
- Female

Conservation status
- Least Concern (IUCN 3.1)

Scientific classification
- Kingdom: Animalia
- Phylum: Chordata
- Class: Actinopterygii
- Order: Blenniiformes
- Family: Labrisomidae
- Genus: Starksia
- Species: S. smithvanizi

Binomial name
- Starksia smithvanizi J. T. Williams & Mounts, 2003
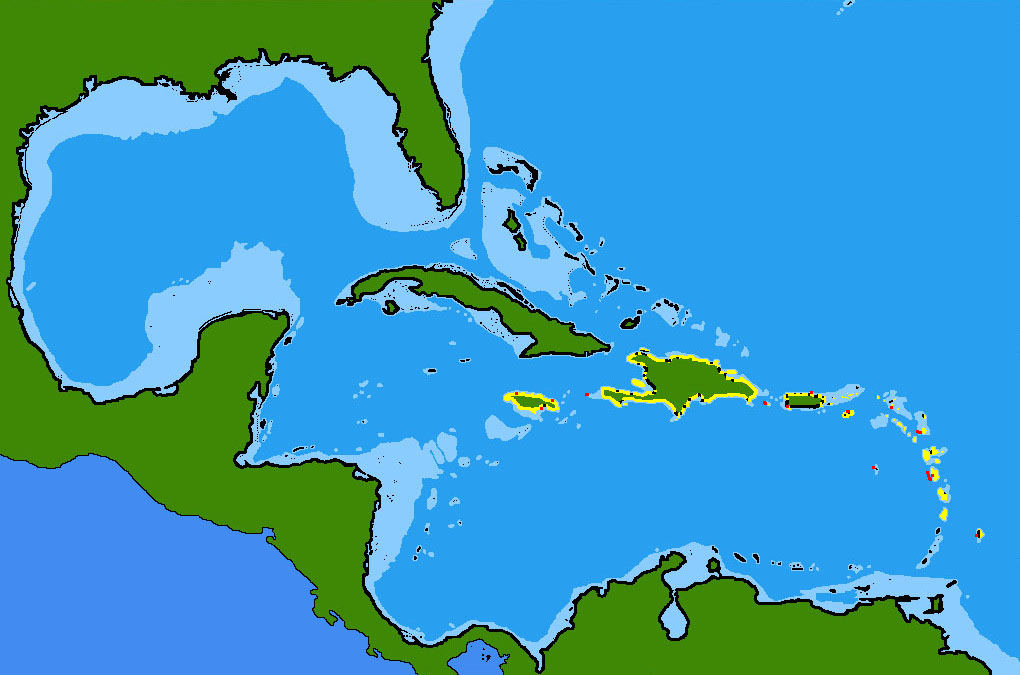

= Starksia smithvanizi =

Species of fish

Starksia smithvanizi, the brokenbar blenny, is a species of labrisomid blenny native to the Caribbean Sea. It is found on reefs around islands at depths of from very shallow waters to 6 m (20 ft). This species can reach a length of 2 cm (0.79 in) SL. The specific name honours the ichthyologist William F. Smith-Vaniz.
