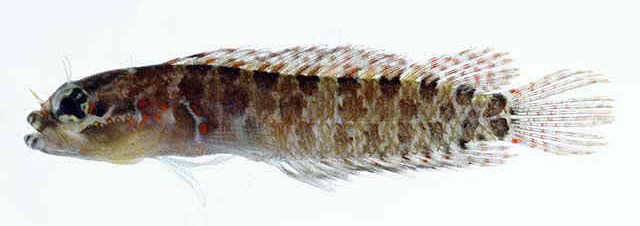
- Starksia occidentalis
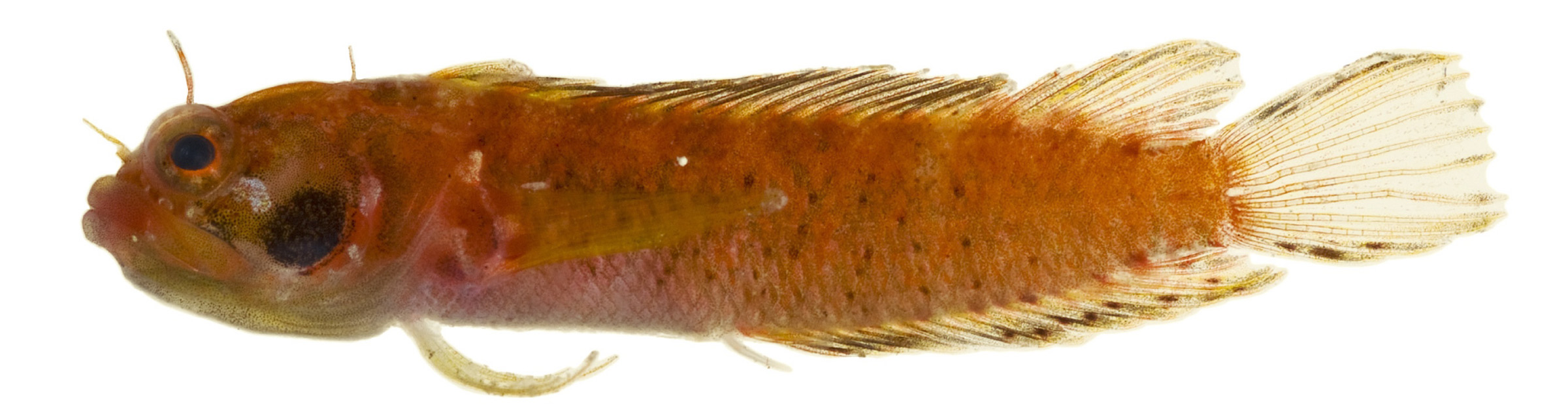
- Starksia williamsi

Scientific classification
- Kingdom: Animalia
- Phylum: Chordata
- Class: Actinopterygii
- Order: Blenniiformes
- Family: Labrisomidae
- Genus: Starksia; D. S. Jordan & Evermann, 1896

Type species
- Labrosomus cremnobates C. H. Gilbert, 1890
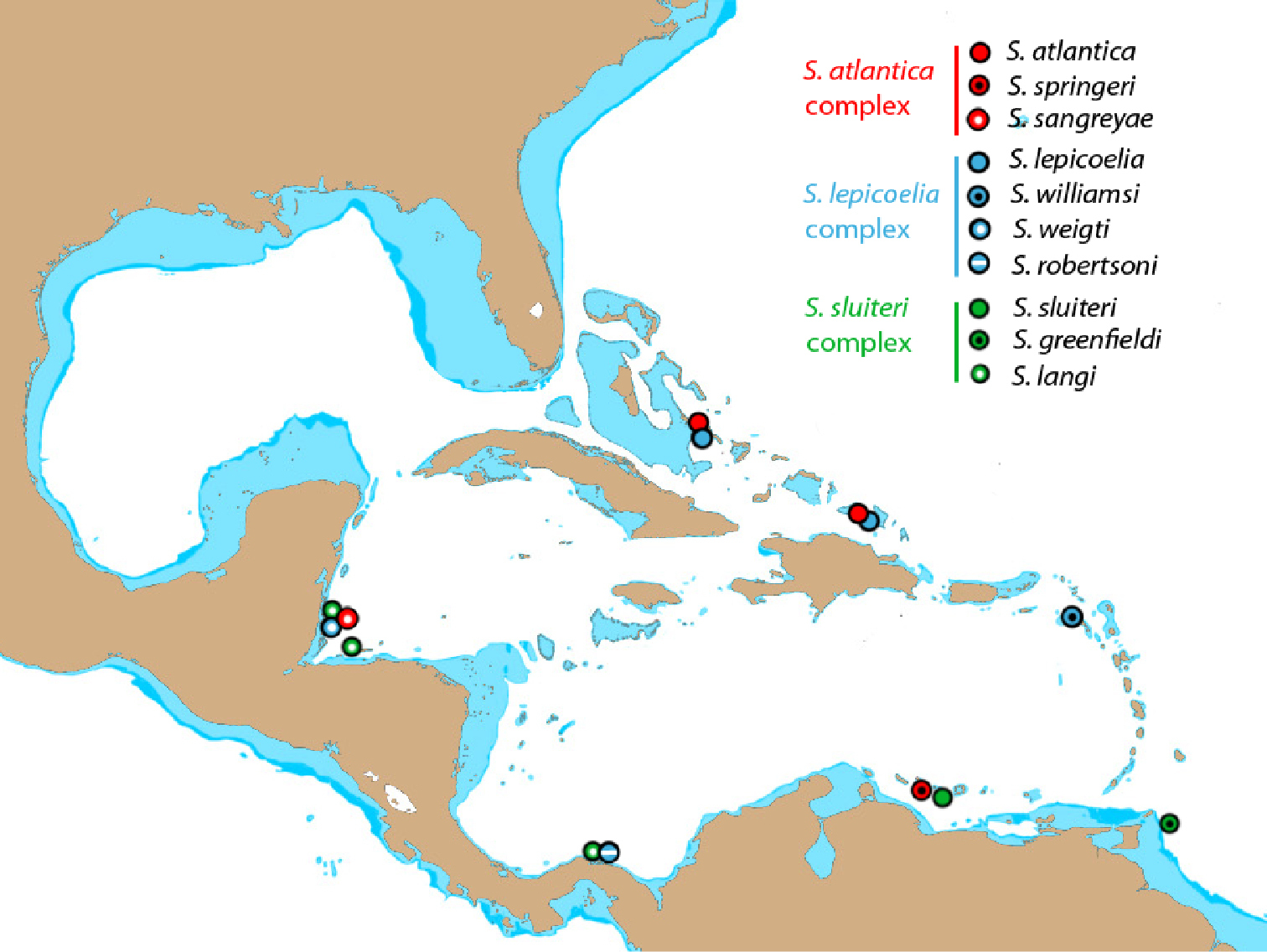
- Distribution of species in the S. atlantica, S. lepicoelia, and S. sluiteri groups. Circles show locations for genetically analyzed specimens.

Synonyms
- Brannerella C. H. Gilbert, 1900; Andracanthus Longley, 1927

= Starksia =

Genus of fishes

Starksia is a genus of labrisomid blennies native to the western Atlantic Ocean and the eastern Pacific Ocean. Their typical length is 2 cm (0.79 in) SL. The generic name honours the American ichthyologist Edwin Chapin Starks (1867-1932) of Stanford University for his work on Pacific coastal fishes. As a genus Starksia is distinguished from other labrisomids by their scaled bodies, two obvious soft rays in the pelvic fin and the male's have an intromittent organ which is near to or attached to the first spine of their anal fins, which is also somewhat separated from the fin.

== Species ==
There are currently 37 recognized species in this genus:

- Starksia atlantica Longley, 1934 (Smooth-eye blenny)
- Starksia brasiliensis (C. H. Gilbert, 1900)
- Starksia cremnobates (C. H. Gilbert, 1890) (Fugitive blenny)
- Starksia culebrae (Evermann & M. C. Marsh, 1899) (Culebra blenny)
- Starksia elongata C. R. Gilbert, 1971 (Elongate blenny)
- Starksia fasciata (Longley, 1934) (Blackbar blenny)
- Starksia fulva Rosenblatt & L. R. Taylor, 1971 (Yellow blenny)
- Starksia galapagensis Rosenblatt & L. R. Taylor, 1971 (Galapagos blenny)
- Starksia grammilaga Rosenblatt & L. R. Taylor, 1971 (Pinstriped blenny)
- Starksia greenfieldi C. C. Baldwin & Castillo, 2011 (Greenfield's blenny)
- Starksia guadalupae Rosenblatt & L. R. Taylor, 1971 (Guadalupe blenny)
- Starksia guttata (Fowler, 1931) (Spotted blenny)
- Starksia hassi Klausewitz, 1958 (Ringed blenny)
- Starksia hoesei Rosenblatt & L. R. Taylor, 1971 (Hose blenny)
- Starksia langi C. C. Baldwin & Castillo, 2011 (Lang's blenny)
- Starksia lepicoelia J. E. Böhlke & V. G. Springer, 1961 (Blackcheek blenny)
- Starksia lepidogaster Rosenblatt & L. R. Taylor, 1971 (Scalybelly blenny)
- Starksia leucovitta J. T. Williams & Mounts, 2003 (Whitesaddle blenny)
- Starksia melasma J. T. Williams & Mounts, 2003 (Black spot blenny)
- Starksia multilepis J. T. Williams & Mounts, 2003 (Manyscaled blenny)
- Starksia nanodes J. E. Böhlke & V. G. Springer, 1961 (Dwarf blenny)
- Starksia occidentalis D. W. Greenfield, 1979 (Occidental blenny)
- Starksia ocellata (Steindachner, 1876) (Checkered blenny)
- Starksia posthon Rosenblatt & L. R. Taylor, 1971 (Brown-spotted blenny)
- Starksia rava J. T. Williams & Mounts, 2003 (Tawny blenny)
- Starksia robertsoni C. C. Baldwin, Victor & Castillo, 2011 (Robertson's blenny)
- Starksia sangreyae Castillo & C. C. Baldwin, 2011 (Sangrey's blenny)
- Starksia sella J. T. Williams & Mounts, 2003 (Darksaddle blenny)
- Starksia sluiteri (Metzelaar, 1919) (Chessboard blenny)
- Starksia smithvanizi J. T. Williams & Mounts, 2003 (Brokenbar blenny)
- Starksia spinipenis (Al-Uthman, 1960) (Phallic blenny)
- Starksia splendens Victor, 2018 (Splendid shy blenny)
- Starksia springeri Castillo & C. C. Baldwin, 2011 (Springer's blenny)
- Starksia starcki C. R. Gilbert, 1971 (Key blenny)
- Starksia variabilis D. W. Greenfield, 1979 (Variable blenny)
- Starksia weigti C. C. Baldwin & Castillo, 2011 (Weigt's blenny)
- Starksia williamsi C. C. Baldwin & Castillo, 2011 (Williams's blenny)
- Starksia y-lineata C. R. Gilbert, 1965 (Forked bar blenny)
