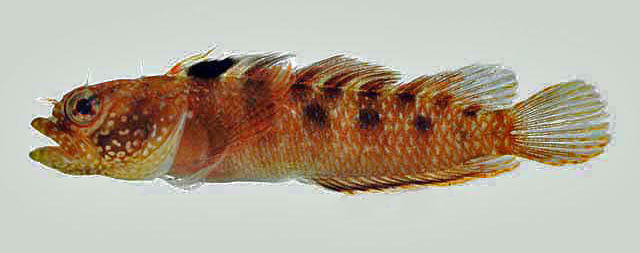

Conservation status
- Least Concern (IUCN 3.1)

Scientific classification
- Kingdom: Animalia
- Phylum: Chordata
- Class: Actinopterygii
- Order: Blenniiformes
- Family: Labrisomidae
- Genus: Starksia
- Species: S. melasma

Binomial name
- Starksia melasma J. T. Williams & Mounts, 2003
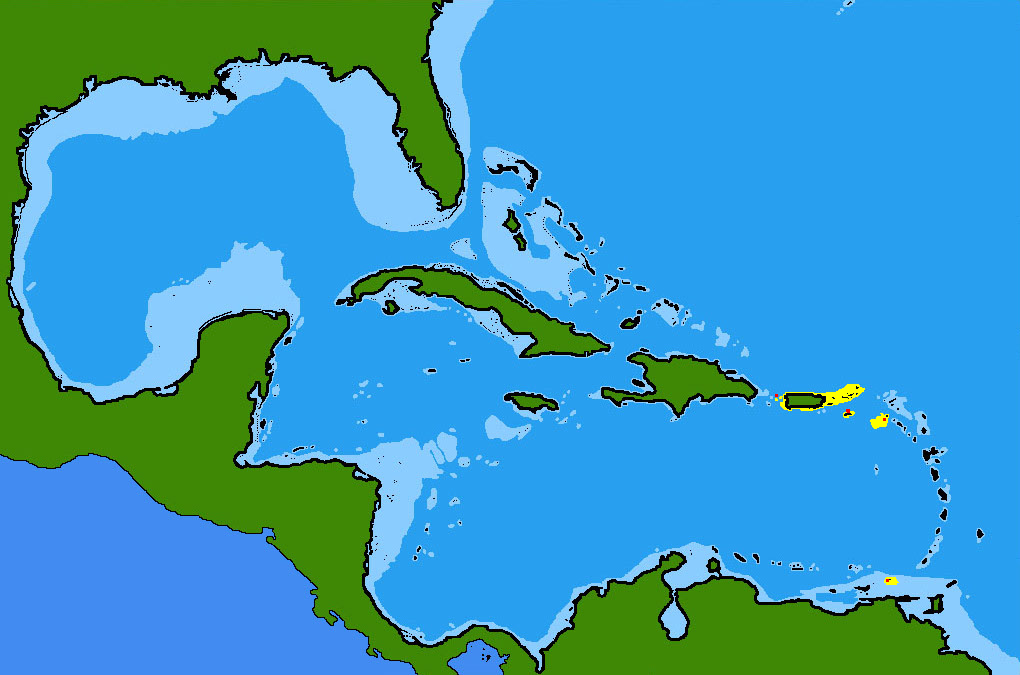

= Starksia melasma =

Species of fish

Starksia melasma, the black spot blenny, is a species of labrisomid blenny known only from reefs around Desecheo Island, Puerto Rico and St. Croix, U.S. Virgin Islands. This species can reach a length of 2.1 cm (0.83 in).
