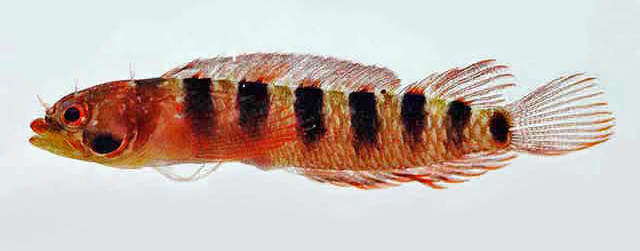
- Male

Conservation status
- Least Concern (IUCN 3.1)

Scientific classification
- Kingdom: Animalia
- Phylum: Chordata
- Class: Actinopterygii
- Order: Blenniiformes
- Family: Labrisomidae
- Genus: Starksia
- Species: S. fasciata

Binomial name
- Starksia fasciata (Longley, 1934)
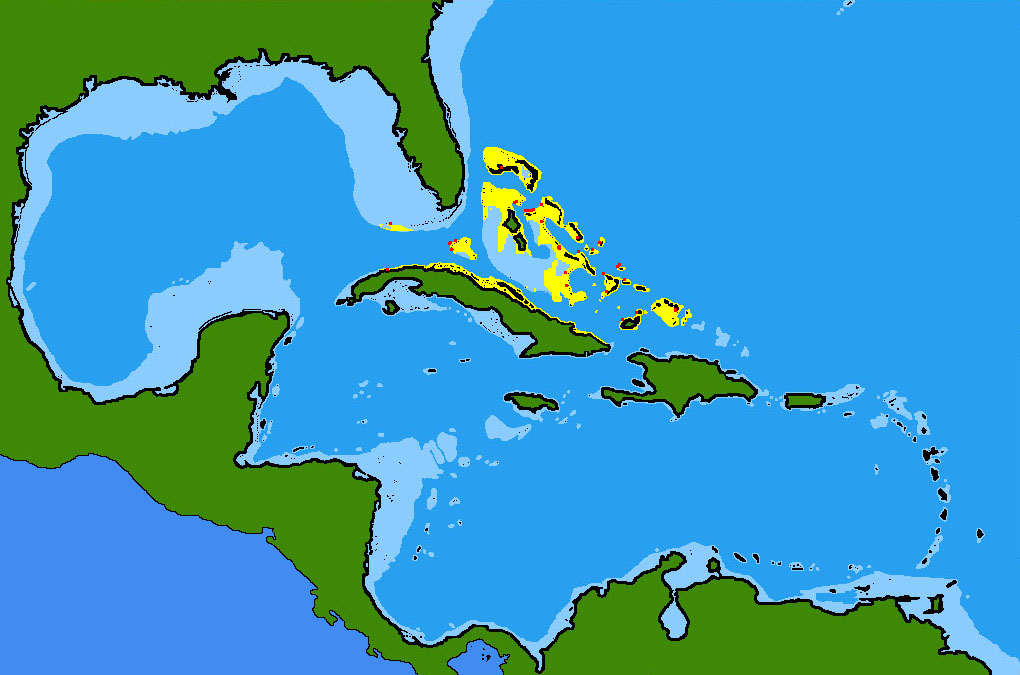

Synonyms
- Brannerella fasciata Longley, 1934

= Starksia fasciata =

Species of fish

Starksia fasciata, the blackbar blenny, is a fish species of labrisomid blenny so far known only from around the Bahamas and Cuba. It inhabits shallow, rocky areas at depths of from 6 to 7 meters (20 to 23 ft). This species can reach a length of 2.7 centimetres (1.1 in) SL.
