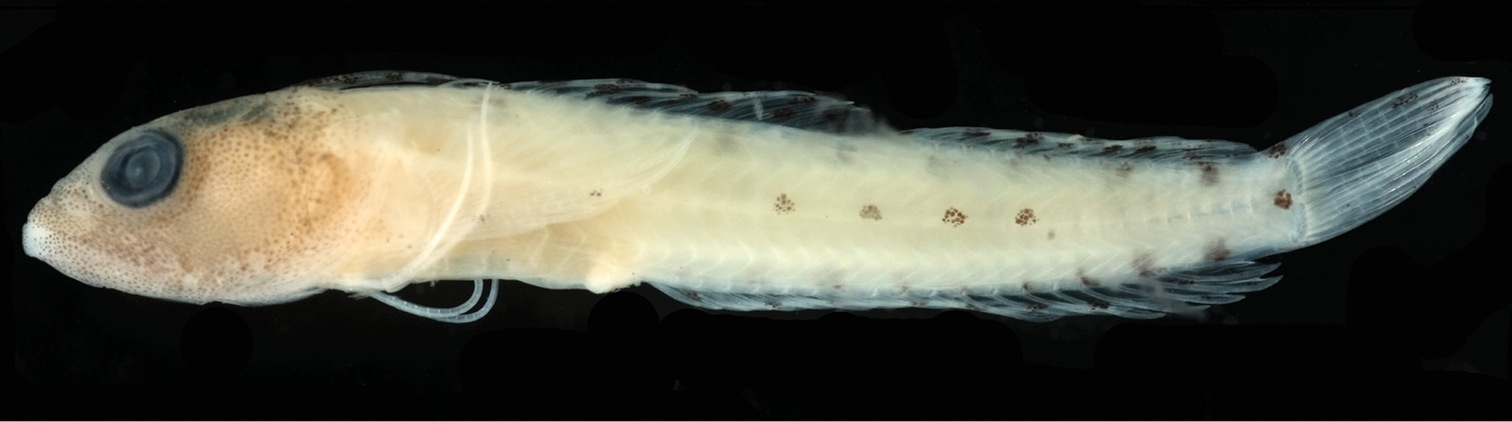
- Four-fin Blenny (H. dropi), (holotype)

Scientific classification
- Kingdom: Animalia
- Phylum: Chordata
- Class: Actinopterygii
- Order: Blenniiformes
- Family: Labrisomidae
- Genus: Haptoclinus; J. E. Böhlke & C. R. Robins, 1974

Type species
- Haptoclinus apectolophus J. E. Böhlke & C. R. Robins, 1974

= Haptoclinus =

Genus of fishes

Haptoclinus is a genus of labrisomid blennies native to the Caribbean Sea.

== Species ==
There are currently two recognized species in this genus:

- Haptoclinus apectolophus J. E. Böhlke & C. R. Robins, 1974 (Uncombed blenny)
- Haptoclinus dropi C. C. Baldwin & D. R. Robertson, 2013 (Four-fin blenny)
