= Starksia y-lineata =

Conservation status
- Data Deficient (IUCN 3.1)

Scientific classification
- Kingdom: Animalia
- Phylum: Chordata
- Class: Actinopterygii
- Order: Blenniiformes
- Family: Labrisomidae
- Genus: Starksia
- Species: S. y-lineata

Binomial name
- Starksia y-lineata C. R. Gilbert, 1965
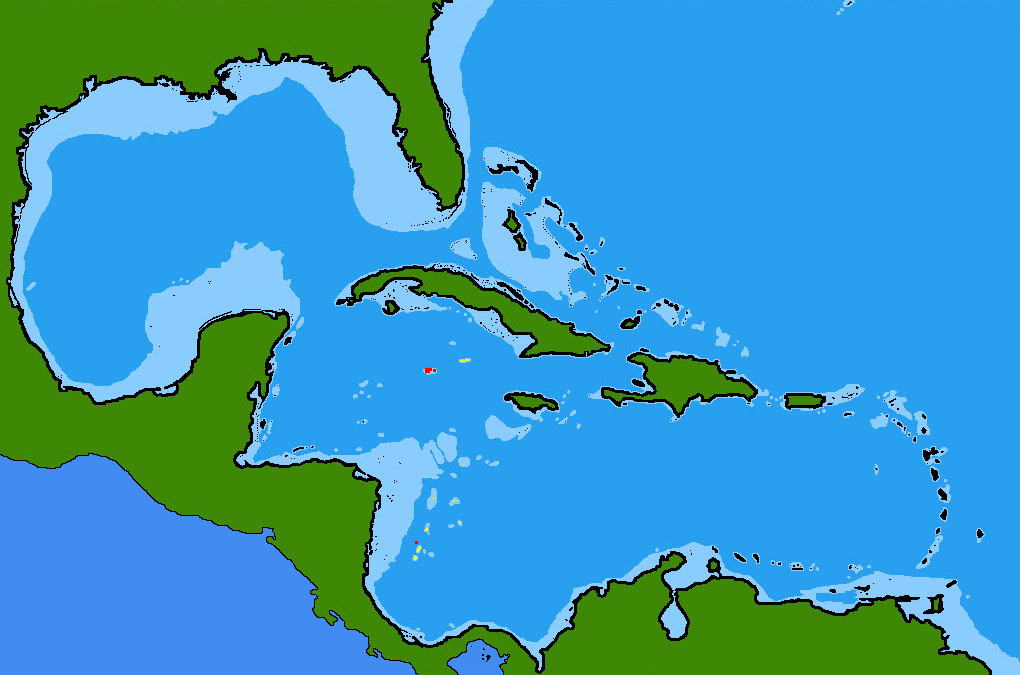

Species of fish

Starksia y-lineata, the forked bar blenny, is a species of labrisomid blenny native to reef environments of the Caribbean Sea. This species can reach a length of 1.9 cm (0.75 in) SL.
