= Dialommus fuscus =

Conservation status
- Vulnerable (IUCN 3.1)

Scientific classification
- Kingdom: Animalia
- Phylum: Chordata
- Class: Actinopterygii
- Order: Blenniiformes
- Family: Labrisomidae
- Genus: Dialommus
- Species: D. fuscus

Binomial name
- Dialommus fuscus C. H. Gilbert, 1891

Species of fish

Dialommus fuscus, the Galápagos four-eyed blenny, is a species of labrisomid blenny endemic to the coasts of the Galapagos Islands. It inhabits the intertidal zone where it lives in tide pools as well as traveling on land. Special adaptations of the corneas of the eye and the gill filaments allow this species to travel up to 30 metres (98 ft) from the ocean in search of prey items such as insects and shore-dwelling crabs.
