= Calliclinus nudiventris =

Conservation status
- Least Concern (IUCN 3.1)

Scientific classification
- Kingdom: Animalia
- Phylum: Chordata
- Class: Actinopterygii
- Order: Blenniiformes
- Family: Labrisomidae
- Genus: Calliclinus
- Species: C. nudiventris

Binomial name
- Calliclinus nudiventris Cervigón & Pequeño, 1979

Species of fish

Calliclinus nudiventris is a species of labrisomid blenny endemic to the Pacific coast of Chile.
