= Starksia multilepis =

Conservation status
- Least Concern (IUCN 3.1)

Scientific classification
- Kingdom: Animalia
- Phylum: Chordata
- Class: Actinopterygii
- Order: Blenniiformes
- Family: Labrisomidae
- Genus: Starksia
- Species: S. multilepis

Binomial name
- Starksia multilepis J. T. Williams & Mounts, 2003

Species of fish

Starksia multilepis, the manyscaled blenny, is a species of labrisomid blenny only known from reefs of the Atol das Rocas and Fernando de Noronha Island off the coast of Brazil where it is found at depths of about 1 m (3.3 ft). This species can reach a length of 2.2 cm (0.87 in) SL.
