= Starksia variabilis =

Conservation status
- Data Deficient (IUCN 3.1)

Scientific classification
- Kingdom: Animalia
- Phylum: Chordata
- Class: Actinopterygii
- Order: Blenniiformes
- Family: Labrisomidae
- Genus: Starksia
- Species: S. variabilis

Binomial name
- Starksia variabilis D. W. Greenfield, 1979

Species of fish

Starksia variabilis is a species of labrisomid blenny known only from the Caribbean coast of Colombia where it is known to occur of reefs at a depth of about 1 metre (3.3 ft).
