= Starksia splendens =

Scientific classification
- Domain: Eukaryota
- Kingdom: Animalia
- Phylum: Chordata
- Class: Actinopterygii
- Order: Blenniiformes
- Family: Labrisomidae
- Genus: Starksia
- Species: S. splendens

Binomial name
- Starksia splendens Victor, 2018

Species of fish

Starksia splendens, the splendid shy blenny, is a species of labrisomid blenny which was described in 2018 from the Cayman Islands. It is one of the blackcheek shy blennies, in the Starksia lepicoelia species complex. This species complex is made up of a number of allopatric cryptic species in the Caribbean which are best separated using mtDNA and the extensive use of underwater photographs.
