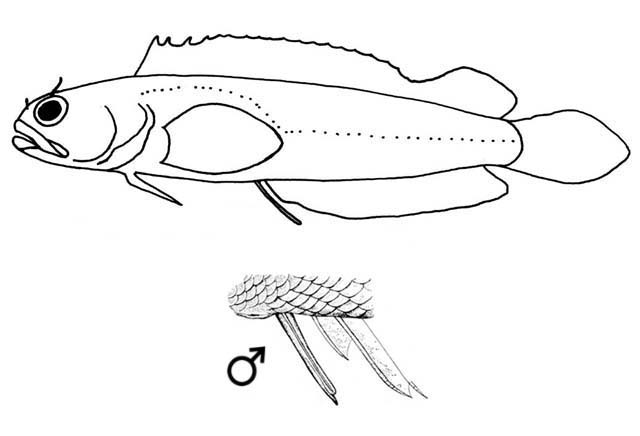

Conservation status
- Least Concern (IUCN 3.1)

Scientific classification
- Kingdom: Animalia
- Phylum: Chordata
- Class: Actinopterygii
- Order: Blenniiformes
- Family: Labrisomidae
- Genus: Starksia
- Species: S. grammilaga

Binomial name
- Starksia grammilaga Rosenblatt & L. R. Taylor, 1971
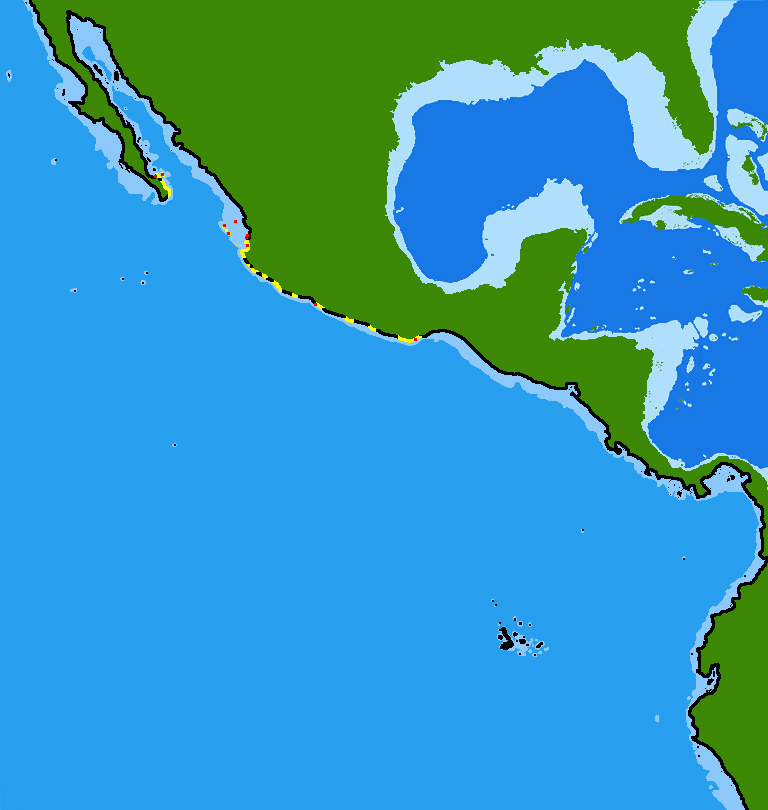

= Starksia grammilaga =

Species of fish

Starksia grammilaga, the pinstriped blenny, is a species of labrisomid blenny native to the Pacific coast of Mexico including the Gulf of California.
