= Cryptotrema seftoni =

Conservation status
- Data Deficient (IUCN 3.1)

Scientific classification
- Kingdom: Animalia
- Phylum: Chordata
- Class: Actinopterygii
- Order: Blenniiformes
- Family: Labrisomidae
- Genus: Cryptotrema
- Species: C. seftoni

Binomial name
- Cryptotrema seftoni C. Hubbs, 1954

Species of fish

Cryptotrema seftoni, the Hidden blenny, is a species of labrisomid blenny known only from Angel de la Guarda Island, in the Gulf of California This species is a deep water species known to occur on rocky reefs at depths greater than 28 metres (90 ft). No specimens of this fish have been collected since 1952 and it is poorly known. The specific name honours Joseph W. Sefton Jr. (1882–1966), a banker from San Diego, California, from whose yacht the type was dredged.
