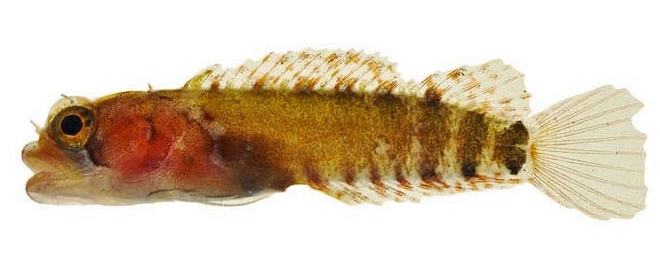

Conservation status
- Least Concern (IUCN 3.1)

Scientific classification
- Kingdom: Animalia
- Phylum: Chordata
- Class: Actinopterygii
- Order: Blenniiformes
- Family: Labrisomidae
- Genus: Starksia
- Species: S. nanodes

Binomial name
- Starksia nanodes J. E. Böhlke & V. G. Springer, 1961
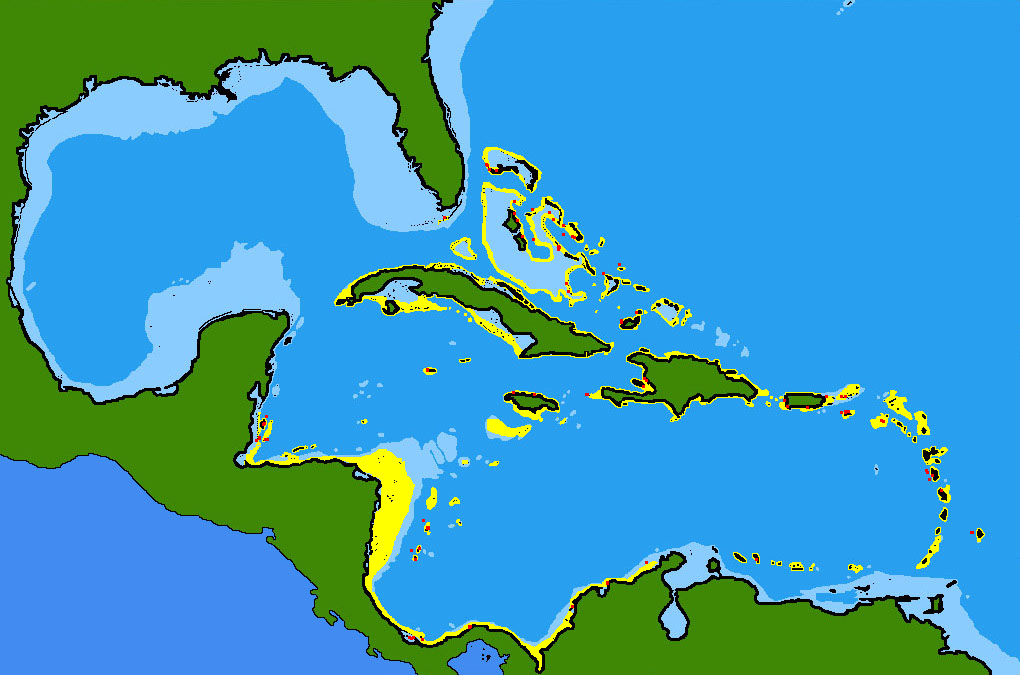

= Starksia nanodes =

Species of fish

Starksia nanodes, the dwarf blenny, is a species of labrisomid blenny native to coral reefs of the Caribbean Sea and the adjacent Atlantic Ocean. This species can reach a length of 2.2 cm (0.87 in) SL.
