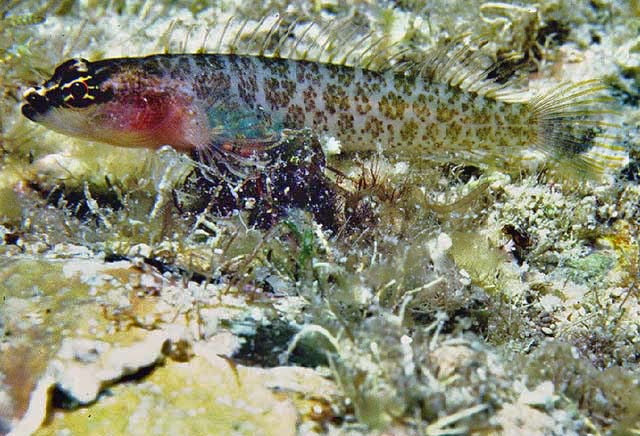

Conservation status
- Least Concern (IUCN 3.1)

Scientific classification
- Kingdom: Animalia
- Phylum: Chordata
- Class: Actinopterygii
- Order: Blenniiformes
- Family: Labrisomidae
- Genus: Starksia
- Species: S. spinipenis

Binomial name
- Starksia spinipenis (Al-Uthman, 1960)
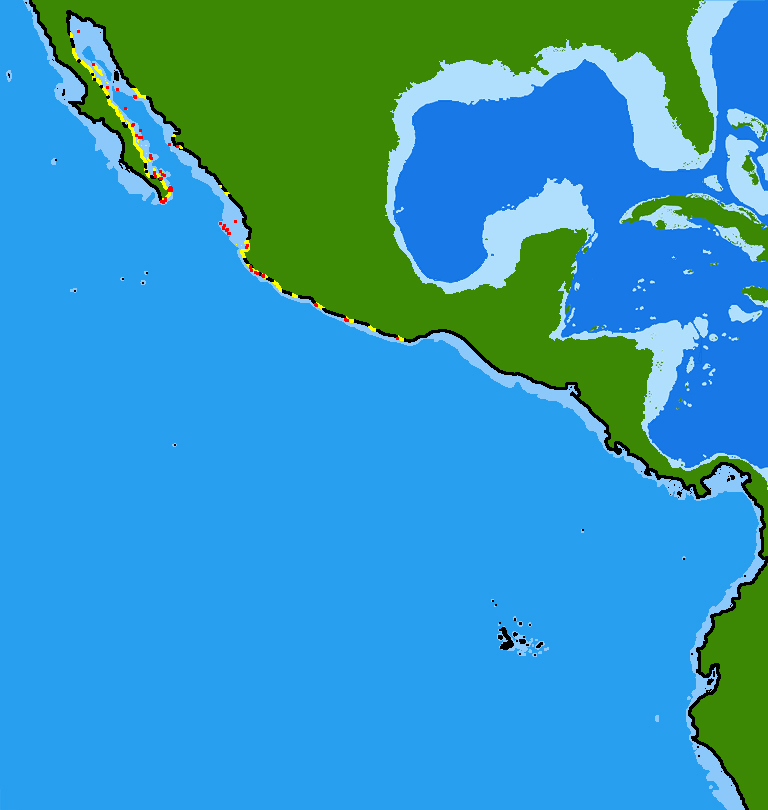

Synonyms
- Brannerella spinipenis Al-Uthman, 1960

= Starksia spinipenis =

Species of fish

Starksia spinipenis, the phallic blenny, is a species of labrisomid blenny native to the Pacific coast of Mexico from the Gulf of California to Acapulco. It prefers shallow sandy areas with weed growth. This species can reach a length of 5 centimetres (2.0 in) TL. The specific name is a compound noun if spinis meaning "spine" and penis, a reference to the first spine in the anal fin of the males which is elongated and free of the fin membrane and is modified as a copulatory organ, a characteristic of the genus Starksia.
