= Cryptotrema corallinum =

Conservation status
- Least Concern (IUCN 3.1)

Scientific classification
- Kingdom: Animalia
- Phylum: Chordata
- Class: Actinopterygii
- Order: Blenniiformes
- Family: Labrisomidae
- Genus: Cryptotrema
- Species: C. corallinum

Binomial name
- Cryptotrema corallinum C. H. Gilbert, 1890

Species of fish

Cryptotrema corallinum, the deep-water blenny, is a species of labrisomid blenny native to the eastern Pacific Ocean where it is known to occur from Santa Cruz Island, California to Baja California, Mexico. It lives in areas with rocky substrates at depths of from 24 to 91 metres (79 to 299 ft). This species can reach a length of 13 centimetres (5.1 in) TL.
