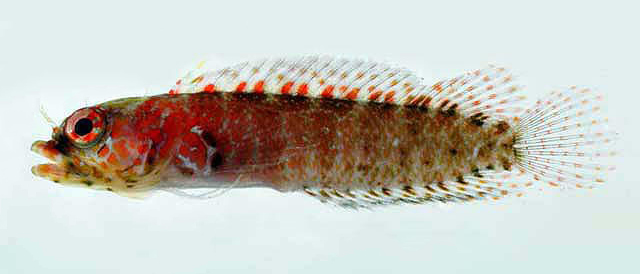

Conservation status
- Least Concern (IUCN 3.1)

Scientific classification
- Kingdom: Animalia
- Phylum: Chordata
- Class: Actinopterygii
- Order: Blenniiformes
- Family: Labrisomidae
- Genus: Starksia
- Species: S. rava

Binomial name
- Starksia rava J. T. Williams & Mounts, 2003
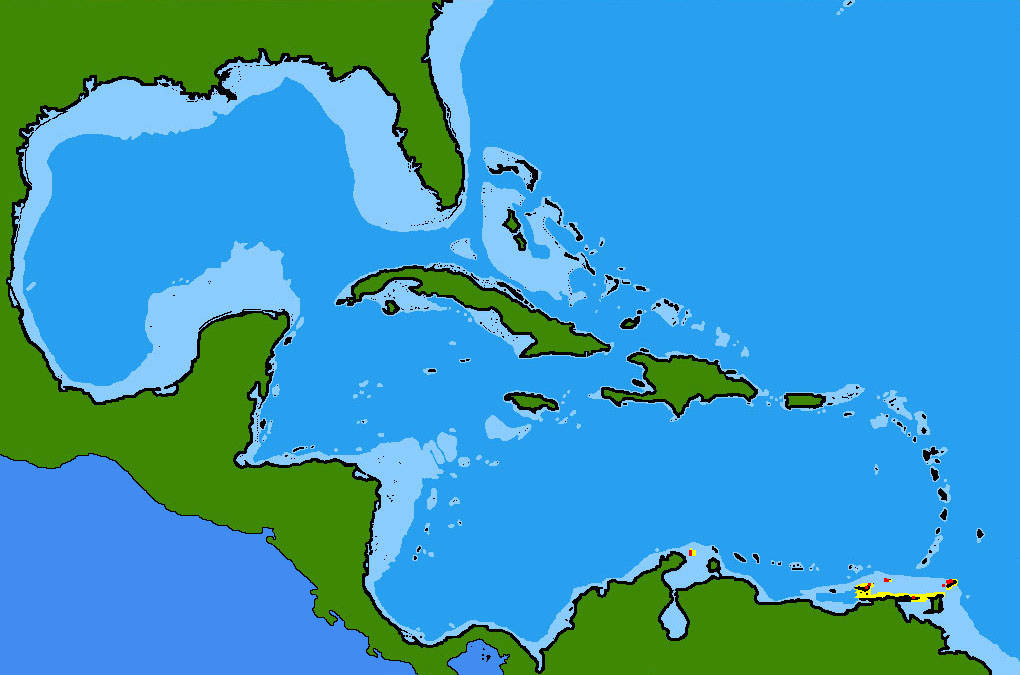

= Starksia rava =

Species of fish

Starksia rava, the tawny blenny, is a species of labrisomid blenny endemic to the waters around the island of Tobago. It is found inhabiting reefs at depths of from 6 to 11 metres (20 to 36 ft). This species can reach a length of 2.5 centimetres (0.98 in) SL.
