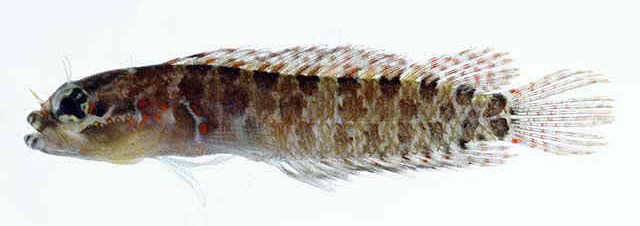

Conservation status
- Least Concern (IUCN 3.1)

Scientific classification
- Kingdom: Animalia
- Phylum: Chordata
- Class: Actinopterygii
- Order: Blenniiformes
- Family: Labrisomidae
- Genus: Starksia
- Species: S. occidentalis

Binomial name
- Starksia occidentalis D. W. Greenfield, 1979
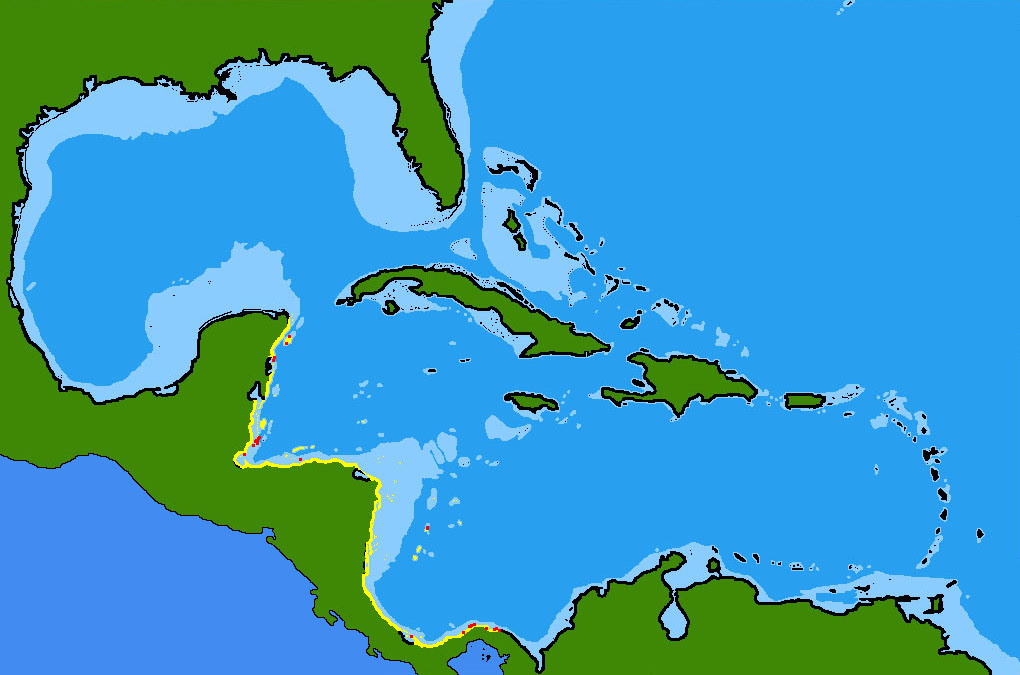

= Starksia occidentalis =

Species of fish

Starksia occidentalis, the occidental blenny, is a species of labrisomid blenny native to reefs of the western Caribbean Sea where it occurs at depths of around 1 m (3.3 ft).
