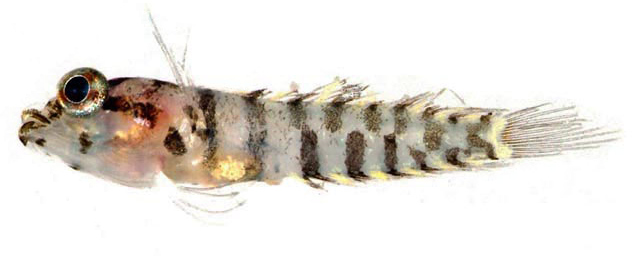

Conservation status
- Least Concern (IUCN 3.1)

Scientific classification
- Kingdom: Animalia
- Phylum: Chordata
- Class: Actinopterygii
- Order: Blenniiformes
- Family: Labrisomidae
- Genus: Starksia
- Species: S. starcki

Binomial name
- Starksia starcki C. R. Gilbert, 1971
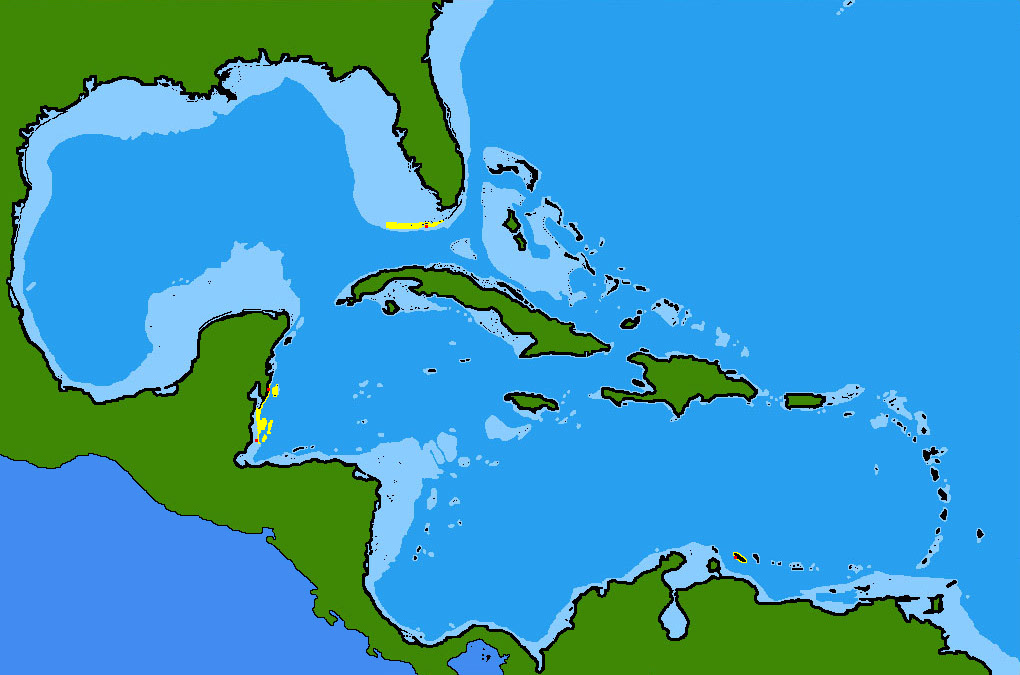

= Starksia starcki =

Species of fish

Starksia starcki, the key blenny, is a species of labrisomid blenny native to the Caribbean Sea. It inhabits coral reefs, preferring surge channels at depths of from 6 to 19 m (20 to 62 ft). This species can reach a length of 4 cm (1.6 in) TL. It is also found in the aquarium trade. The specific name honours the Walter A Starck II in recognition of his contributions to marine biology.
