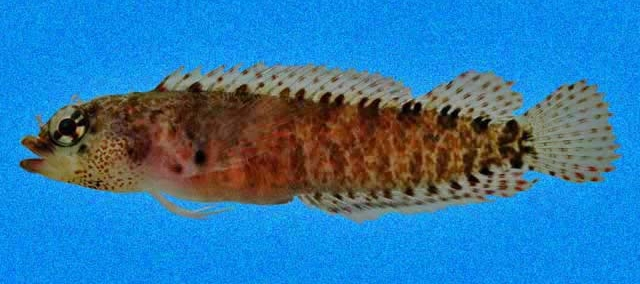

Conservation status
- Least Concern (IUCN 3.1)

Scientific classification
- Kingdom: Animalia
- Phylum: Chordata
- Class: Actinopterygii
- Order: Blenniiformes
- Family: Labrisomidae
- Genus: Starksia
- Species: S. fulva

Binomial name
- Starksia fulva Rosenblatt & L. R. Taylor, 1971
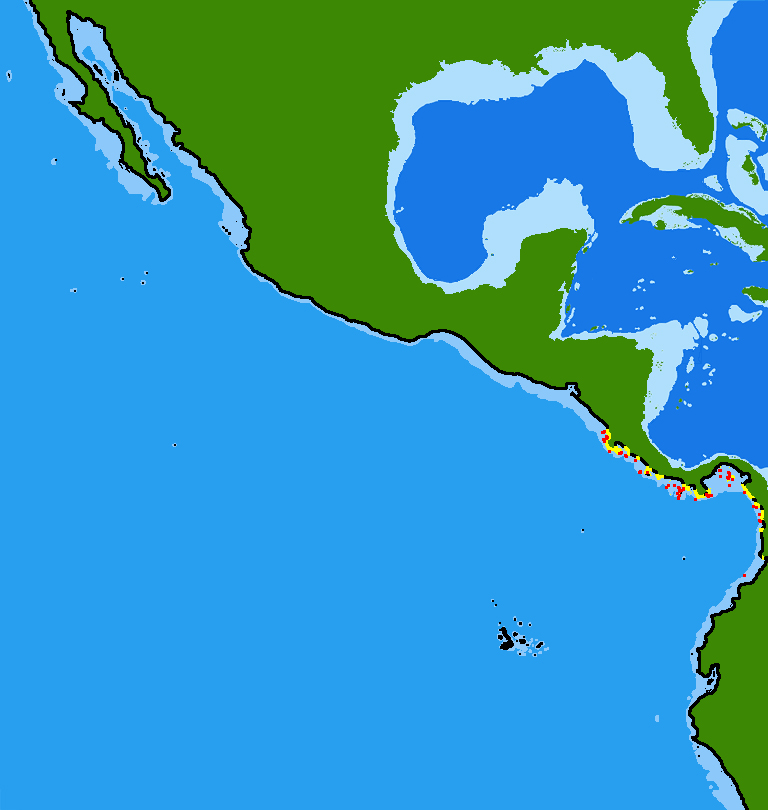

= Starksia fulva =

Species of fish

Starksia fulva, known commonly as the yellow blenny, is a species of labrisomid blenny native to the Pacific coast of the Americas from Costa Rica to Ecuador. It is found in shallow weedy or sandy habitats at depths of from 1 to 3 m (3.3 to 9.8 ft). This species can reach a length of 4.5 cm (1.8 in) TL.
