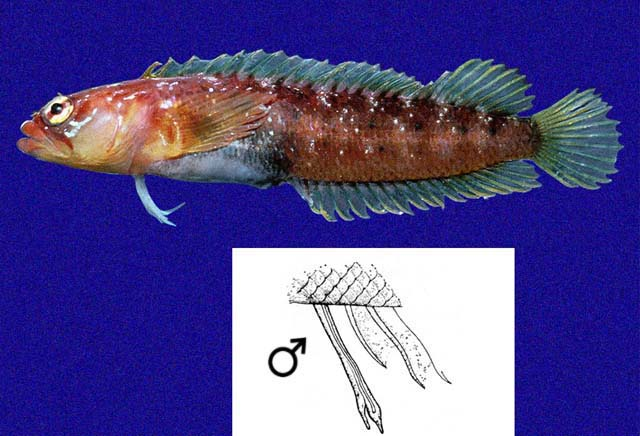

Conservation status
- Vulnerable (IUCN 3.1)

Scientific classification
- Kingdom: Animalia
- Phylum: Chordata
- Class: Actinopterygii
- Order: Blenniiformes
- Family: Labrisomidae
- Genus: Starksia
- Species: S. galapagensis

Binomial name
- Starksia galapagensis Rosenblatt & L. R. Taylor, 1971
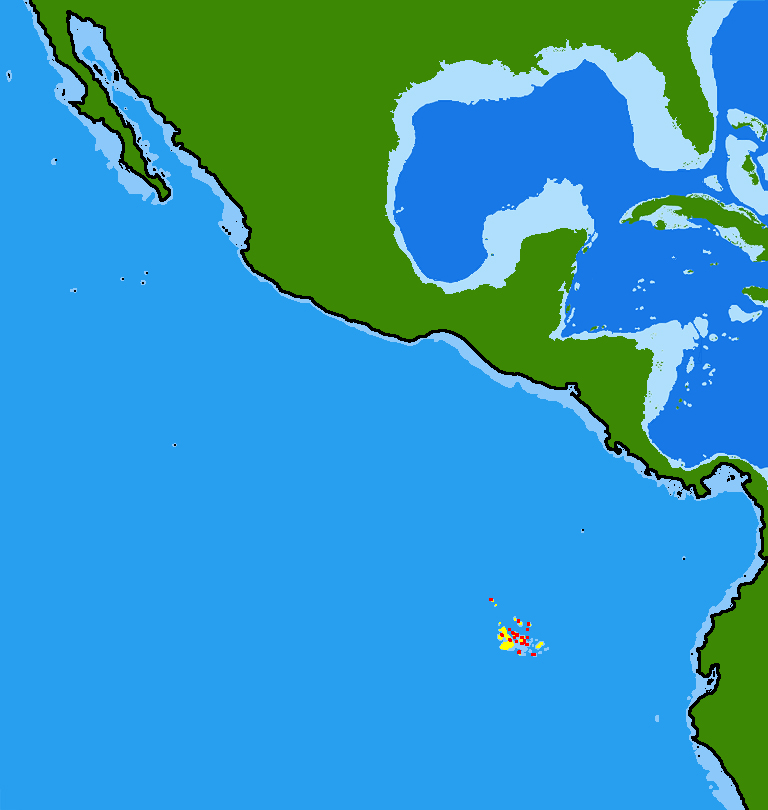

= Starksia galapagensis =

Species of fish

Starksia galapagensis, the Galapagos blenny, is a species of labrisomid blenny endemic to the Galapagos Islands. It inhabits rocky reefs with plentiful weed-growth at depths of from 3 to 25 m (9.8 to 82.0 ft). This species can reach a length of 4.5 cm (1.8 in) TL.
