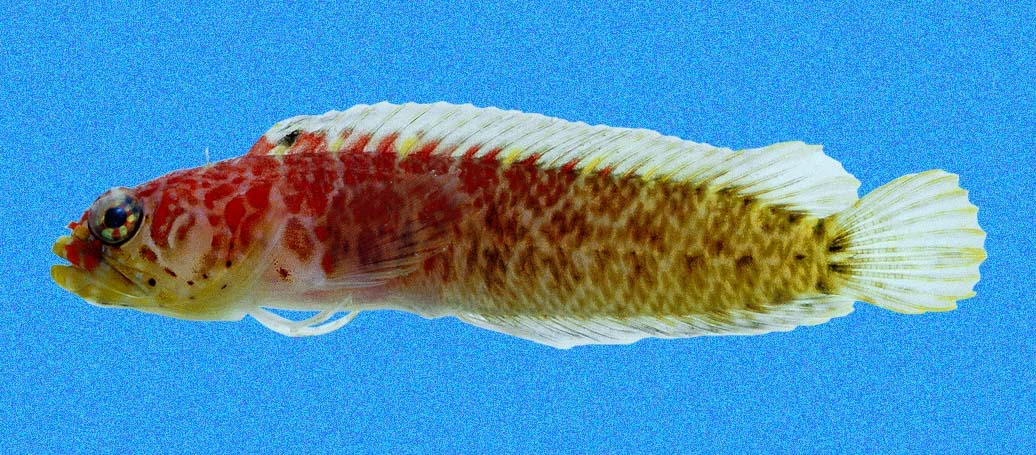

Conservation status
- Data Deficient (IUCN 3.1)

Scientific classification
- Kingdom: Animalia
- Phylum: Chordata
- Class: Actinopterygii
- Order: Blenniiformes
- Family: Labrisomidae
- Genus: Starksia
- Species: S. posthon

Binomial name
- Starksia posthon Rosenblatt & L. R. Taylor, 1971
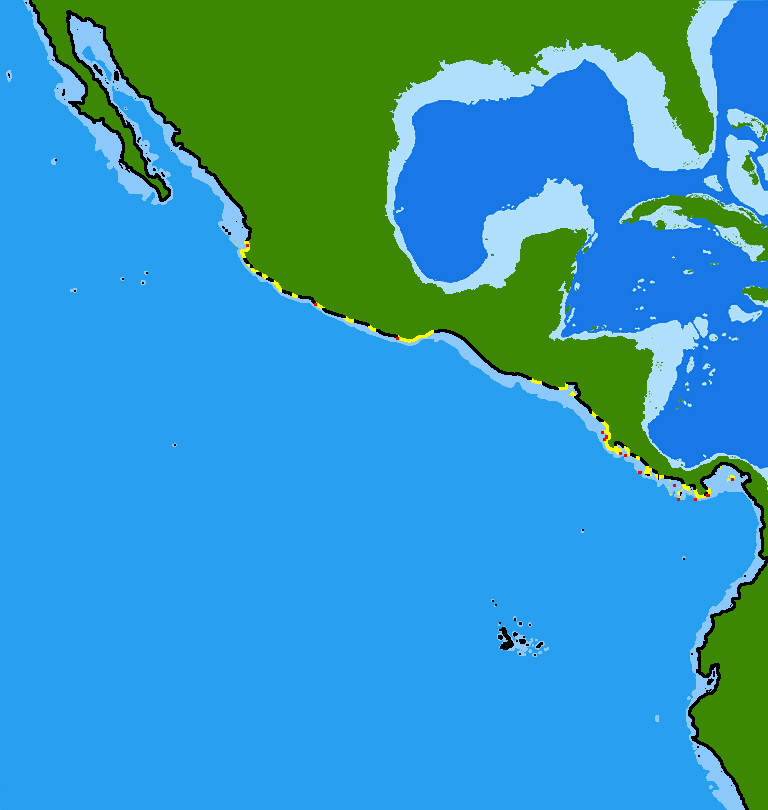

= Starksia posthon =

Species of fish

Starksia posthon, the brown-spotted blenny, is a species of labrisomid blenny native to the Pacific coast of Central America from Costa Rica to Panama. It inhabits sandy areas with weed growth in shallow waters. This species can reach a length of 4 cm (1.6 in) TL.
