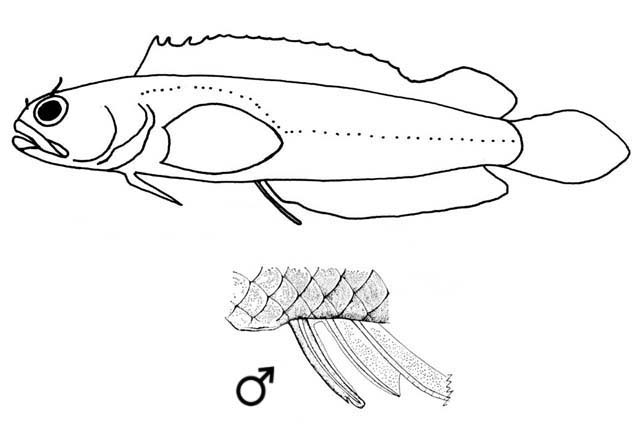

Conservation status
- Data Deficient (IUCN 3.1)

Scientific classification
- Kingdom: Animalia
- Phylum: Chordata
- Class: Actinopterygii
- Order: Blenniiformes
- Family: Labrisomidae
- Genus: Starksia
- Species: S. lepidogaster

Binomial name
- Starksia lepidogaster Rosenblatt & L. R. Taylor, 1971
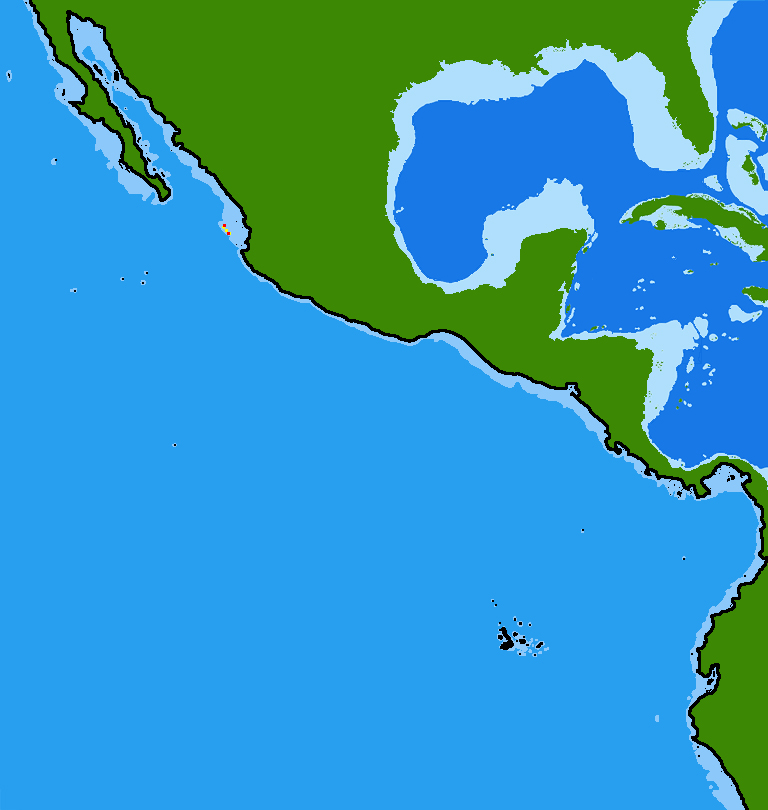

= Starksia lepidogaster =

Species of fish

Starksia lepidogaster, the scalybelly blenny, is a species of labrisomid blenny endemic to the Tres Marias Islands off the Pacific coast of Mexico. It can be found from very shallow waters to a depth of 13 m (43 ft).
