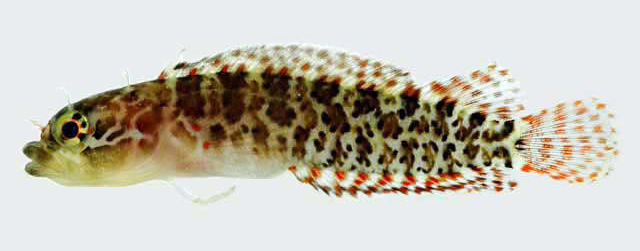

Conservation status
- Least Concern (IUCN 3.1)

Scientific classification
- Kingdom: Animalia
- Phylum: Chordata
- Class: Actinopterygii
- Order: Blenniiformes
- Family: Labrisomidae
- Genus: Starksia
- Species: S. guttata

Binomial name
- Starksia guttata (Fowler, 1931)
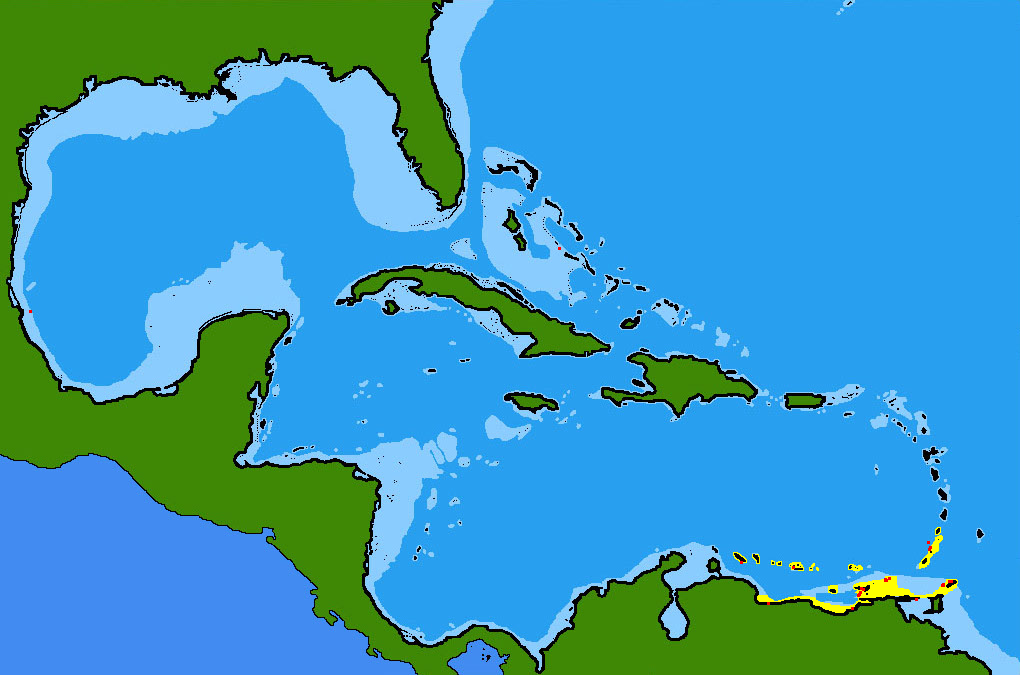

Synonyms
- Brannerella guttata Fowler, 1931

= Starksia guttata =

Species of fish

Starksia guttata, the spotted blenny, is a species of labrisomid blenny native to the Caribbean Sea and the Atlantic Ocean from the Grenadines to Curaçao and Trinidad. This species is a reef inhabitant. It can reach a length of 4.6 cm (1.8 in) SL.
