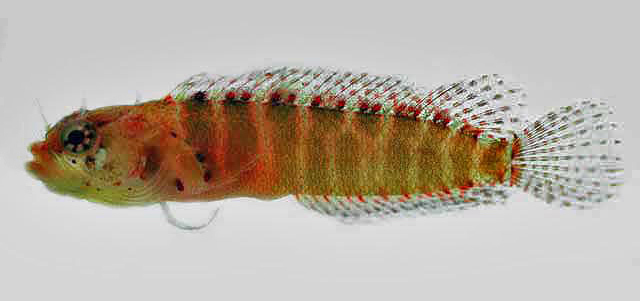

Conservation status
- Least Concern (IUCN 3.1)

Scientific classification
- Kingdom: Animalia
- Phylum: Chordata
- Class: Actinopterygii
- Order: Blenniiformes
- Family: Labrisomidae
- Genus: Starksia
- Species: S. hassi

Binomial name
- Starksia hassi Klausewitz, 1958
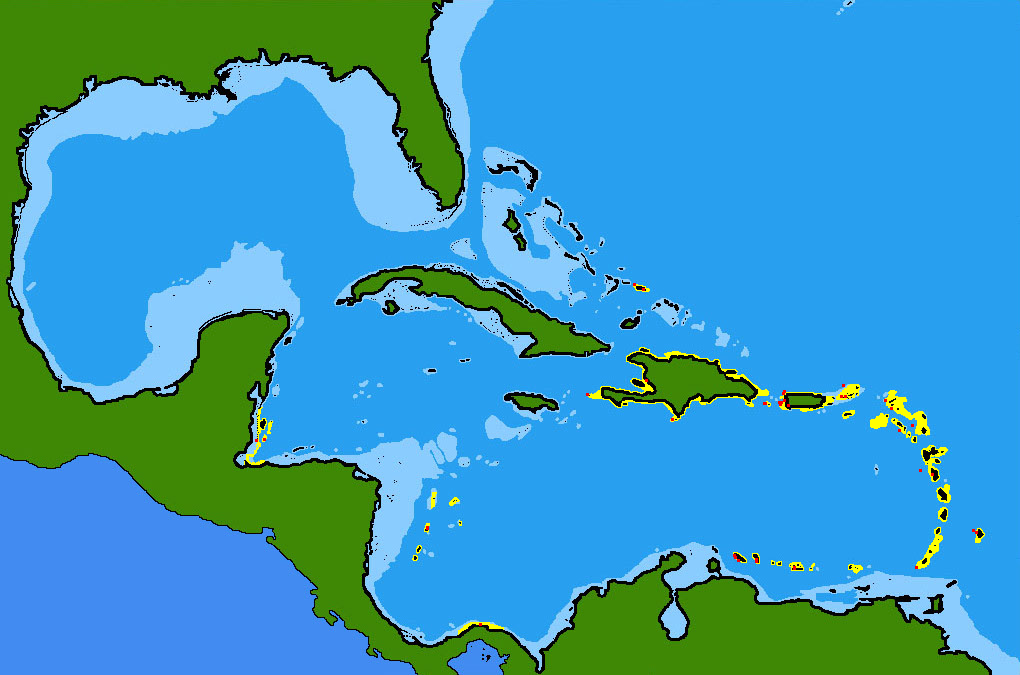

= Starksia hassi =

Species of fish

Starksia hassi, the ringed blenny, is a species of labrisomid blenny native to the Caribbean Sea and the Atlantic Ocean. It is and inhabitant of coral reefs and can be found at depths of from 6 to 175 m (20 to 574 ft). This species can reach a length of 4 cm (1.6 in) TL.

Starksia hassi can easily move within and below an sea anemone without being stung by its tentacles, and uses this property for self-defense. It normally rests within the anemone, and hides further into its tentacles when approached.

The specific name honours the Austrian biologist and underwater diving pioneer Hans Hass (1919–2013) who was the leader of the expedition on which the type of this species was collected.
