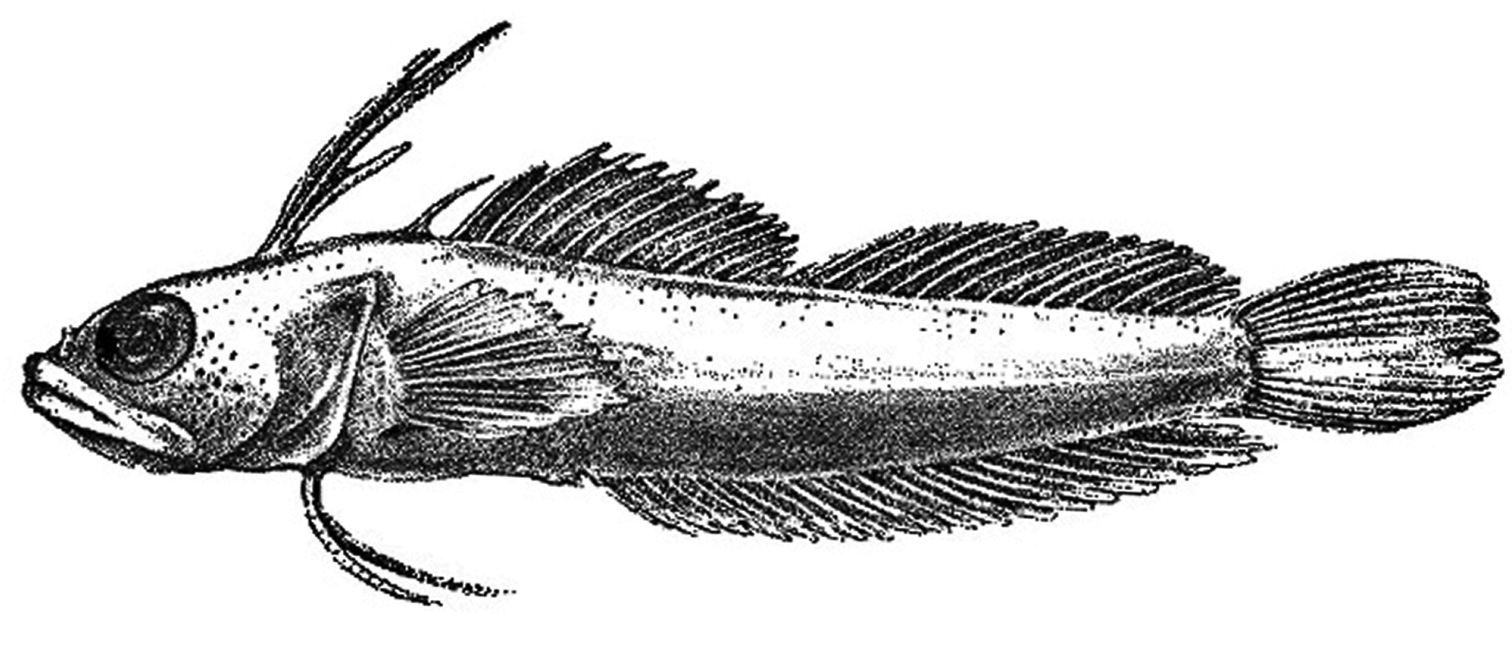

Conservation status
- Data Deficient (IUCN 3.1)

Scientific classification
- Kingdom: Animalia
- Phylum: Chordata
- Class: Actinopterygii
- Order: Blenniiformes
- Family: Labrisomidae
- Genus: Haptoclinus
- Species: H. apectolophus

Binomial name
- Haptoclinus apectolophus J. E. Böhlke & C. R. Robins, 1974

= Haptoclinus apectolophus =

Species of fish

Haptoclinus apectolophus, the Uncombed blenny, is a species of labrisomid blenny known only from Arrowsmith Bank off of the Yucatan Peninsula. This species is only known to occur in deep waters at depths of from 339 to 366 metres (1,112 to 1,201 ft).
