= Calliclinus geniguttatus =

Conservation status
- Least Concern (IUCN 3.1)

Scientific classification
- Kingdom: Animalia
- Phylum: Chordata
- Class: Actinopterygii
- Order: Blenniiformes
- Family: Labrisomidae
- Genus: Calliclinus
- Species: C. geniguttatus

Binomial name
- Calliclinus geniguttatus (Valenciennes, 1836)

Synonyms
- Clinus elegans Valenciennes, 1836; Clinus geniguttatus Valenciennes, 1836; Clinus guttulatus Valenciennes, 1836; Labrisomus coventryi Fowler, 1940; Pennaclinus racemarius de Buen, 1962

Species of fish

Calliclinus geniguttatus is a species of labrisomid blenny native to the Pacific coast of Chile and the Atlantic coast of Argentina. This species primarily preys on amphipods when young, shifting to decapods as they mature. It can reach a length of 12.2 centimetres (4.8 in) TL.
