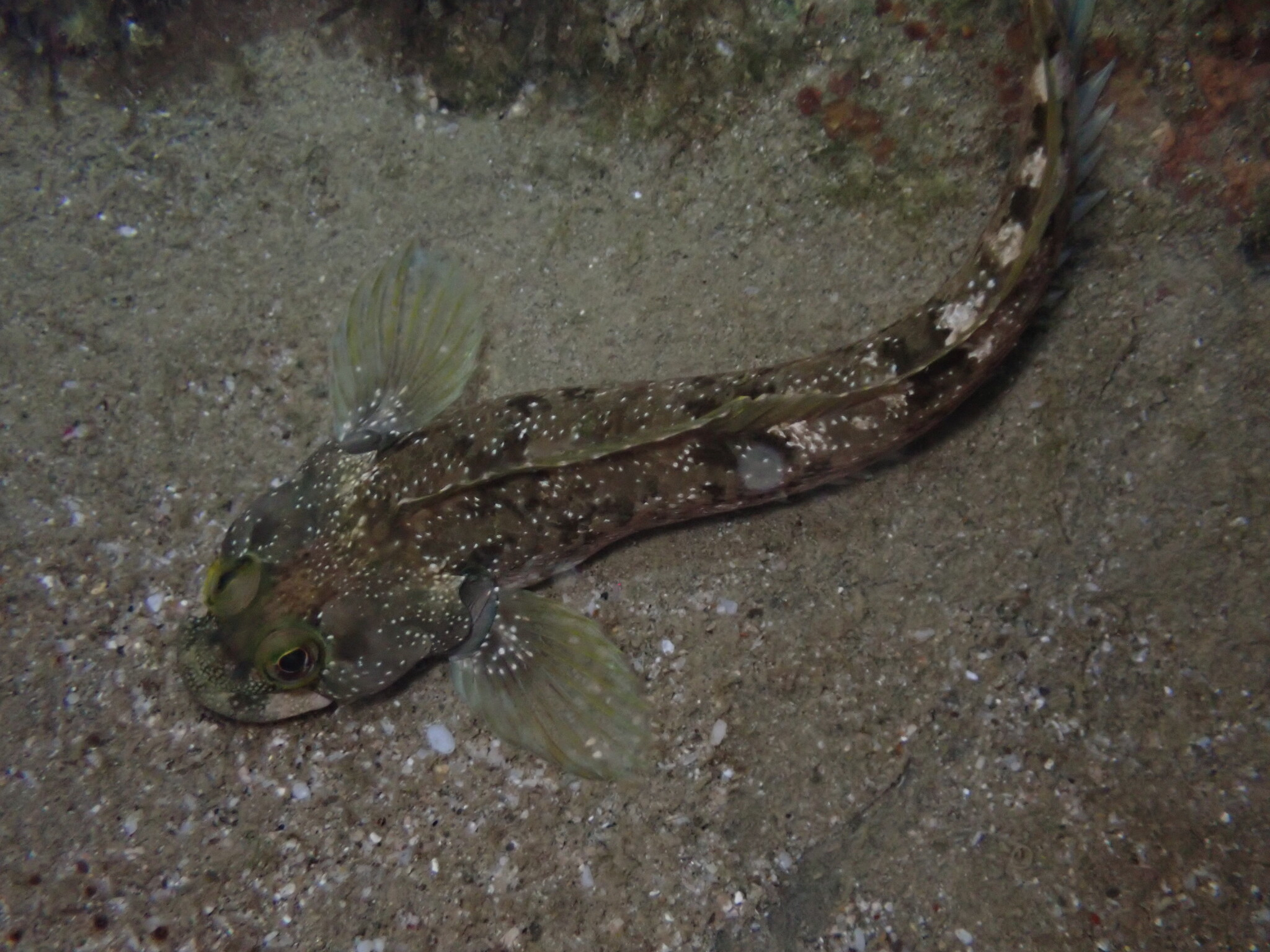

Conservation status
- Least Concern (IUCN 3.1)

Scientific classification
- Kingdom: Animalia
- Phylum: Chordata
- Class: Actinopterygii
- Order: Blenniiformes
- Family: Labrisomidae
- Genus: Dialommus
- Species: D. macrocephalus

Binomial name
- Dialommus macrocephalus (Günther, 1861)

Synonyms
- Clinus macrocephalus Günther, 1861; Mnierpes macrocephalus (Günther, 1861); Mnierpes macrocephalus catherinae C. Hubbs, 1952; Dialommus macrocephalus catherinae (C. Hubbs, 1952)

= Dialommus macrocephalus =

Species of fish

Dialommus macrocephalus, the foureye rockskipper, is a species of labrisomid blenny native to the eastern Pacific Ocean from Baja California, Mexico to Colombia. It inhabits the intertidal zone and is capable of leaving the water in search of land-dwelling prey. It feeds on invertebrates including crabs. This species can reach a length of 11 centimetres (4.3 in) TL.
