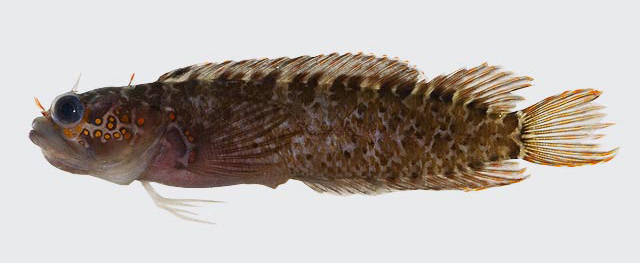

Conservation status
- Least Concern (IUCN 3.1)

Scientific classification
- Kingdom: Animalia
- Phylum: Chordata
- Class: Actinopterygii
- Order: Blenniiformes
- Family: Labrisomidae
- Genus: Starksia
- Species: S. ocellata

Binomial name
- Starksia ocellata (Steindachner, 1876)
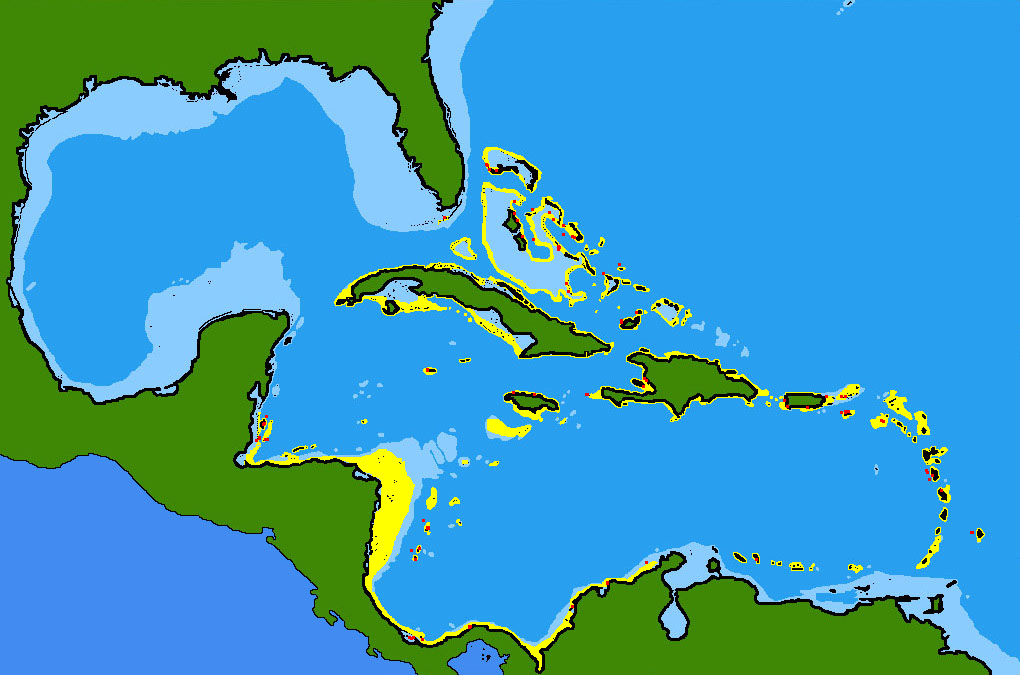

Synonyms
- Clinus ocellatus Steindachner, 1876

= Starksia ocellata =

Species of fish

Starksia ocellata, the checkered blenny, is a species of labrisomid blenny native to the Atlantic Ocean and the Caribbean Sea from North Carolina, United States, to Brazil. This species is an inhabitant of reefs at depths of from 2 to 20 m (6.6 to 65.6 ft) and can often be found living inside of tube sponges. It can reach a length of 6 cm (2.4 in) TL. It can also be found in the aquarium trade.
