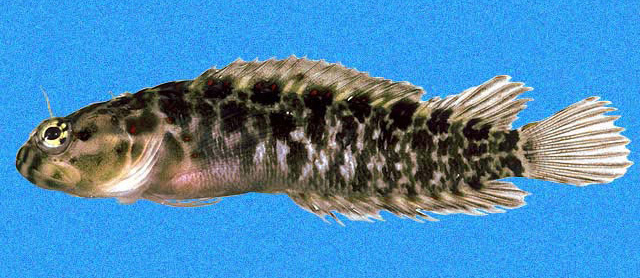

Conservation status
- Least Concern (IUCN 3.1)

Scientific classification
- Kingdom: Animalia
- Phylum: Chordata
- Class: Actinopterygii
- Order: Blenniiformes
- Family: Labrisomidae
- Genus: Starksia
- Species: S. culebrae

Binomial name
- Starksia culebrae (Evermann & M. C. Marsh, 1899)
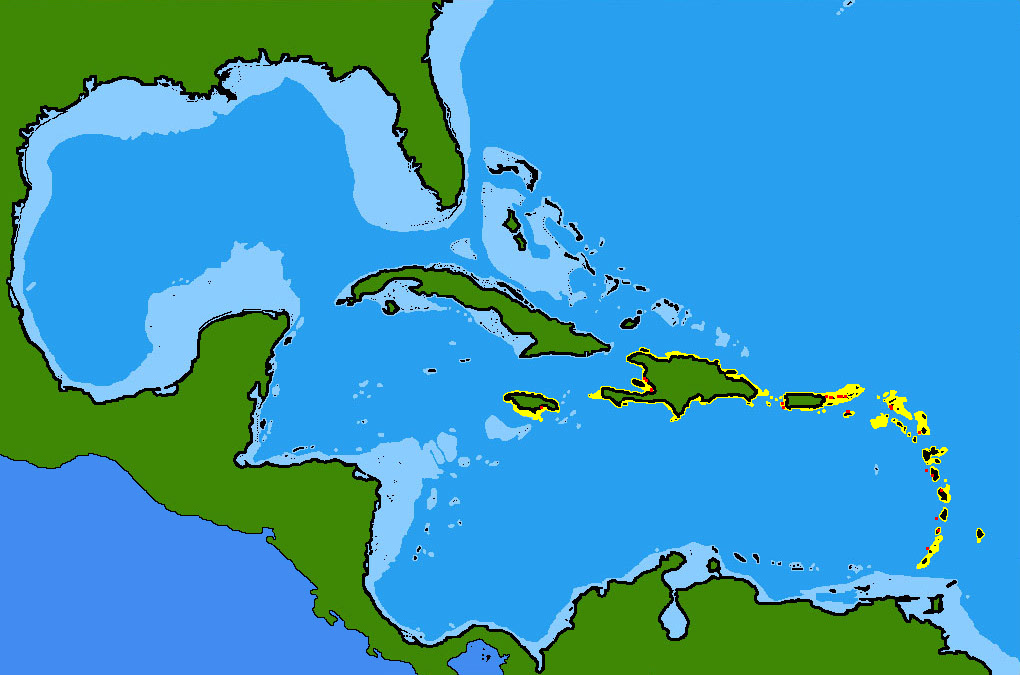

Synonyms
- Malacoctenus culebrae Evermann & M. C. Marsh, 1899

= Starksia culebrae =

Species of fish

Starksia culebrae or culebra blenny is a species of labrisomid blenny native to the waters around the Caribbean islands of the Antilles.
