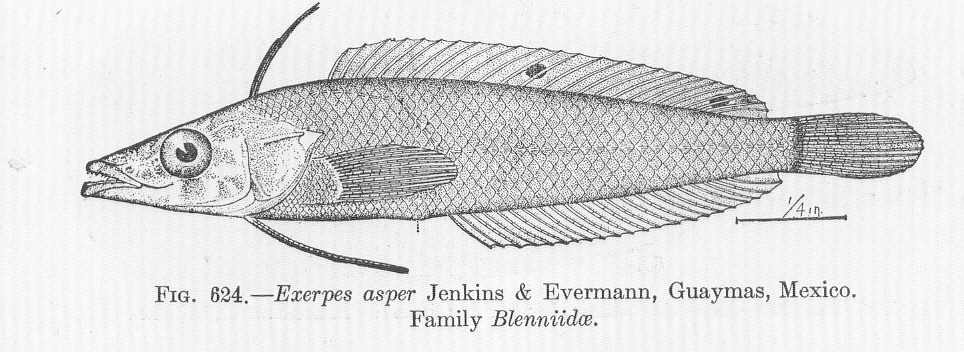

Conservation status
- Least Concern (IUCN 3.1)

Scientific classification
- Kingdom: Animalia
- Phylum: Chordata
- Class: Actinopterygii
- Order: Blenniiformes
- Family: Labrisomidae
- Genus: Exerpes; D. S. Jordan & Evermann, 1896
- Species: E. asper

Binomial name
- Exerpes asper (O. P. Jenkins & Evermann, 1889)

Synonyms
- Auchenopterus asper O. P. Jenkins & Evermann, 1889; Paraclinus asper (O.P. Jenkins & Evermann 1889)

= Exerpes =

Species of fish

Exerpes asper, the Sargassum blenny, is a species of labrisomid blenny native to the Gulf of California and the Pacific coast of Baja California. According to Fishbase it is currently the only known member of its genus, however, the Catalog of Fishes classifies it within the genus Paraclinus.

== Description ==
The Sargassum blenny has two quite distinct dorsal fins. The face is elongated and the mouth resembles that of a pike. There are no cirri. The general colour is brown with patches of silver on the flanks and there are 2 blue eyespots on the posterior dorsal fin. This fish grows to a length of 6.5 centimetres (2.6 in) TL.

== Biology ==
The Sargassum blenny lives among sargassum seaweed or in seagrass meadows where it is well camouflaged. It is found among the fronds of floating Sargassum mats. When threatened it tends to curl its head round near its tail and remain motionless, relying on its cryptic appearance to escape detection.
