= Dialommus =

Scientific classification
- Domain: Eukaryota
- Kingdom: Animalia
- Phylum: Chordata
- Class: Actinopterygii
- Order: Blenniiformes
- Family: Labrisomidae
- Genus: Dialommus; C. H. Gilbert, 1891

Type species
- Dialommus fuscus C. H. Gilbert, 1891

Synonyms
- Mnierpes D. S. Jordan & Evermann, 1896; Emmnion D. S. Jordan, 1897; Crockeridius H. W. Clark, 1936

Genus of fishes

Dialommus is a genus of labrisomid blennies native to the eastern Pacific Ocean.

== Species ==
There are currently two recognized species in this genus:

- Dialommus fuscus C. H. Gilbert, 1891 (Galápagos four-eyed blenny)
- Dialommus macrocephalus (Günther, 1861) (Foureye rockskipper)
