= Cryptotrema =

Scientific classification
- Domain: Eukaryota
- Kingdom: Animalia
- Phylum: Chordata
- Class: Actinopterygii
- Order: Blenniiformes
- Family: Labrisomidae
- Genus: Cryptotrema; C. H. Gilbert, 1890

Type species
- Cryptotrema corallinum C. H. Gilbert, 1890

Genus of fishes

Cryptotrema is a genus of labrisomid blennies native to the eastern Pacific Ocean.

== Species ==
There are currently two recognized species in this genus:

- Cryptotrema corallinum C. H. Gilbert, 1890 (Deep-water blenny)
- Cryptotrema seftoni C. Hubbs, 1954 (Hidden blenny)
