= Cottoclinus canops =

Conservation status
- Data Deficient (IUCN 3.1)

Scientific classification
- Kingdom: Animalia
- Phylum: Chordata
- Class: Actinopterygii
- Order: Blenniiformes
- Family: Labrisomidae
- Genus: Cottoclinus
- Species: C. canops

Binomial name
- Cottoclinus canops McCosker, J. S. Stephens & Rosenblatt, 2003

Species of fish

Cottoclinus canops is a species of labrisomid blenny endemic to the Galápagos Islands. Males of this species can reach a length of 4.5 centimetres (1.8 in) SL while females can reach a length of 5.4 centimetres (2.1 in). It is the only known member of its genus.
