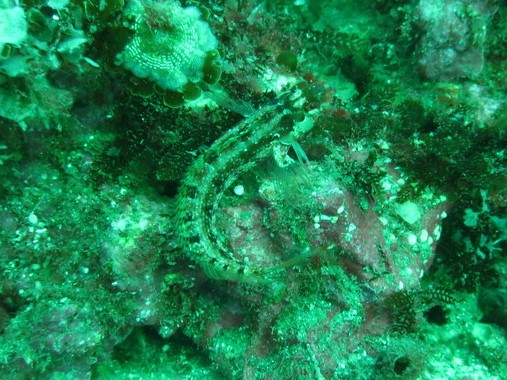

Conservation status
- Least Concern (IUCN 3.1)

Scientific classification
- Kingdom: Animalia
- Phylum: Chordata
- Class: Actinopterygii
- Order: Blenniiformes
- Family: Labrisomidae
- Genus: Alloclinus; C. L. Hubbs, 1927
- Species: A. holderi

Binomial name
- Alloclinus holderi (Lauderbach, 1907)

Synonyms
- (Species): Starksia holderi Lauderbach, 1907

= Alloclinus =

Genus of fishes

Alloclinus is a genus of blennies in the family Labrisomidae. It is monotypic, being represented by the single species, Alloclinus holderi, commonly known as the island kelpfish. Alloclinus holderi is a subtropical species native to the eastern Pacific Ocean from Santa Cruz Island, California, to Baja California. This species inhabits rocky areas and can be found down to about 49 m (161 ft). It can reach a length of 10 cm (3.9 in). The specific name honours the American naturalist, conservationist and author Charles Frederick Holder (1851-1915).
