= Xenomedea rhodopyga =

Conservation status
- Least Concern (IUCN 3.1)

Scientific classification
- Kingdom: Animalia
- Phylum: Chordata
- Class: Actinopterygii
- Order: Blenniiformes
- Family: Labrisomidae
- Genus: Xenomedea
- Species: X. rhodopyga

Binomial name
- Xenomedea rhodopyga Rosenblatt & L. R. Taylor, 1971

Species of fish

Xenomedea rhodopyga, common name the redrump blenny, is a species of labrisomid blenny endemic to the Gulf of California. It inhabits weed-covered rocky reefs and tide pools and can be found from very shallow waters to a depth of 8 metres (26 ft). This species can reach a length of 6.5 centimetres (2.6 in) TL.
