= Calliclinus =

Scientific classification
- Kingdom: Animalia
- Phylum: Chordata
- Class: Actinopterygii
- Order: Blenniiformes
- Family: Labrisomidae
- Genus: Calliclinus; T. N. Gill, 1860

Type species
- Clinus geniguttatus Valenciennes, 1836

Synonyms
- Myersichthys C. Hubbs, 1952; Pennaclinus F. de Buen, 1962

Genus of fishes

Calliclinus is a genus of labrisomid blennies native to the Pacific and Atlantic coasts of southern South America.

== Species ==
There are currently two recognized species in this genus:

- Calliclinus geniguttatus (Valenciennes, 1836)
- Calliclinus nudiventris Cervigón & Pequeño, 1979
