= One Fish, Two Fish, Crawfish, Bluefish =

2003 cookbook published by Smithsonian Institution Press

One Fish, Two Fish, Crawfish, Bluefish: The Smithsonian Sustainable Seafood Cookbook
- Author: Carole C. Baldwin; Julie H. Mounts
- Illustrator: Charlotte Knox
- Language: English
- Genre: Cookbook
- Publisher: Smithsonian Institution Press
- Publication date: October 2003
- Publication place: United States
- ISBN: 1-58834-169-0

One Fish, Two Fish, Crawfish, Bluefish: The Smithsonian Sustainable Seafood Cookbook (ISBN 1-58834-169-0) is a collection of 150 seafood recipes specifically chosen for their environmental sustainability. It was written by Carole C. Baldwin and Julie H. Mounts, illustrated by Charlotte Knox, and published in October 2003 by Smithsonian Institution Press.

Baldwin worked on a shrimp trawler as a marine biologist, where she observed problems with the fishing industry such as bycatch. This experience prompted her to begin working on the book, which she described as a "marine conservation project in the form of a cookbook."

Baldwin collaborated with Mounts, a research associate at the Smithsonian's National Museum of Natural History. They compiled a list of 86 fish species present in the United States and sent out a request for recipes to chefs across the country. Recipes from Wolfgang Puck, Alice Waters, Julia Child, and Charlie Trotter are featured in the cookbook.

The title of the book is a reference to One Fish Two Fish Red Fish Blue Fish, a popular children's book by Dr. Seuss.
