= Carole Baldwin =

Vertebrate Zoology department chair at the National Museum of Natural History

- Education: James Madison University (BS); College of Charleston (MS); College of William & Mary (PhD)
- Awards: 2003 Women Divers Hall of Fame
- Scientific career
- Fields: Vertebrate zoology, ichthyology
- Workplaces: National Museum of Natural History
- Author abbrev. (zoology): CC Baldwin, C Baldwin

Carole C. Baldwin is a research zoologist, curator of fishes, and the vertebrate zoology department chair at the National Museum of Natural History. She researches the diversity and evolution of coral reef and deep sea fishes through integrative taxonomy. She is on the board of directors of the National Aquarium in Washington, D.C

Baldwin is a senior author on the educational seafood cookbook One Fish, Two Fish, Crawfish, Bluefish - The Smithsonian Sustainable Seafood Cookbook, and the principal investigator on the Deep Reef Observation Project (DROP) which researches reefs to 300 meter depths. She was inducted into the Women Divers Hall of Fame in 2003.

== Life and career ==
Carole Baldwin grew up in coastal South Carolina, and always loved the ocean. She discovered her interest in biology during her freshman year at James Madison University. Baldwin graduated magna cum laude from James Madison University on 1981 with a B.S. in Biology. She then attended the College of Charleston for her M.S. in Marine Biology, which she received in 1986. In 1992, she completed her PhD in Marine Science from the College of William & Mary, School of Marine Science. She was appointed as a Research Zoologist at the Smithsonian's National Museum of Natural History (NMNH) in the Division of Fishes. She was a curator for the Sant Ocean Hall in the museum. She is also the Vertebrate Zoology Department Chair.

Baldwin has discovered a few dozen species of marine fishes. Many of these species were discovered in the Deep Reef Observation Project (Drop), which researched reefs to 300 meters using a five person submersible. Baldwin is the principal investigator of the project which is based in Curaçao. The project involves people from the NMNH, the Smithsonian Marine Station at Fort Pierce, Florida, and the Smithsonian Tropical Research Institute in Panama.

Baldwin is dedicated to bringing science to the public. She was the filmed for and was the scientific advisor for the Smithsonian's 3D IMAX film Galapagos, and was a guest on Smithsonian Science How?. She helped curate information for an exhibit at the Smithsonian called "Ocean Hall." She is on the board of directors of the National Aquarium, and the editorial board of Zookeys. She has also served on the elected council since 2010 and the membership committee since 2011 for the Biological Society of Washington.

== Awards and honors ==
Baldwin has won a few awards including the NMNH Peer Recognition Award for service as Curator of Sant Ocean Hall and the Ronald E. Carrier Distinguished Alumni Award from James Madison University. In 2003 she was inducted into the Women Divers Hall of Fame.

== Select publications ==
Baldwin is the senior author on the cookbook One Fish, Two Fish, Crawfish, Bluefish - The Smithsonian Sustainable Seafood Cookbook and has authored over 70 papers, ten of which are listed below.

- CC Baldwin, DG Johnson. 1993. Phylogeny of the Epinephelinae (Teleostei: Serranidae). Bulletin of Marine Science 52 (1), 240-283. http://www.ingentaconnect.com/content/umrsmas/bullmar/1993/00000052/00000001/art00010;jsessionid=2f5ios4wl4hcb.x-ic-live-03.
- CC Baldwin, GD Johnson. 1996. Interrelationships of aulopiformes. Smithsonian Institution. https://repository.si.edu/bitstream/handle/10088/11710/vz_baldwin_1996.pdf?sequence=1&isAllowed=y.
- JE Olney, DG Johnson, CC Baldwin. 1993. Phylogeny of lampridiform fishes. Bulletin of Marine Science 52 (1), 137-169. https://www.ingentaconnect.com/content/umrsmas/bullmar/1993/00000052/00000001/art00006?crawler=true.
- CC Baldwin, JH Mounts, DG Smith, LA Weigt. 2009. Genetic identification and color descriptions of early life-history stages of Belizean Phaeoptyx and Astrapogon (Teleostei: Apogonidae) with Comments on identification of adult Phaeoptyx. Zootaxa 2008: 1-22. https://repository.si.edu/bitstream/handle/10088/7453/zt02008p022.pdf.
- Weigt, Lee A; Baldwin, Carole C; Driskell, Amy; Smith, David G; Ormos, Andrea; Reyier, Eric A (2012). "Using DNA Barcoding to Assess Caribbean Reef Fish Biodiversity: Expanding Taxonomic and Geographic Coverage". PLOS ONE. 7 (7) e41059. Bibcode:2012PLoSO...741059W. doi:10.1371/journal.pone.0041059. PMC 3398874. PMID 22815912.
- Baldwin, Carole; Castillo, Cristina; Weigt, Lee; Victor, Benjamin (2011). "Seven new species within western Atlantic Starksia atlantica, S. Lepicoelia, and S. Sluiteri (Teleostei, Labrisomidae), with comments on congruence of DNA barcodes and species". ZooKeys (79): 21–72. Bibcode:2011ZooK...79...21B. doi:10.3897/zookeys.79.1045. PMC 3088046. PMID 21594143.
- Vaslet, A; Phillips, D.L; France, C; Feller, I.C; Baldwin, C.C (2012). "The relative importance of mangroves and seagrass beds as feeding areas for resident and transient fishes among different mangrove habitats in Florida and Belize: Evidence from dietary and stable-isotope analyses". Journal of Experimental Marine Biology and Ecology. 434–435: 81–93. Bibcode:2012JEMBE.434...81V. doi:10.1016/j.jembe.2012.07.024.
- Chakrabarty, Prosanta; Warren, Melanie; Page, Lawrence; Baldwin, Carole (2013). "Gen Seq: An updated nomenclature and ranking for genetic sequences from type and non-type sources". ZooKeys (346): 29–41. Bibcode:2013ZooK..346...29C. doi:10.3897/zookeys.346.5753. PMC 3821064. PMID 24223486.
- L Tornabene, C Baldwin, LA Weigt, F Pezold. 2010. Exploring the diversity of western Atlantic Bathygobius (Teleostei: Gobiidae) with cytochrome c oxidase-I, with descriptions of two new species. Aqua 16 (4), 141-170. https://www.researchgate.net/profile/Frank_Pezold/publication/235220047_Exploring_the_diversity_of_western_Atlantic_Bathygobius_Teleostei_Gobiidaewith_cytochrome_c_oxidase-I_with_descriptions_of_two_new_species/links/59d6958ca6fdcc52aca7cfe2/Exploring-the-diversity-of-western-Atlantic-Bathygobius-Teleostei-Gobiidae-with-cytochrome-c-oxidase-I-with-descriptions-of-two-new-species.pdf.
- Baldwin, Carole C (1990). "Morphology of the Larvae of American Anthiinae (Teleostei: Serranidae), with Comments on Relationships within the Subfamily". Copeia. 1990 (4): 913–955. doi:10.2307/1446477. JSTOR 1446477.
