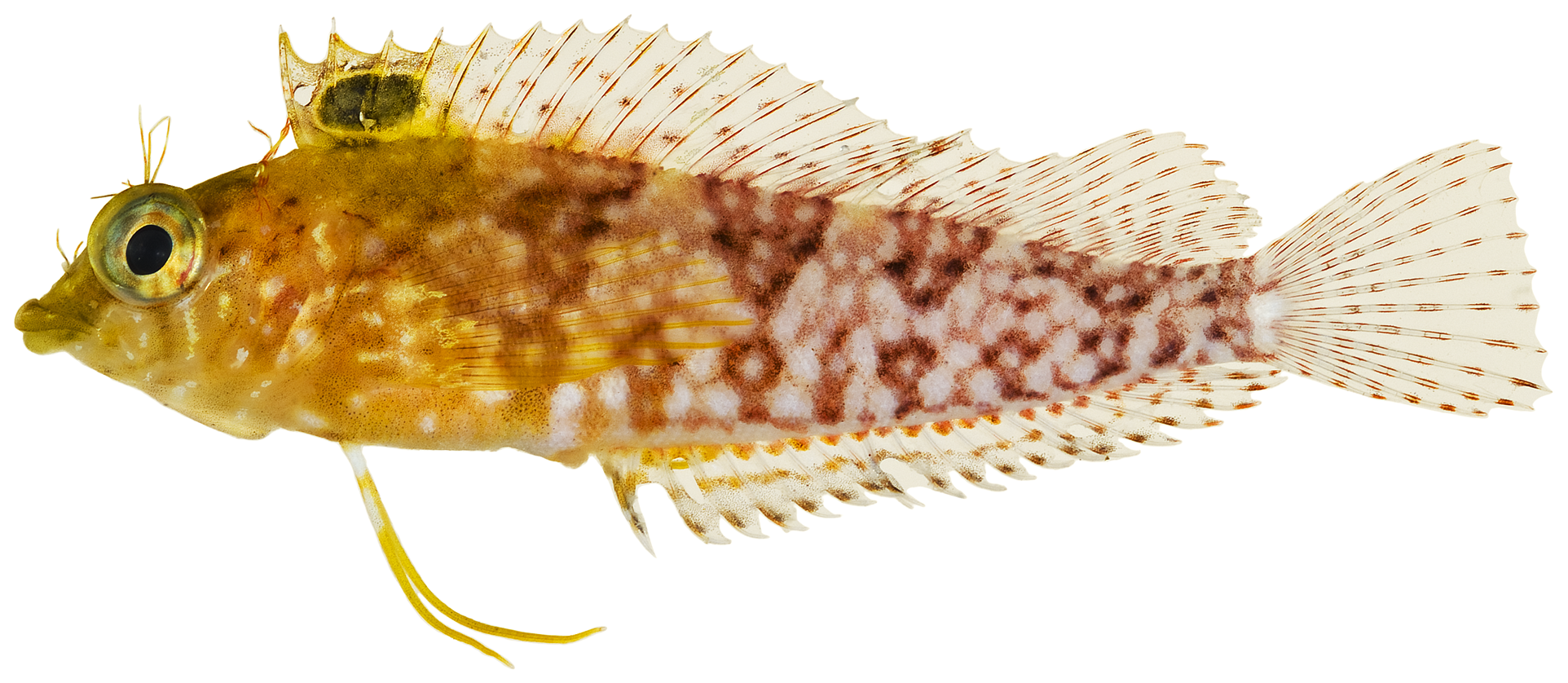
- Malacoctenus boehlkei

Scientific classification
- Kingdom: Animalia
- Phylum: Chordata
- Class: Actinopterygii
- Order: Blenniiformes
- Suborder: Blennioidei
- Family: Labrisomidae; C. Hubbs, 1952

Genera
- See text.
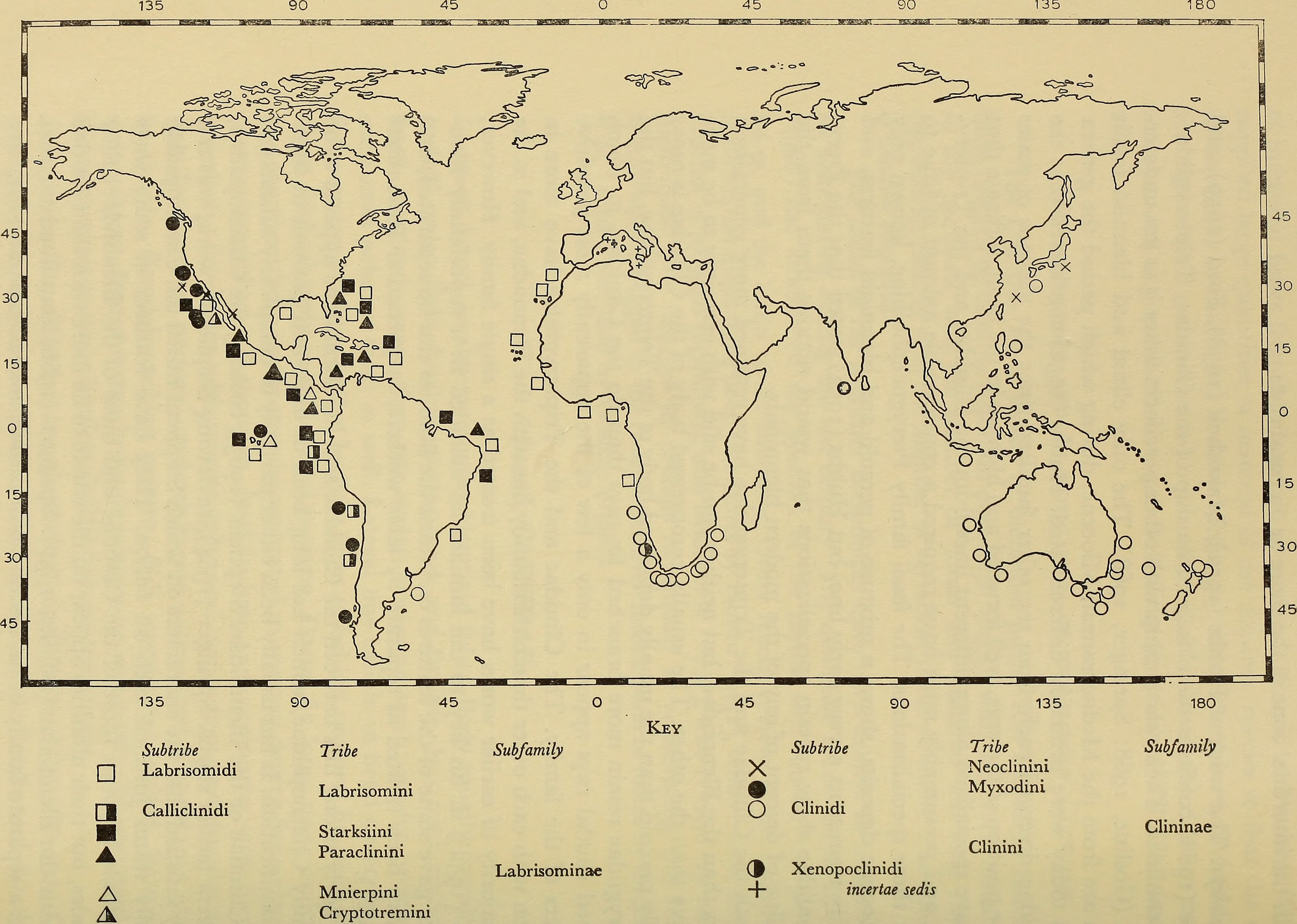
- range map

= Labrisomid =

Family of fishes

Labrisomids, also called scaly blennies, are small blennioids (blennies), percomorph marine fish belonging to the family Labrisomidae. Found mostly in the tropical Atlantic and Pacific Ocean, the family contains about 110 species in 15 genera.

Stockier than the average blenny, labrisomids are elongated nonetheless; their dorsal fin spines outnumber soft rays (which may be absent altogether), and their pelvic fins are long and slender. Like many other blennies, labrisomids have whisker-like structures called cirri on their heads and napes. Scales may be cycloid or absent in labrisomids; many species are brightly coloured. Labrisomus philippii is the largest species at 35 cm in length; most are far smaller.

Generally staying within shallow coastal regions to depths around 10 m, labrisomids are benthic fish spending most of their time on or near the bottom. Both sandy and rocky substrates are frequented, sometimes at reefs or amongst beds of seagrass. Labrisomids are shy fish and will retreat into crevices if threatened. Crustaceans, gastropods, brittle stars, and sea urchins make up much of the labrisomid diet.

Two genera of labrisomid are noted for their ovoviviparity; Xenomedea and Starksia both retain eggs within their oviducts, where they develop in safety. However, only Starksia species possess gonopodia (modified anal fins used as a copulatory organ).

Some workers have found that the Labrisomidae is paraphyletic.

== Genera ==
The following genera are currently included in this family:

- Alloclinus C. L. Hubbs, 1927
- Auchenionchus Gill, 1860
- Brockius Clark L. Hubbs, 1953
- Calliclinus Gill, 1860
- Cottoclinus McCosker, Stephens & Rosenblatt, 2003
- Cryptotrema Gilbert, 1890
- Dialommus Gilbert, 1891
- Exerpes Jordan & Evermann, 1896
- Gobioclinus Gill, 1860
- Haptoclinus Böhlke & Robertson, 1974
- Labrisomus Swainson, 1839
- Malacoctenus Gill, 1860
- Nemaclinus Böhlke & Springer, 1975
- Paraclinus Mocquard, 1888
- Starksia Jordan & Evermann, 1896
- Xenomedea Rosenblatt & Taylor, 1971
