= Stockham =

Stockham can refer to:

== People ==
- Alice Bunker Stockham (1833-1912), fifth woman doctor in the United States
- Bob Stockham (born 1970), American football player
- Fred W. Stockham (1881-1918), United States Marine, posthumous recipient of the Medal of Honor
- John Stockham (1765-1814), British naval officer
- Thomas Stockham (1933-2004), American scientist

== Places ==
- Stockham, Nebraska, a village in Hamilton County, Nebraska, in the United States

== Ships ==
- HMS Stockham (K562), a British frigate in service in the Royal Navy from 1943 to 1946
- USS Stockham, more than one United States Navy ship

== Other uses ==
- Stockham FFT, a type of FFT algorithm
