= Darius Guppy =

British businessman

- Born: June 1964 (age 62); Westminster, London, England
- Education: Lycée Français Charles de Gaulle; Eton College; Magdalen College, Oxford
- Spouse: Patricia Holder (m. 1991; sep. 2021)
- Children: 3
- Parents: Shusha Guppy; Nicholas Guppy

Darius Guppy (born June 1964) is a British businessman. He was formerly a close friend of Earl Spencer, brother of Diana, Princess of Wales, and the former UK prime minister Boris Johnson. In 1993 he was sentenced to five years imprisonment for insurance fraud.

== Early life and education ==
Darius Guppy was born June 1964 in London to the English writer Nicholas Guppy (1925-2012) and Iranian author and singer Shusha, née Assār (1935-2008), daughter of the philosopher and theologian Grand Ayatollah Seyyed Mohammed Kazem Assar, who held the chair of philosophy at Tehran University. On his father's side, he is a descendant of Lechmere Guppy, the naturalist who discovered the eponymous fish, as well as the inventor Sarah Guppy, Thomas Guppy, the engineer and business partner of Isambard Kingdom Brunel, the explorer Amelia Guppy, Sir Francis Dashwood and the Plantagenet family.

Guppy was educated at the Lycée Français Charles de Gaulle, Eton College, and Magdalen College, Oxford. In his second year, he became a member of the Piers Gaveston Society, as well as the Bullingdon Club. He was the best man at Earl Spencer's wedding to model Victoria Lockwood, his first wife; Lord Spencer was his best man in return. He was a close friend of Boris Johnson, who later became the mayor of London and British prime minister, as well as of Count Gottfried von Bismarck.

== Personal life ==
He married Patricia Holder in 1991. The couple had a daughter and twin sons, and lived in Cape Town, South Africa. In 2021, Holder filed for divorce, accusing Guppy of physical and verbal abuse. Guppy referred to the accusations as ranging from "inflammatory to untrue".

== Boris Johnson and journalist from News of the World ==
During a telephone call in 1990, Guppy asked Boris Johnson (then a journalist at The Telegraph) to provide the home address of News of the World journalist Stuart Collier. Collier had been making enquiries into Guppy's background, and in response, Guppy wanted to send someone to physically assault Collier. A tape of the conversation was leaked to the press in June 1995.

== Insurance and VAT fraud ==
In February 1993, Guppy was jailed for staging a faked jewel robbery and claiming £1.8 million from the insurers. Guppy claimed this was intended as retribution against Lloyd's of London, since his father had lost money in Lloyd's financial crisis of the 1990s.

Guppy and a business partner, Benedict Marsh, hired a man to fake a robbery, discharge a firearm and tie them up. They were both convicted of conspiracy involving fraud, theft and false accounting at Snaresbrook Crown Court. Guppy was sentenced to five years in prison. Guppy also pleaded guilty in March 1993 to three separate charges, relating to illegal VAT claims on gold bullion later smuggled into India between October 1989 and July 1990.

== Writing ==
Guppy has written for The Spectator, the Asia Times, the Independent on Sunday and The Independent, The Sunday Telegraph, and the New Statesman. Guppy has also published poetry. His autobiography, Roll the Dice, was issued by Blake Publishing in 1996.

== Bibliography ==
- Guppy, Darius (1996). Roll the Dice. Blake Publishing. ISBN 1-85782-159-9.
- VAT 1 The Story of VAT Fraud on Gold in the early 1990s BigFoot. Amazon Direct Publishing. 2013. ISBN 978-1536881219.
