= William Lechmere =

Vice-Admiral William Lechmere
- Born: c. 1752
- Died: 12 December 1815; Hill House, Steeple Aston, Oxfordshire
- Relatives: Nicholas Lechmere, 1st Baron Lechmere (uncle)
- Military career
- Allegiance: United Kingdom of Great Britain and Ireland
- Branch: Royal Navy
- Service years: –1815
- Rank: Vice-Admiral of the White
- Commands: HMS Thorn; HMS Saturn; HMS Jupiter; HMS St Albans; HMS Resolution; HMS Thunderer; HMS Prince; HMS Dreadnought
- Conflicts: American Revolutionary War; French Revolutionary Wars; Napoleonic Wars; Battle of Cape Finisterre

William Lechmere (c. 1752 – 12 December 1815) was an officer of the Royal Navy who served during the American War of Independence and the French Revolutionary and Napoleonic Wars.

Lechmere joined the navy and saw service during the American War of Independence, having been promoted to lieutenant in 1774, and then to commander in 1782. He was given his own ship, a sloop, and served off the North American coast for the remainder of the war, until paying off the ship in 1785. He spent time ashore during the years of peace, marrying and receiving a promotion to post captain before the outbreak of the French Revolutionary Wars. He returned to service in 1794 and commanded several ships in British waters. During this time he assisted in the transport of Princess Caroline of Brunswick to Britain. He then spent some time on the Halifax station, but like many of his contemporaries he struggled at times to secure postings, and spent some time without a ship.

He was back in command of a ship in 1805, and saw action at the Battle of Cape Finisterre with Sir Robert Calder's fleet, an action that had a significant impact on his life. Although he went on to join the fleet assembling off Cádiz under Lord Nelson, he agreed to return to Britain to support Calder at his court-martial, leaving the fleet a week before the Battle of Trafalgar. His first lieutenant, John Stockham, instead commanded his ship and received a share of the rewards. Lechmere had missed one of the most decisive battles of his career, but he went on to command other ships and receive further promotions, eventually dying at the close of the Napoleonic Wars in 1815.

== Family and early life ==
Lechmere was born in 1752, the son of Richard Lechmere and his wife Elizabeth, née Corfield. He was the nephew of Nicholas Lechmere, 1st Baron Lechmere. William joined the Royal Navy and was commissioned as a lieutenant on 20 December 1774. He served during the American War of Independence, being promoted to commander on 23 September 1782 and appointed to command the sloop HMS Thorn. Thorn had been recently recaptured from the Americans, and Lechmere sailed her to Britain and paid her off for repairs and refitting at Sheerness Dockyard. He recommissioned her in April 1783 and sailed to Newfoundland in May 1784. He later returned to Britain, but was back at Newfoundland in April 1785, before Thorn was paid off in November 1785.

== Interwar and return to service ==
Lechmere took advantage of the peace and married Elizabeth, the daughter of Sir John Dashwood-King, at St Martin-in-the-Fields, Westminster on 31 October 1787. He was promoted to post captain on 21 September 1790, but it was not until August 1794, after the outbreak of the French Revolutionary Wars, that he took up his first independent command, the 74-gun HMS Saturn. Lechmere commanded Saturn in the Downs as the flagship of Rear-Admiral George Vandeput. He was transferred to the 50-gun HMS Jupiter in January 1795, and remained in command of her until February 1796. During this time Jupiter flew the broad pennant of Commodore John Willett Payne and also served as a Royal escort for Princess Caroline of Brunswick. Princess Caroline left from Cuxhaven on 28 March 1795 in the Jupiter and, delayed by poor weather, landed at Greenwich on 5 April.

Lechmere took command of the 64-gun HMS St Albans in 1796, during which time she was the flagship of Vice-Admiral George Vandeput on the Halifax station. He went out to Lisbon in February 1797 and there captured the Spanish privateer Atrebedo on 28 February. He moved to the 74-gun HMS Resolution in July 1797 and resumed his previous duties as commander of Vandeput's flagship at Halifax. He commanded Resolution until paying her off in October 1798. He then appears to have been unemployed for a period, as he is not recorded in command of a ship until April 1805, when he superseded Captain William Bedford, and commissioned the 74-gun HMS Thunderer.

== Present at Finisterre, absent at Trafalgar ==
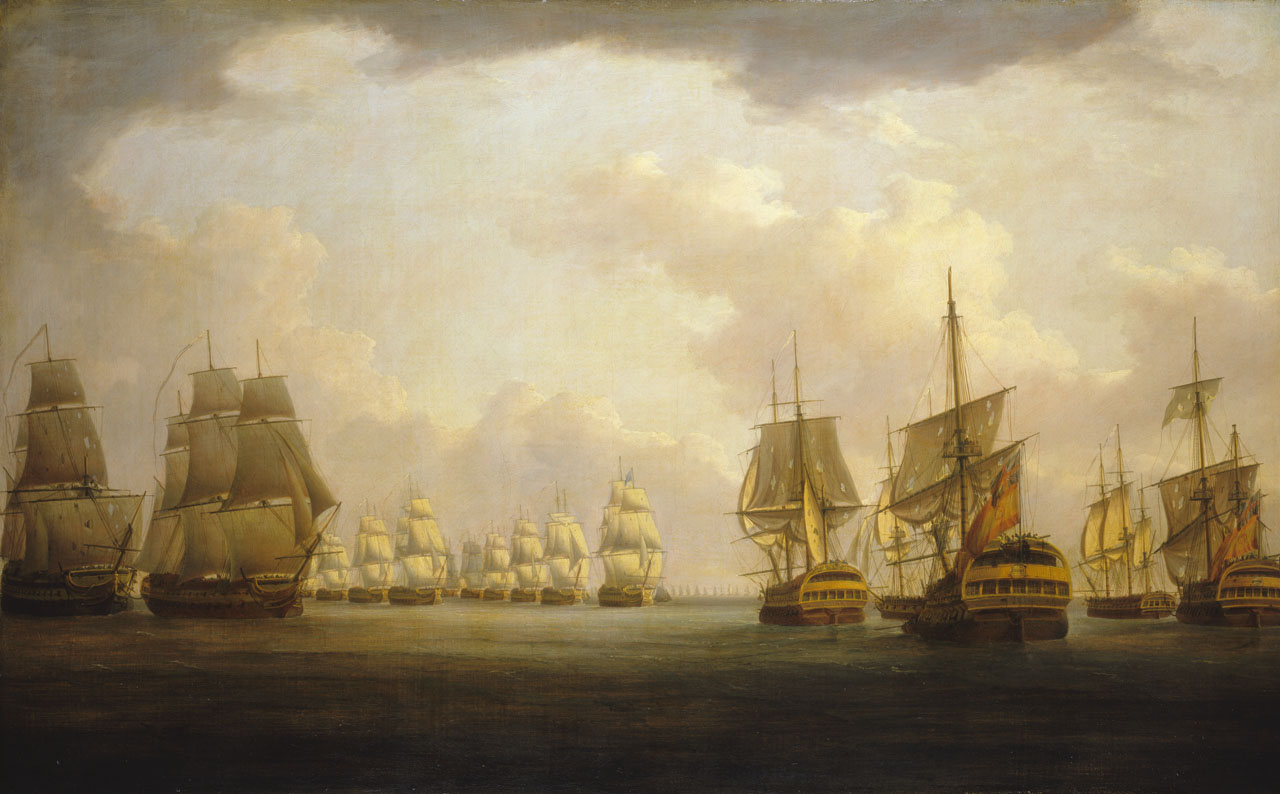
Admiral Sir Robert Calder's action off Cape Finisterre, 23 July 1805, by William Anderson

Thunderer was assigned to the fleet under Admiral Robert Calder, tasked with intercepting the Franco-Spanish fleet under Vice-Admiral Pierre-Charles Villeneuve as it returned from the Caribbean. Calder intercepted the combined fleet and brought them to battle on 22 July 1805. Thunderer was involved in the fighting as the second to last ship in Calder's line, and had seven men killed and eleven wounded. Thunderer, HMS Malta and several of the frigates had drifted some six miles distant of the admiral on the morning of 23 July, and took no part in the second indecisive clash of the battle. The fleets then parted, with Calder's force sailing to the north with the prizes, where they met the fleet arriving from the West Indies under Lord Nelson. After sending several ships, including Thunderer, into port, Calder sailed south to join Vice-Admiral Cuthbert Collingwood off Cádiz.

While refitting, Lechmere received orders to join Collingwood at Cádiz, and on repairs being completed, joined Vice-Admiral Nelson's 100-gun HMS Victory and the 36-gun HMS Euryalus under Captain Henry Blackwood off Plymouth and sailed for Cádiz. Calder had been criticised for failing to win a decisive victory, and on arriving off Cádiz and assuming command of the fleet, Nelson passed on the Admiralty's orders to Calder which summoned him back to Britain to face a court martial. Nelson was also required to allow those captains who had fought with Calder and wished to give evidence in his support to return to England to give evidence at his court-martial. Lechmere was one of those who agreed to go, as did Captain William Brown of HMS Ajax. Brown and Lechmere handed command of their ships temporarily over to their first lieutenants, John Pilfold and John Stockham respectively, and sailed for Britain with Calder on 14 October, five days before the combined fleet sailed from Cádiz, and seven days before the Battle of Trafalgar took place. Consequently Lechmere was absent when the battle took place, and Stockham instead received a share of the rewards of a grateful nation, being promoted to post captain, while Lechmere was overlooked.

== Later commands ==
Despite having missed his opportunity to take part in the decisive naval battle of the wars, Lechmere received several other commands, taking over the 98-gun HMS Prince in the Mediterranean on 13 April 1806, and commanding her until her return to Plymouth in October that year. He was appointed a Colonel of Marines on 6 October 1806. His final seagoing command was the 98-gun HMS Dreadnought, which he took over on 26 December 1806 and commanded in the English Channel until his promotion to rear-admiral of the blue on 28 April 1808. He does not appear to have ever raised his flag, but continued to be promoted. He was advanced to rear-admiral of the red on 31 July 1810, vice-admiral of the blue on 12 August 1812, and finally vice-admiral of the white on 4 June 1814.

Vice-Admiral William Lechmere died at Hill House, Steeple Aston, Oxfordshire on 12 December 1815 at the age of 63. He had had a number of children, several of whom followed him into the navy. Among them was his eldest son, Charles, who was born on 4 December 1789 and died in command of HMS Leven off the West African coast on 9 November 1822. One of his daughters, Mary, married James Saumarez, son of the naval officer James Saumarez, 1st Baron de Saumarez. His daughter Lucy (1788-1834) married Richard Parkinson, of Kinnersley Castle, and was mother of the artist and photographer Amelia Elizabeth Guppy and grandmother of the naturalist Robert John Lechmere Guppy.

== Sources ==
- The Gentleman's Magazine. Vol. 77. F. Jefferies. 1807.
- Adkin, Mark (2007). The Trafalgar Companion: A Guide to History's Most Famous Sea Battle and the Life of Admiral Lord Nelson. London: Aurum Press. ISBN 978-1-84513-018-3.
- Bennett, Geoffrey (2004). The Battle of Trafalgar. Pen and Sword. ISBN 978-1-84415-107-3.
- Burke, Bernard (1800). A Genealogical and Heraldic Dictionary of the Landed Gentry of Great Britain and Ireland. Vol. 2. J. Gold.
- Clarke, James Stanier (1863). The Naval Chronicle. Vol. 3. Harrison.
- Clayton, Tim; Craig, Phil (2004). Trafalgar: The Men, The Battle, The Storm. London: Hodder. ISBN 0-340-83028-X.
- Goodwin, Peter (2005). The Ships of Trafalgar: The British, French and Spanish Fleets, October 1805. Conway Maritime Press. ISBN 978-1-84486-015-9.
- Winfield, Rif (2007). British Warships in the Age of Sail 1714–1792: Design, Construction, Careers and Fates. Seaforth. ISBN 978-1-84415-700-6.
- Winfield, Rif (2007). British Warships in the Age of Sail 1793–1817: Design, Construction, Careers and Fates. Seaforth. ISBN 978-1-86176-246-7.
