= Gobioclinus guppyi =

Conservation status
- Least Concern (IUCN 3.1)

Scientific classification
- Kingdom: Animalia
- Phylum: Chordata
- Class: Actinopterygii
- Order: Blenniiformes
- Family: Labrisomidae
- Genus: Gobioclinus
- Species: G. guppyi

Binomial name
- Gobioclinus guppyi (Norman, 1922)

Synonyms
- Clinus guppyi Norman, 1922; Labrisomus guppyi (Norman, 1922)

Species of fish

Gobioclinus guppyi, the mimic blenny, is a species of labrisomid blenny native to the western Atlantic Ocean and the Caribbean Sea from south Florida to Fernando de Noronha. It inhabits areas such as reefs, near shore areas with rock or rubble covered in algae, and in beds of seagrass. This species can reach a length of 11.5 centimetres (4.5 in) TL. The specific name honours Robert Lechmere Guppy who collected the type and sent it to the British Museum (Natural History), he was also the father of Robert John Lechmere Guppy who discovered the guppy.
