= USS Stockham =

USS Stockham or USNS Stockham may refer to more than one United States Navy ship:

- The initially unnamed destroyer escort DE-97, transferred upon completion to the United Kingdom, which served in the Royal Navy as HMS Stockham (K562) from 1943 to 1946 and kept its name upon its return to the US.
- USS Stockham (DD-683), a destroyer in commission from 1944 to 1946 and from 1951 to 1957

== See also ==
- USNS GySgt. Fred W. Stockham, ex-USNS Soderman, a container and roll-on roll-off ship, acquired in 1997 for service in a non-commissioned status with the Military Sealift Command and still in active service
