= Amelia Elizabeth Guppy =

British artist and photographer

- Born: Amelia Elizabeth Parkinson; November 21, 1808; Hertfordshire, England
- Died: 1886 (aged 77–78); British Trinidad (now Trinidad and Tobago)
- Known for: Photography
- Spouse: Robert Guppy (m. 1834)
- Children: 4, including Robert
- Relatives: William Lechmere (maternal grandfather)

Amelia Elizabeth Guppy, née Parkinson (November 21, 1808 – 1886), was an early artist and photographer from the United Kingdom.

== Life ==
Amelia Elizabeth Guppy was born at Bullingham Court in Hertfordshire on 21 November 1808, the eldest child of wealthy parents Richard Parkinson (abt 1782-1851) and Lucy (1788-1834), née Lechmere, daughter of Royal Navy officer William Lechmere, Vice-Admiral of the White living at Kinnersley Castle. She studied art under David Cox. She eloped to marry Robert Guppy, a member of the Bar of the Middle Temple, on 12 Nov 1834 at Bitterley Court, Shropshire, even though the marriage was approved by both families, perhaps to avoid a society marriage. They moved to Trinidad in 1837 and lived at La Falaise estate, Pointe-a-Pierre Road, Naparima Hill, San Fernando. Her husband, Robert, was assisting the Protheroe relatives of Amelia's brother-in-law, Samuel Guppy, Jr., with the legal issues around the emancipation of the slaves on the Protheroe plantations in the south of Trinidad. Robert later became Mayor of San Fernando for many years.

Amelia was a painter and photographer, and spent much time in Trinidad painting the local scenery and plants, particularly the orchids. She loved orchids, collected, them, painted, named and classified them, and even planted them in trees around her house. She spent time sketching travelling around the island on a white mule, sometimes for days at a time, with a young man, Thorpe, whom she trained to be her assistant. In later years she had a house built for her in the trees where she could stay in safety. Life in Trinidad did not suit Amelia well, as she valued intellectual companionship, and she regularly returned to England. Her granddaughter, Yseult (Guppy) Bridges, in her memoir, "Child of the Tropics", says, "She was a lady of wildly independent mould and adventurous spirit.", and "She missed the intellectual and artistic stimulus of the circles in which she had moved in England, and found her society [in Trinidad] restricted to that of people whose interests and outlook were severely limited. . . She found them boring and tedious, and they found her incomprehensible and alarming."

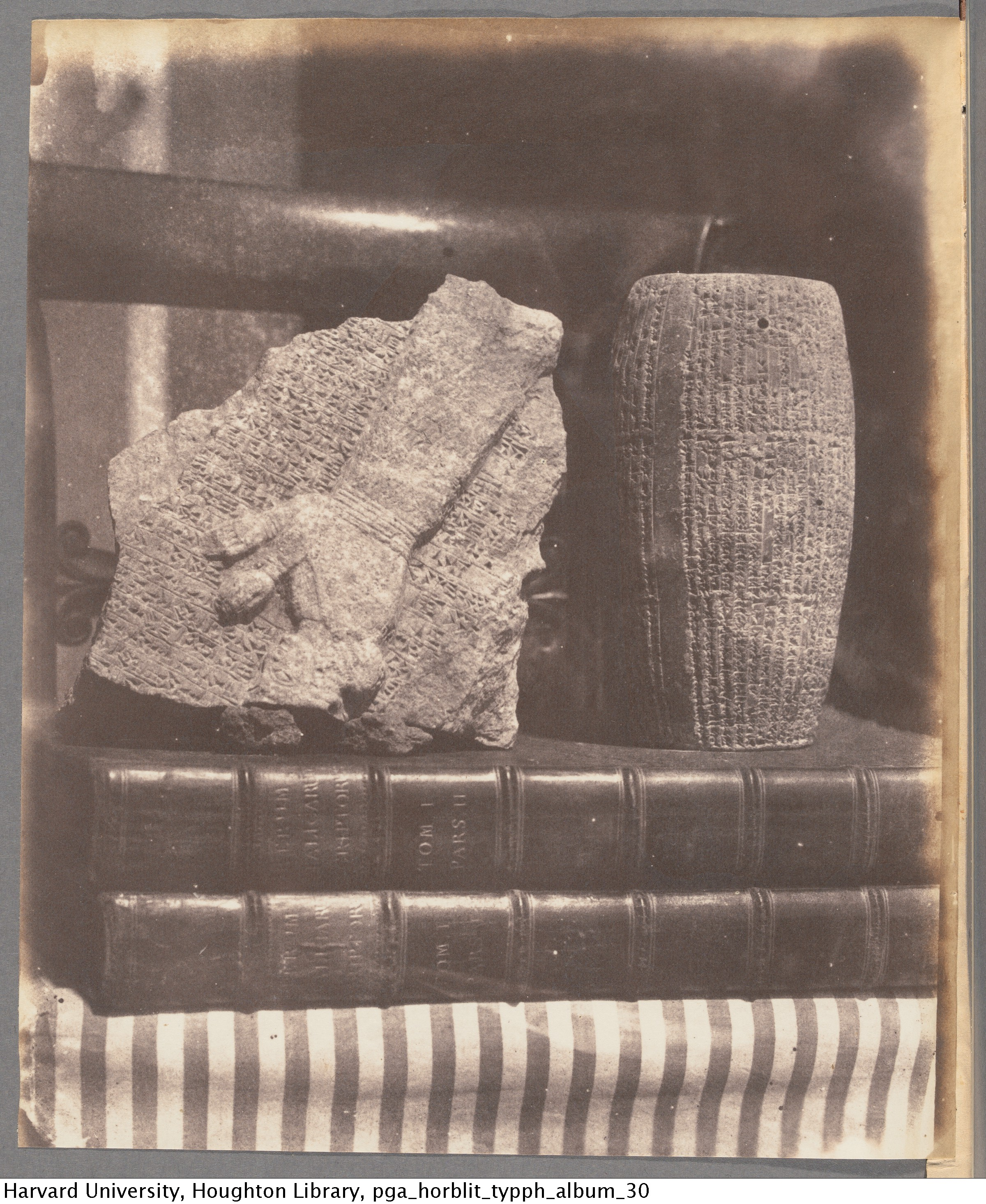
Still life with ancient Babylonian artifacts on books, salted paper print, 1853, Houghton Library

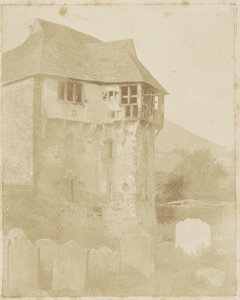
Stekesley (sic) Castle; Attributed to Amelia Elizabeth Guppy

Her earliest known picture is of her child in 1847. In 1854 she recorded Stokesay Castle. She is known for her photographs including the many she made for the eccentric English bibliophile Thomas Phillipps. Her children included Robert John Lechmere Guppy who was brought up at Kinnersley Castle by Richard and Lucy Parkinson. Her other children were Lucy Lechmere Guppy (1835-1907), who married Theodore Walter, Henry Francis Jeune Guppy (1839-1872), who married Alida Wigger, and Marguerite Eleamire Clotilda Guppy (1840-1872) who married John Percy. All the children were raised by their grandparents, Francis and Lucy being sent to Robert's parents, Samuel and Sarah Guppy, in Clifton, when the couple moved to Trinidad.

Amelia's son Henry Francis Jeune Guppy and his wife, Alida Wigger, are the ancestors of the Guppy families of Paraguay, Argentina and Chile.

In 1871, at the age of 63, she set out on an adventure to Venezuela. She travelled alone around the Orinoco River, up which no white person had previously travelled for any distance, keen to capture the orchids there.

Amelia Guppy died in 1886 in Trinidad, and is buried in San Fernando. Many of her works were destroyed by being stored badly during the Second World War.

Her granddaughter, Yseult Bridges, says, "She died in 1886, . . . and old woman burned out by her own flame . . . Even sixty years later her beauty, her distinction and her exploits were still legendary in Trinidad: the 'mad Mrs Guppy' who lived in the jungle in a tree house; while even outside the island there were those who remembered her."

== Works ==
- Photographs at Middle Hill by Guppy and Sir Thomas Phillipps, 1846–53
- Photographs of the MS. roll of Homer's Iliad., 1862
- Mrs. Guppy's photographs of charters, seals, & antiquities at Middle Hill.
