= Calliostoma decipiens =

Scientific classification
- Kingdom: Animalia
- Phylum: Mollusca
- Class: Gastropoda
- Subclass: Vetigastropoda
- Order: Trochida
- Family: Calliostomatidae
- Subfamily: Calliostomatinae
- Genus: Calliostoma
- Species: C. decipiens

Binomial name
- Calliostoma decipiens (Guppy, 1867)

Synonyms
- Trochus decipiens Guppy, 1867 (original description)

Species of gastropod

Calliostoma decipiens is a species of sea snail, a marine gastropod mollusk in the family Calliostomatidae.

== Description ==
The shell attains a height of 18 mm.

== Distribution ==
This species occurs in the Caribbean Sea off Venezuela.
