= HMS Stockham =

Frigate of the Royal Navy

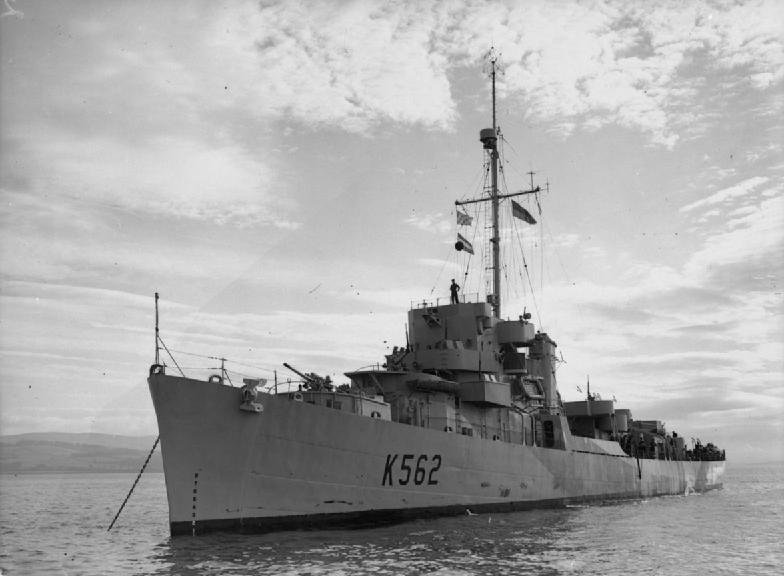
- HMS Stockham anchored at Greenock, Scotland, on 21 March 1944.

History

United States
- Name: unnamed (DE-97)
- Builder: Bethlehem-Hingham Shipyard, Hingham, Massachusetts
- Laid down: 25 August 1943
- Launched: 31 October 1943
- Completed: 28 December 1943
- Fate: Transferred to United Kingdom 28 December 1943
- Acquired: Returned by United Kingdom 31 January 1946
- Stricken: 12 March 1946
- Fate: Scrapping completed 15 June 1948

United Kingdom
- Name: HMS Stockham (K572)
- Namesake: Captain John Stockham (1765–1814), British naval officer who was the commanding officer of HMS Thunderer at the Battle of Trafalgar in 1805
- Acquired: 28 December 1943
- Commissioned: 28 December 1943
- Fate: Returned to United States 31 January 1946

General characteristics
- Displacement: 1,400 long tons (1,422 t)
- Length: 306 ft (93 m)
- Beam: 36.75 ft (11.2 m)
- Draught: 9 ft (2.7 m)
- Propulsion: Two Foster-Wheeler Express "D"-type water-tube boilers; GE 13,500 shp (10,070 kW) steam turbines and generators (9,200 kW); Electric motors for 12,000 shp (8,900 kW); Two shafts
- Speed: 24 knots (44 km/h)
- Range: 5,500 nautical miles (10,200 km) at 15 knots (28 km/h)
- Complement: 186
- Sensors & processing systems: SA & SL type radars; Type 144 series Asdic; MF Direction Finding antenna; HF Direction Finding Type FH 4 antenna
- Armament: 3 × 3 in (76 mm) /50 Mk.22 guns; 1 × twin Bofors 40 mm mount Mk.I; 7–16 × 20 mm Oerlikon guns; Mark 10 Hedgehog antisubmarine mortar; Depth charges; QF 2-pounder naval gun

HMS Stockham (K562) was a British Captain-class frigate of the Royal Navy in commission during World War II. Originally constructed as a United States Navy Buckley class destroyer escort, she served in the Royal Navy from 1943 to 1946.

== Construction and transfer ==
The ship was laid down as the unnamed U.S. Navy destroyer escort DE-97 by Bethlehem-Hingham Shipyard, Inc., in Hingham, Massachusetts, on 25 August 1943 and launched on 31 October 1943. She was transferred to the United Kingdom upon completion on 28 December 1943.

== Service history ==
Commissioned into service in the Royal Navy as the frigate HMS Stockham (K562) on 28 December 1943 simultaneously with her transfer, the ship served on patrol and escort duty in the English Channel for the remainder of World War II. She also participated in the invasion of Normandy in 1944.

The Royal Navy returned Stockham to the U.S. Navy at the Philadelphia Naval Shipyard in Philadelphia, Pennsylvania, on 31 January 1946.

== Disposal ==
The U.S. Navy received authorization on 21 February 1946 to dispose of Stockham and struck her from its Naval Vessel Register on 12 March 1946. She was sold to the Newport News Shipbuilding and Drydock Company of Newport News, Virginia, for scrapping, which was completed on 15 June 1948.
