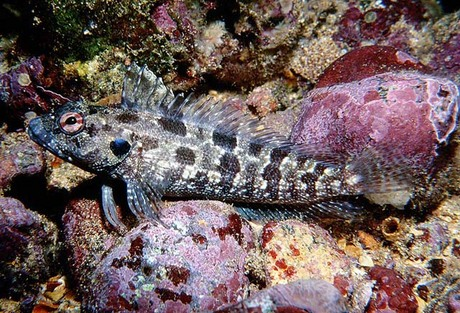
- Female

Conservation status
- Vulnerable (IUCN 3.1)

Scientific classification
- Kingdom: Animalia
- Phylum: Chordata
- Class: Actinopterygii
- Division: Teleostei
- Order: Blenniiformes
- Family: Labrisomidae
- Genus: Gobioclinus
- Species: G. dendriticus

Binomial name
- Gobioclinus dendriticus (Reid, 1935)

Synonyms
- Odontoclinus dendriticus Reid, 1935; Labrisomus dendriticus (Reid, 1935)

= Gobioclinus dendriticus =

Species of fish

Gobioclinus dendriticus, the Bravo clinid, is a species of labrisomid blenny native to the Galapagos Islands and Malpelo Island. It inhabits such habitats as undercuts and ledges on rock wall faces, reefs, and areas with many boulders at depths of from 1 to 23 metres (3.3 to 75.5 ft) though usually no shallower than 6 metres (20 ft) and no deeper than 18 metres (59 ft). This species preys on small fishes and crustaceans. It can reach a length of 13 centimetres (5.1 in) TL.
