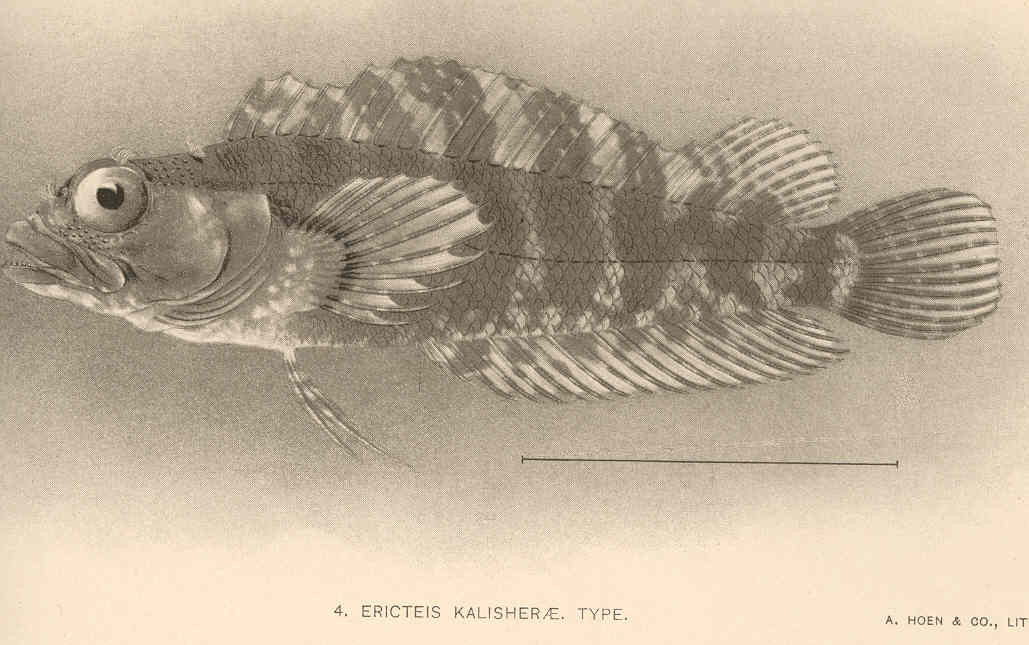

Conservation status
- Least Concern (IUCN 3.1)

Scientific classification
- Kingdom: Animalia
- Phylum: Chordata
- Class: Actinopterygii
- Order: Blenniiformes
- Family: Labrisomidae
- Genus: Gobioclinus
- Species: G. kalisherae

Binomial name
- Gobioclinus kalisherae (D. S. Jordan, 1904)

Synonyms
- Ericteis kalisherae D. S. Jordan, 1904; Labrisomus kalisherae (D.S. Jordan, 1904)

= Gobioclinus kalisherae =

Species of fish

Gobioclinus kalisherae, the downy blenny, is a species of labrisomid blenny native to the western Atlantic Ocean from south Florida to Brazil.

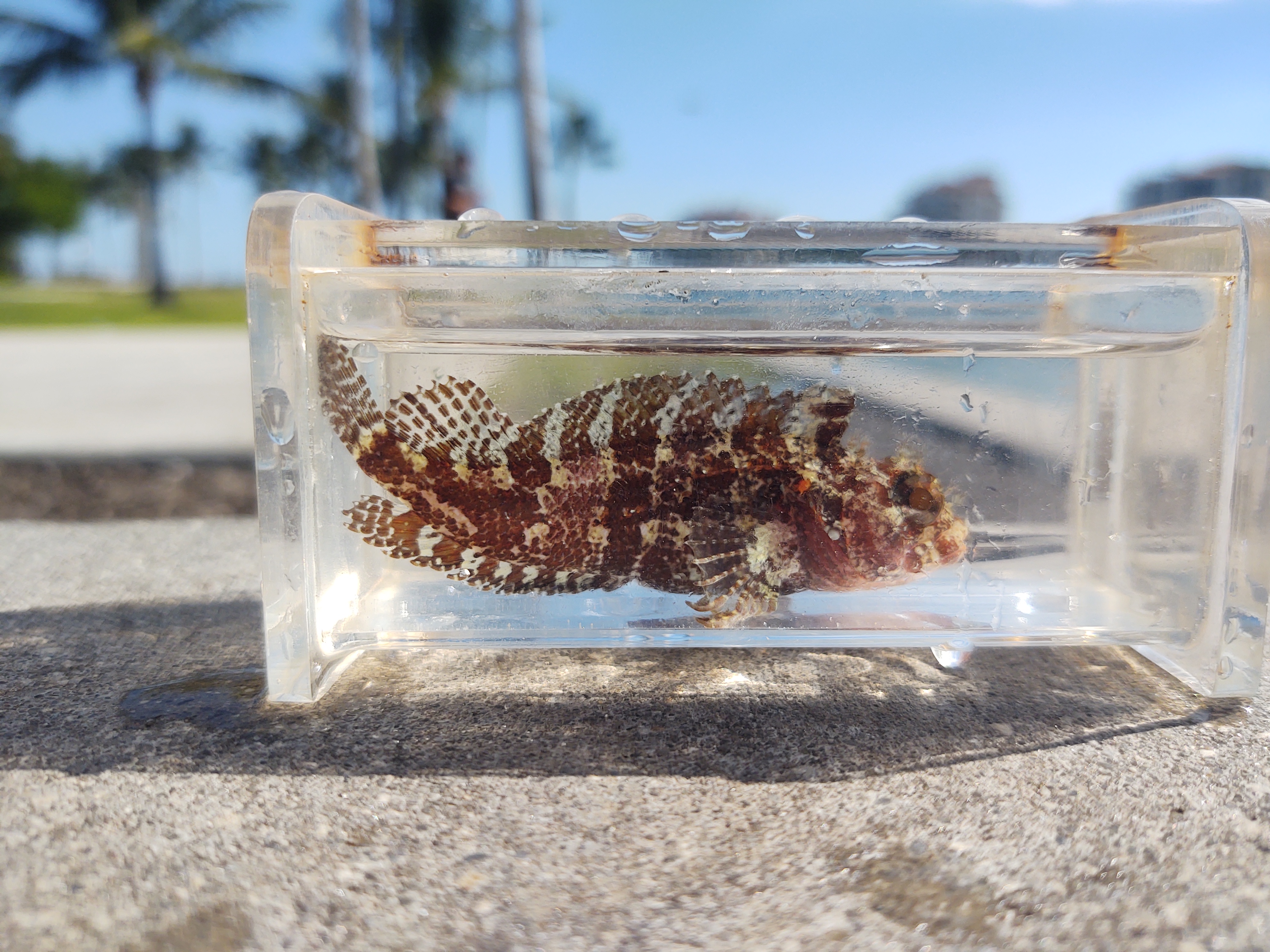
A downy blenny caught in Miami, Florida (October 20, 2023).

This species prefers habitats which provide crevices or holes to hide in such as areas of rubble or rock and coral reefs. It can reach a length of 7.5 centimetres (3.0 in) TL. It can also be found in the aquarium trade. The specific name honours the painter Emilia Kalisher (1868-1959), at the request of her future husband Joseph Cheesman Thompson (1874-1943).
