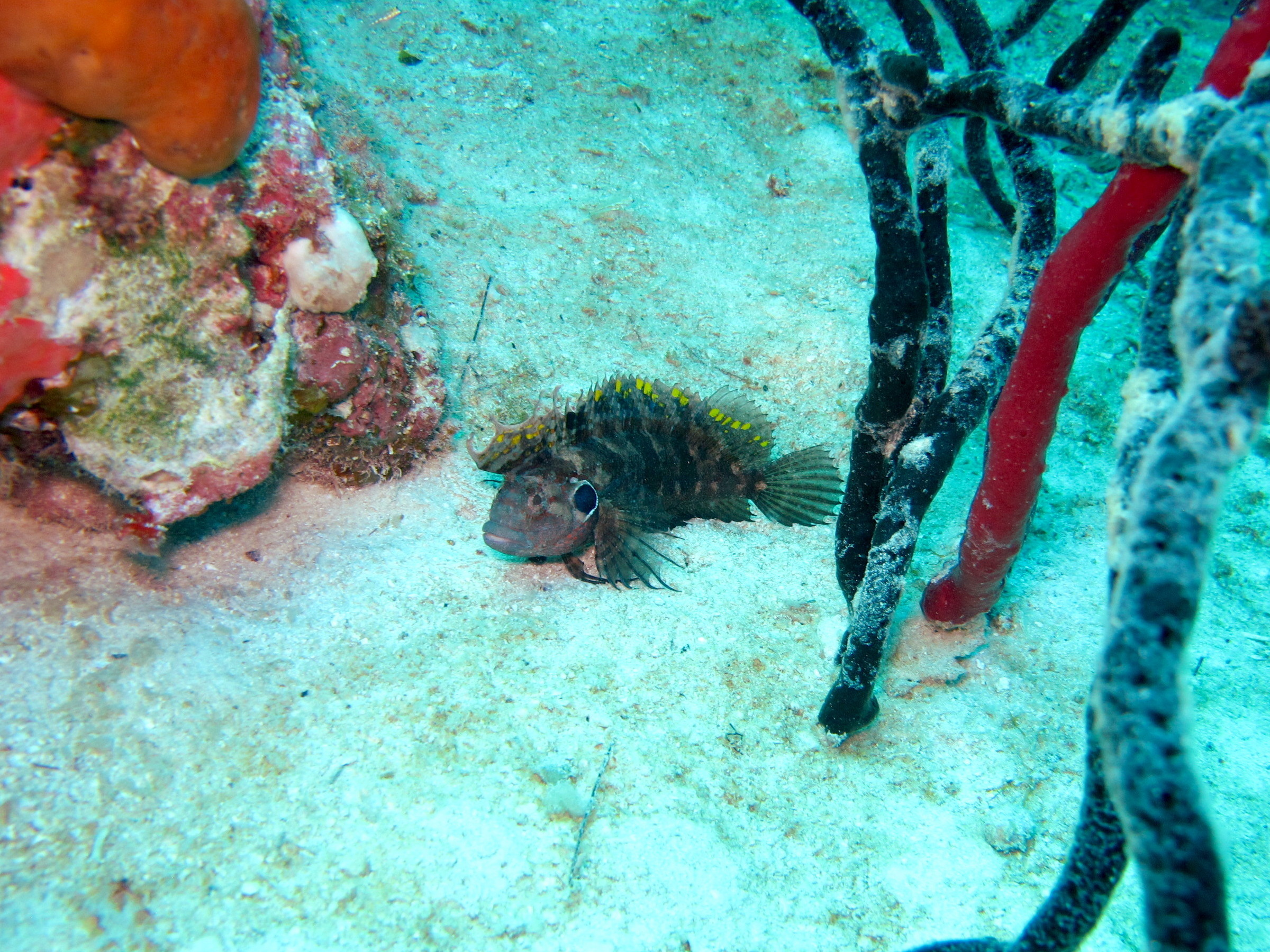

Conservation status
- Least Concern (IUCN 3.1)

Scientific classification
- Kingdom: Animalia
- Phylum: Chordata
- Class: Actinopterygii
- Order: Blenniiformes
- Family: Labrisomidae
- Genus: Gobioclinus
- Species: G. filamentosus

Binomial name
- Gobioclinus filamentosus (V. G. Springer, 1960)

Synonyms
- Labrisomus filamentosus Springer, 1960

= Gobioclinus filamentosus =

Species of fish

Gobioclinus filamentosus, the Quillfin blenny, is a species of labrisomid blenny native to the Caribbean Sea where they can be found on reefs with substantial algal growth. It prefers deeper reefs at depths of from 12 to 35 metres (39 to 115 ft). This species can reach a length of 12 centimetres (4.7 in) TL.
