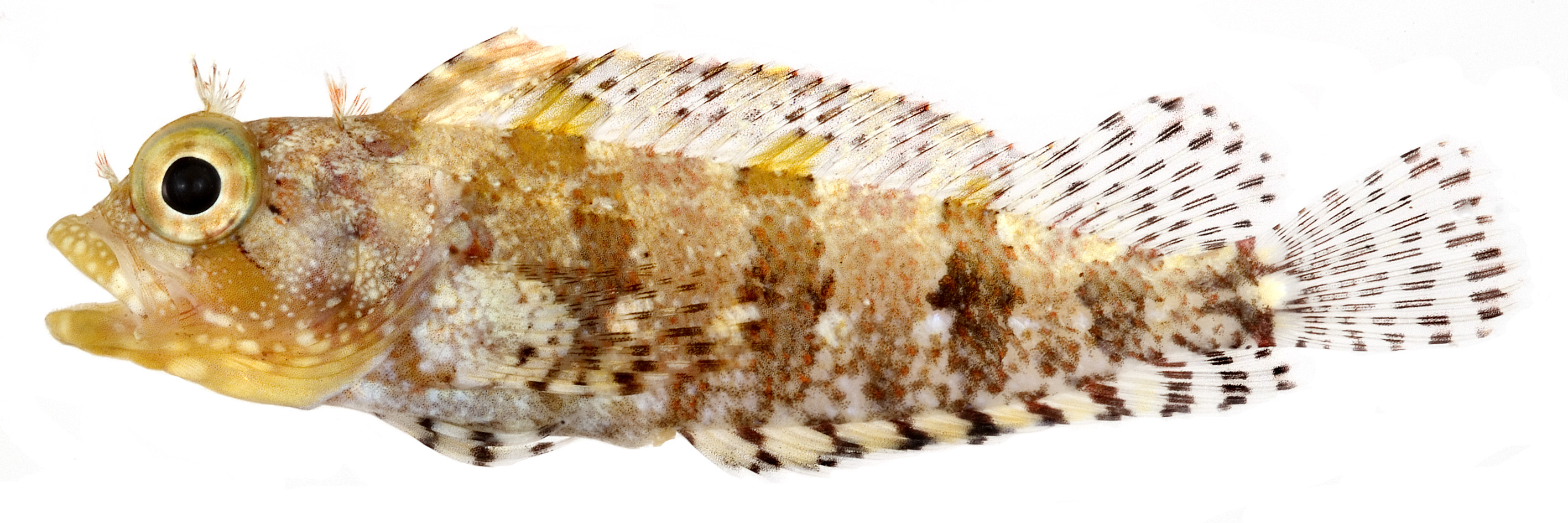

Conservation status
- Least Concern (IUCN 3.1)

Scientific classification
- Kingdom: Animalia
- Phylum: Chordata
- Class: Actinopterygii
- Order: Blenniiformes
- Family: Labrisomidae
- Genus: Gobioclinus
- Species: G. bucciferus

Binomial name
- Gobioclinus bucciferus (Poey, 1868)

Synonyms
- Labrisomus bucciferus Poey, 1868

= Gobioclinus bucciferus =

Species of fish

Gobioclinus bucciferus, the Puffcheek blenny, is a species of labrisomid blenny native to the western Atlantic Ocean and the Caribbean Sea. It can be found on reefs, seagrass beds and in algal mats along rubble or rocky shores down to a depth of 5 metres (16 ft). This species can reach a length of 9 centimetres (3.5 in) TL. This species can also be found in the aquarium trade.
