= Shusha Guppy =

Writer, editor and singer (1935–2008)

Shushā Guppy
- شوشا گوپی
- Born: Shamsi Assār; 24 December 1935; Tehran, Iran
- Died: 21 March 2008 (aged 72); London, England
- Other name: Shusha
- Occupations: Singer, writer, editor
- Years active: 1971–2008
- Known for: Persian traditional music, chanson, singer-songwriter, memoirist, editor
- Spouse: Nicholas Guppy (1962-1976)
- Children: 2
- Awards: Winifred Holtby Memorial Prize; Grand prix des lectrices de Elle

Shushā Guppy (Persian: شوشا گوپی; née Shamsi Assār (Note: The name Shamsi (Persian: شمسی) is an attributive adjective, referring to the word Shams, the Sun, and may be interpreted as of or pertaining to the Sun. According to Dehkhoda, Assār (Persian: عصار) has two distinct meanings. The first refers to the professions dealing with pressing grapes or pressing oil-seeds; thus Assār is one who holds one of these professions. In this sense, the word Assār has its root in the word Osāreh, which means Juice or Ooze. The second interpretation is King and Refuge, in the meaning of one who provides shelter. In this second sense, Assār has also been used as a collective name. (Based on information gleaned from Loghat'nāmeh-ye Dehkhoda.)) (Persian: شمسی عصار; 24 December 1935 – 21 March 2008) was a writer, editor and a singer of Persian and Western folk songs. She lived in London from the early 1960s, until her death in 2008.

== Early life ==
Her father, Sayyed Mohammad-Kāzem Assār, was a Shia theologian and Professor of Philosophy at University of Tehran. At age 16 in 1951, Shusha was sent to Paris, where she studied French Literature and philosophy at the Sorbonne, and also trained as an opera singer. In Paris she encountered artists, writers and poets such as Louis Aragon, José Bergamín, Jean-Paul Sartre and Albert Camus. She was encouraged by Jacques Prévert to record an album of Persian folk songs.

She married British writer, explorer, and art collector Nicholas Guppy in 1961. The couple had two sons, Darius and Constantine, but divorced in 1976. At the time of her marriage, she moved to London, where she became fluent in English; she was already fluent in Persian and French. Guppy wrote articles for major publications in both Britain and the United States. She also began singing and acting professionally.

== Singer ==
Guppy's first British release, in 1971, was an album of traditional Persian music, complementing her first album released in France fourteen years earlier.

By now, influenced by the Folk Revival, she was writing and singing some of her own songs, as well as covering the works of many contemporary singer-songwriters. She gave successful concerts in Britain, America and continental Europe, and appeared on television and radio programmes.

She gave concerts in the Netherlands and Belgium in 1975 with Lori Lieberman and Dimitri van Toren.

She contributed music (in collaboration with G.T. Moore) and narrated the 1973 documentary film Bakhtiari Migration – The sheep must live, which, in 1976, was more than doubled in length and her narration replaced by James Mason. It was released as People of the Wind. The following year the film was nominated for the Best Documentary Feature Oscar and also for a Golden Globe. The film follows the annual migration of the nomadic Bakhtiari tribes in southern Iran. The soundtrack was later released in the USA. How much she contributed to the film is in dispute.

According to Shusha Guppy herself: "What has saddened me, and frankly made me angry, is not the money — as I said I wanted to make the film and financial rewards were not my aim — but the fact that all the credits were taken from me on People of the Wind of which the idea, the production, and the text were mine."

== Discography ==
All are vinyl LPs except where noted. The years given are for the first release.

- Chansons d'Amour Persanes (7-inch EP 1957)
- Persian Love Songs and Mystic Chants (1971)
- Song of Long-time Lovers (1972)
- Shusha (1974)
- This is the Day (1974)
- Before the Deluge (1975)
- People of the Wind (1977)
- From East to West (1978)
- Here I Love You (1980)
- La Fortune (1980 – cassette)
- Lovely in the Dances: Songs of Sydney Carter (1981)
- Durable Fire (1983)
- Strange Affair (1986)
- Refugee (1995 – CD on Sharrow Records)
- Shusha / This is the Day (2001 – reissue on CD)

== Writer and editor ==
Guppy promoted Persian culture and history, and was a political commentator on relations between the West and the Islamic world. Guppy's first book, The Blindfold Horse: Memoirs of a Persian Childhood, was published in 1988. It was highly praised, winning the Yorkshire Post Prize from the Royal Society of Literature, the Winifred Holtby Memorial Prize, and the Grand prix des lectrices de Elle.

The book describes a Persia before the excesses of Shah Reza Pahlavi led to his overthrow, describing a country with an Islamic way of life without dogmatism or fanaticism. Her last book, The Secret of Laughter (2005), is a collection of Persian fairy tales from Iran's oral tradition. Many had never previously been published in written form. For twenty years, until 2005, she was the London editor of the American literary journal The Paris Review.

== Bibliography ==
- The Blindfold Horse: Memories of a Persian Childhood, William Heinemann Ltd, 1988, ISBN 978-0-434-30850-7; I B Tauris & Co Ltd, 2004, ISBN 978-1-85043-401-6.
- Journeys in Persia and Kurdistan: Vol 2, by Isabella L. Bird with introduction by Shusha Guppy, Virago Press, 1989, ISBN 978-1-85381-055-8.
- A Girl in Paris, William Heinemann Ltd, 1991, ISBN 978-0-434-30852-1; I B Tauris & Co Ltd, 2007, ISBN 978-1-84511-380-3.
- Looking Back: A Panoramic View of a Literary Age by the Grandes Dames of European Letters, with introduction by Anita Brookner, Simon & Schuster Ltd, 1992, ISBN 978-0-945167-30-3.
- On the Death of a Parent, Shusha Guppy et al., ed. Jane McLoughlin, Virago Press, 1994, ISBN 978-1-85381-803-5.
- One Thousand and One Persian-English Proverbs, eds. Simin Habibian, Shusha Guppy et al. Ibex Publishing, 1995, ISBN 978-1-588140-21-0.
- Three Journeys in the Levant: Jordan, Syria, Lebanon, Starhaven, 2001, ISBN 978-0-936315-17-1.
- The Secret of Laughter: Magical Tales from Classical Persia, I B Tauris & Co Ltd, 2005, ISBN 978-1-85043-427-6.

== See also ==
- Music of Iran
- List of Iranian musicians
- List of Iranian women musicians
