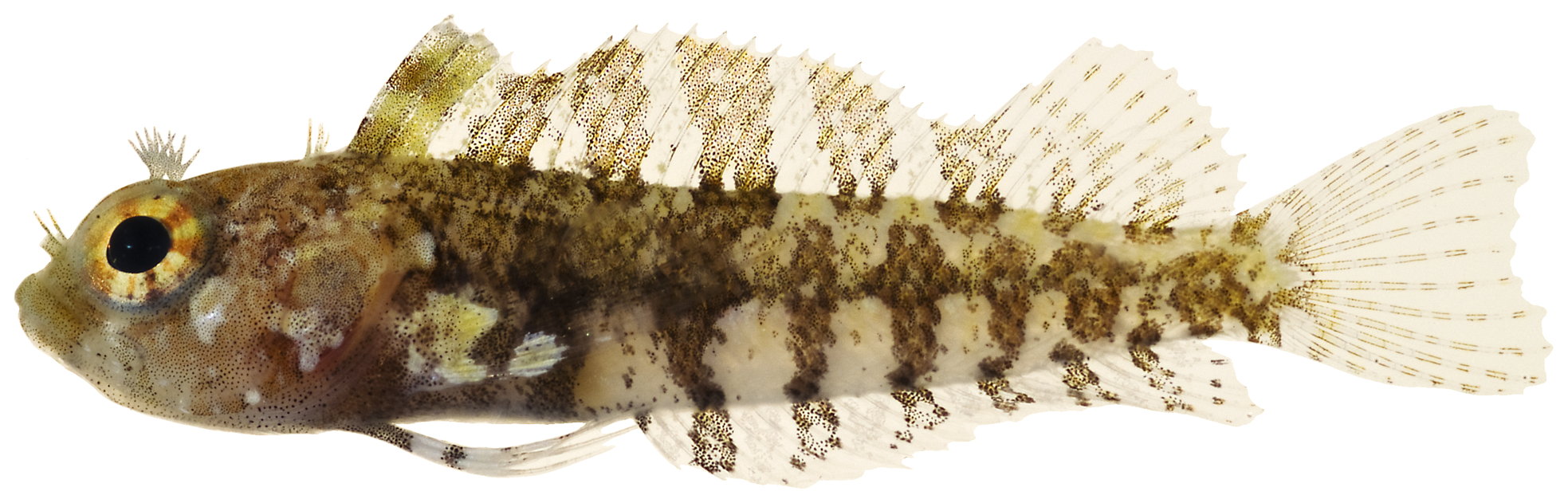

Conservation status
- Least Concern (IUCN 3.1)

Scientific classification
- Kingdom: Animalia
- Phylum: Chordata
- Class: Actinopterygii
- Order: Blenniiformes
- Family: Labrisomidae
- Genus: Gobioclinus
- Species: G. haitiensis

Binomial name
- Gobioclinus haitiensis (Beebe & Tee-Van, 1928)

Synonyms
- Labrisomus haitiensis Beebe & Tee-Van, 1928

= Gobioclinus haitiensis =

Species of fish

Gobioclinus haitiensis, the longfin blenny, is a species of labrisomid blenny native to the western Atlantic Ocean including the Gulf of Mexico and the Caribbean Sea. This species inhabits such habitats as reefs, beds of seagrass and near shore rocky or rubble substrates with plentiful algal growth. This species can reach a length of 7.5 centimetres (3.0 in) TL. It can also be found in the aquarium trade.
