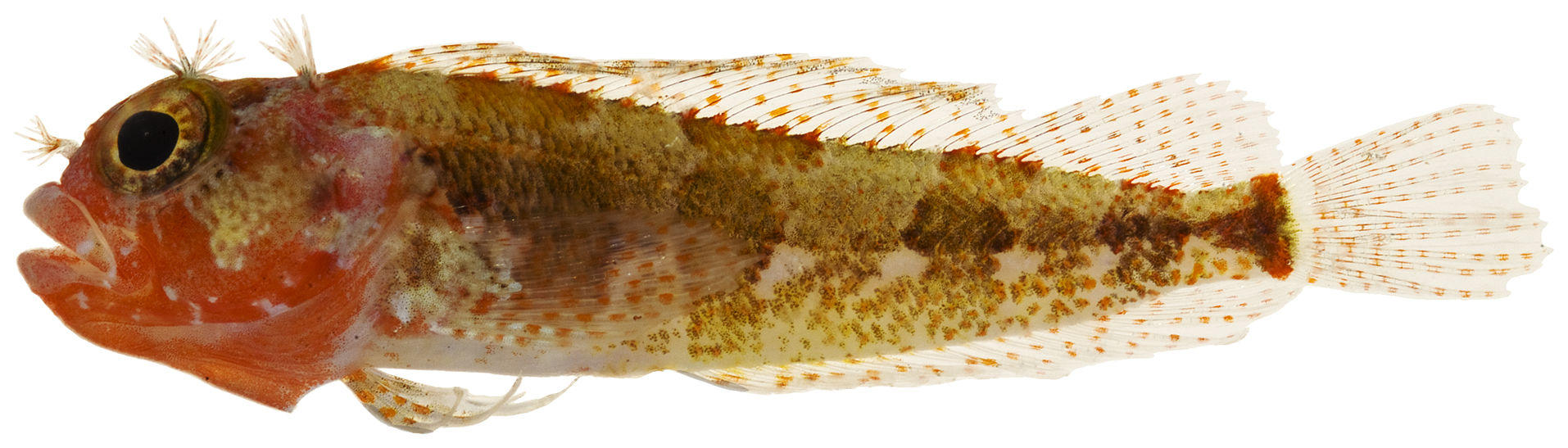
- Gobioclinus gobio

Scientific classification
- Kingdom: Animalia
- Phylum: Chordata
- Class: Actinopterygii
- Order: Blenniiformes
- Family: Labrisomidae
- Genus: Gobioclinus; Gill, 1860

Type species
- Clinus gobio Valenciennes 1836

Synonyms
- Ericteis D.S. Jordan, 1904; Odontoclinus E.D. Reid, 1935

= Gobioclinus =

Genus of fishes

Gobioclinus is a genus of labrisomid blennies from the coasts of the western Atlantic and eastern Pacific Oceans off the Americas.

== Species ==
The following species are classified within the genus Gobioclinus:

- Gobioclinus bucciferus (Poey, 1868) (Puffcheek blenny)
- Gobioclinus dendriticus (Reid, 1935) (Bravo clinid)
- Gobioclinus filamentosus (Springer, 1960) (Quillfin blenny)
- Gobioclinus gobio (Valenciennes, 1836) (Palehead blenny)
- Gobioclinus guppyi (Norman, 1922) (Mimic blenny)
- Gobioclinus haitiensis (Beebe & Tee-Van, 1928) (Longfin blenny)
- Gobioclinus kalisherae (D.S. Jordan, 1904) (Downy blenny)
