= Yseult Bridges =

- Born: Yseult Alice Mary Lechmere Guppy; April 20, 1888; Port of Spain, Trinidad and Tobago
- Died: April 2, 1971 (aged 82); Rye, East Sussex, United Kingdom
- Other name: Yseult Alice Mary Lechmere Low
- Occupation: writer
- Spouse: Alfred Moore Low (married 1906–1928) Michael Bridges (married 1932)
- Children: 2
- Father: Lechmere Guppy
- Relatives: Nicholas Guppy (nephew)

Yseult Bridges (20 April 1888 – 2 April 1971), born Yseult Alice Mary Lechmere Guppy, was a Trinidad and Tobago-born British memoirist, novelist and crime writer best known for memoir Child of the Tropics.

== Early life and education ==
Yseult Guppy was born at 26 Queens Park West, in Port of Spain on 20 April 1888. She was the daughter of Lechmere Guppy, a British-born naturalist (after whom the guppy is named) and Alice (née Rostant), the who belonged to a local white family. Historian Bridget Brereton describes Alice Guppy was a "domestic tyrant" who was "obsessively critical" of her domestic staff.

The house she was born in was a single-story dwelling raised off the ground on stone pillars, and was located in the most desirable neighbourhood in Port of Spain. It faced the Queen's Park Savannah and looked north toward the Governor's House. After the death of her grandfather, Robert Guppy, in November 1894, the family moved to another house nearby after the arrival of a new family in the house next door proved too noisy for Lechmere Guppy. A few years later Lechmere Guppy purchased a cocoa estate called Glenside in eastern Trinidad, near Tunapuna, and the family relocated to the plantation.

At about the age of 14 she was sent to England for schooling.

== Marriage ==
After returning to Trinidad and Tobago, Guppy married Alfred Moore Low, who was later the principal of Queen's Royal College in Port of Spain, in 1906. She was eighteen, while Low was "considerably older" according to Brereton. Guppy and Low had two daughters and divorced in 1928. In 1932 she married Charles Bridges, who worked for the Colonial Service in Nigeria.

== Career ==
She wrote a weekly column for the Trinidad Guardian during her marriage to Low; according to Jak Peake, while the precise dates of her employment at the Guardian are not known, she may have overlapped with Seepersad Naipaul, father of novelist V.S. Naipaul.

In 1934, Yseult Bridges published her first novel, Questing Heart, under the pen name Tristram Hill. She published second novel, Creole Enchantment in 1936, also under the name Tristram Hill. She also wrote a monograph about the "history, mythology, laws, and customs" of the Yoruba people, but the only copy of it was destroyed during World War II.

After her husband Charles retired and the couple moved to Britain, Bridges became a crime writer.

== Later life ==
After Charles Bridges retired from the Colonial Service, Yseult and Charles relocated to Britain.

Bridges died after a fall at her home in Rye on 2 April 1971.

== Works ==
=== Questing Heart and Creole Enchantment ===
Questing Heart tells the story of Christine Bennett an English-born woman to migrated to British-ruled Trinidad with her parents as a child. She is orphaned when her parents die from a sudden illness, and ends up as a live-in servant for Mrs Davies, a mixed-race woman. Mrs Davies is verbally abusive, and her daughters treat Christine with "contempt and rudeness". After Mrs Davies son, Harry, sexually assaults Christine, she flees the house.

Left homeless, Christine is rescued by Tom Carter, a wealthy white businessman who offers her a place to stay with Lizzie Hodges, his children's former nanny. Hodges is Black and "belongs to the servant class", and despite being a boarder in Hodges' home, "Christine assumes the role of mistress" according to Peake, while Hodges becomes the subaltern. But the neighbourhood where Hodges lives is judged unsuitable for a white woman by Carter, so he moves her to a bungalow in Maraval.

Creole Enchantment focuses on two couples — Clive Connor, a Trinidadian creole, and Vanda Wayne, the daughter of a colonial officer, and David Lane, an English businessman, and Iris Finucane, the wife of a Trinidadian creole.

=== Child of the Tropics ===
Child of the Tropics was Bridges memoir of her childhood in Trinidad and Tobago. The book begins with Bridges earliest memories — waking in her nurse's lap beneath the saman tree (Samanea saman) in the garden of her parents home in Port of Spain — to the end of her childhood as the ship taking her to England passes through the Bocas del Dragón and leaves the Gulf of Paria.

She began work on the book in the 1940s during World War II while her husband was stationed in Nigeria. She worked on it for the remainder of her life, but never attempted to publish it, considering the work both too personal and too unfinished, according to her nephew Nicholas Guppy who completed and edited the book.

According to Michael Nimblett, the book "displays a pungent nostalgia for the plantation landscapes (and colonial power relations) of her youth".

== Style and themes ==
In the opening note in both of her novels, Bridges informs readers that she is using the term creole "in its true sense" to denote someone "born in the West Indies but of pure EUROPEAN [sic] descent" (Note: Peake (2017) notes that Bridges uses "pure EUROPEAN" in Questing Heart and pure European (in italics) in Creole Enchantment.) Peake sees this as highlighting a "glaring insecurity" on Bridges' part about the fact that white creoles "may contain an iota of non-European blood" as a consequence of their close associations enslaved Africans and their descendants in the plantation system in the West Indies.

== Impact and legacy ==
Bridges is best known for Child of the Tropics, and literary critic Jak Peake describes Bridges as " a woman writer sorely neglected in literary criticism on Trinidad". Until Peake's examination of her work in Beyond the Bocas, her novels Questing Heart and Creole Enchantment had received little attention in Trinidad and Tobago literature. (Note: Peake (2017) noted that the only treatment he was aware of was Jennifer Rahim's 1992 Ph.D thesis “Rising into Artistry and Personhood: Trinidad and Tobago Women’s Literature 1900–1990") He attributes this both to her connection to the "expatriate class", her gender, and her conservatism (relative to her contemporary Trinidadian authors), exacerbated by the fact that she published them under the pseudonym Tristram Hill.

Peake also asks whether Bridges work was ignored because of an "enthusiastically racist agenda" that made it "politically expedient to avoid". In his review of Peake's book, Kenneth Ramchand disagrees with Peake, saying Bridges' works were not ignored "because she was a woman, or white, or too racist" rather because she published them under a pseudonym, and her books were simply not well known.

== Bibliography ==
=== Novels ===
- Hill, Tristram [Yseult Bridges] (1934). Questing Heart. London: Eldon Press.
- Hill, Tristram [Yseult Bridges] (1936). Creole Enchantment. London: Geoffrey Bles.

=== Crime writing ===
- Bridges, Yseult (1954). Saint-with Red Hands?. London: Macmillan.
- Bridges, Yseult (1957). How Charles Bravo Died. London: Macmillan.
- Bridges, Yseult (1959). Two Studies in Crime. London: Hutchinson.
- Bridges, Yseult (1962). Poison and Adelaide Bartlett. London: Macmillan.

=== Memoir ===
- Bridges, Yseult (1980). Guppy, Nicholas (ed.). Child of the tropics : Victorian memoirs. Port of Spain: Aquarela Galleries. ISBN 976-8066-05-9.
