= Thomas Phillipps =

English antiquary and book collector (1792–1872)

Sir Thomas Phillipps, Bt
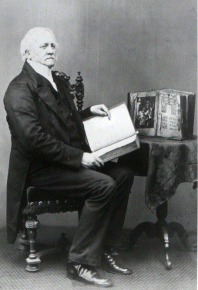
- Portrait of Sir Thomas Phillipps, c. 1860
- Born: 2 July 1792; Manchester, England
- Died: 6 February 1872 (aged 79); Thirlestaine House, Cheltenham
- Resting place: Church of St Eadburgha, Broadway, Worcestershire
- Education: University College, Oxford
- Occupations: Antiquarian; book collector
- Relatives: James Halliwell-Phillipps (son-in-law)

Signature
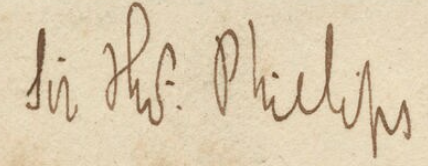

Sir Thomas Phillipps, 1st Baronet (2 July 1792 – 6 February 1872), was an English antiquary and book collector who amassed the largest collection of manuscript material in the 19th century. He was an illegitimate son of a textile manufacturer and inherited a substantial estate, which he spent almost entirely on vellum manuscripts and, when out of funds, borrowed heavily to buy manuscripts, thereby putting his family deep into debt. Phillipps recorded in an early catalogue that his collection was instigated by reading various accounts of the destruction of valuable manuscripts. Such was his devotion that he acquired some 40,000 printed books and 60,000 manuscripts, arguably the largest collection a single individual has created, and coined the term "vello-maniac" to describe his obsession, which is more commonly termed bibliomania.

== The Collection ==
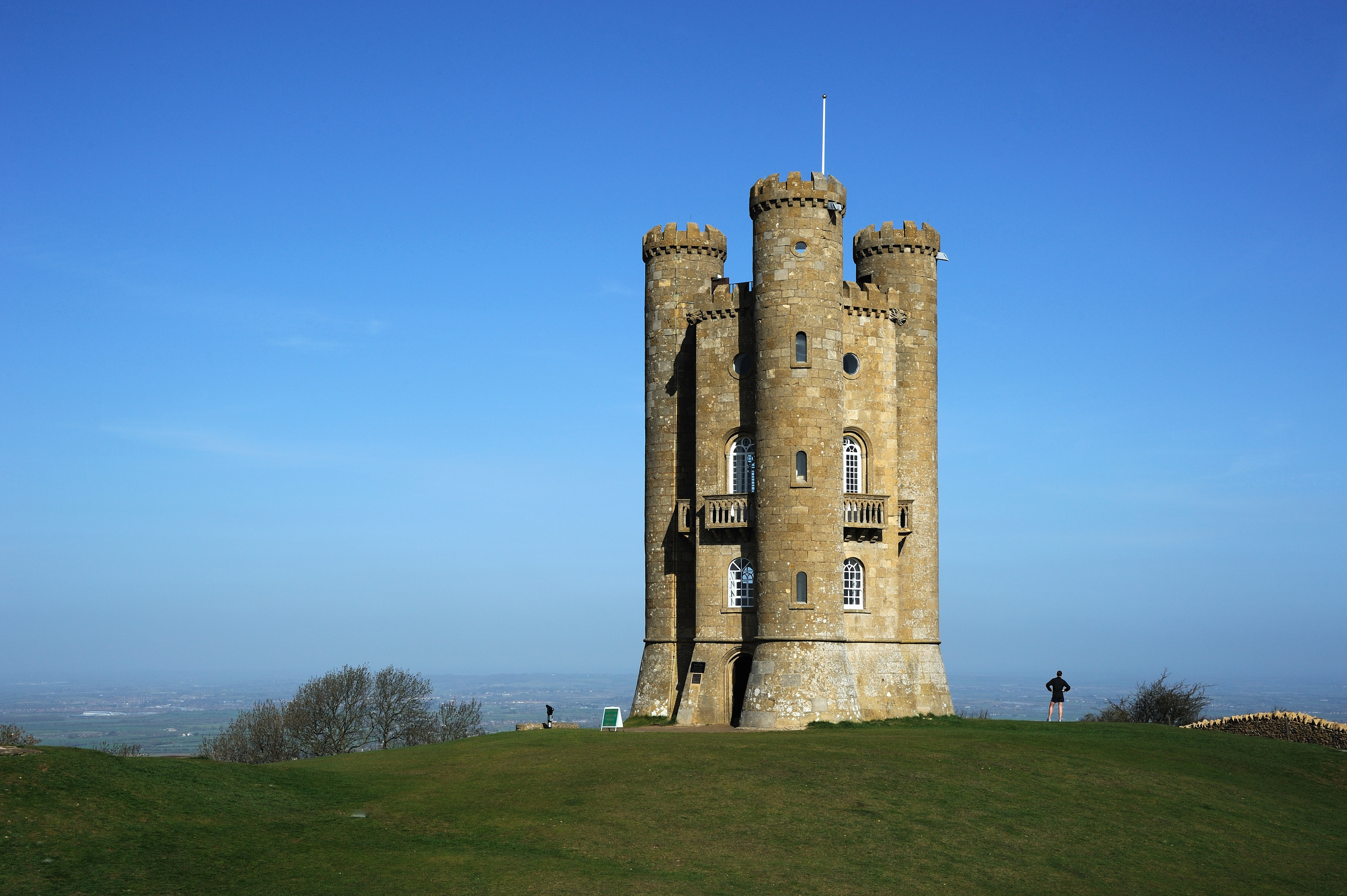
Broadway Tower, Worcestershire. The home of Phillipps' Middle Hill Press

In 1808, when Phillipps was 16 years old, he already owned 112 books (largely Gothic chapbooks). Later in life he is recorded to have said that he wanted to own one of every book in the world. Philipps began collecting in earnest while still at Rugby, and his manuscript catalogue from 1811, now at the Grolier Club, shows a turn in his collecting from 1808. He continued buying books when he went on to University College, Oxford and graduated in 1815. In 1820, he was elected a Fellow of the Royal Society.

A. N. L. Munby notes that, "[Phillipps] spent perhaps between two hundred thousand and a quarter of a million pounds[,] altogether four or five thousand pounds a year, while accessions came in at the rate of forty or fifty a week.". Phillipps would go into bookshops and purchase the entire stock; he would receive dealers' catalogues and buy all the listings; his agents bought entire lots of books at auction, outbidding his rival the British Museum. His country seat, Middle Hill near Broadway, Worcestershire, gave over sixteen of twenty rooms to books. After Sir Frederic Madden, the keeper of manuscripts of the British Museum, visited the house, he wrote in his diary:

The house looks more miserable and dilapidated every time I visit it, and there is not a room now that is not crowded with large boxes full of MSS. The state of things is really inconceivable. Lady P is absent, and were I in her place, I would never return to so wretched an abode. . . . Every room is filled with heaps of papers, MSS, books, charters, packages & other things, lying in heaps under your feet, piled upon tables, beds, chairs, ladders &c.&c. and in every room, piles of huge boxes, up to the ceiling, containing the more valuable volumes! It is quite sickening...The windows of the house are never opened, and the close confined air & smell of the paper & MSS is almost unbearable.

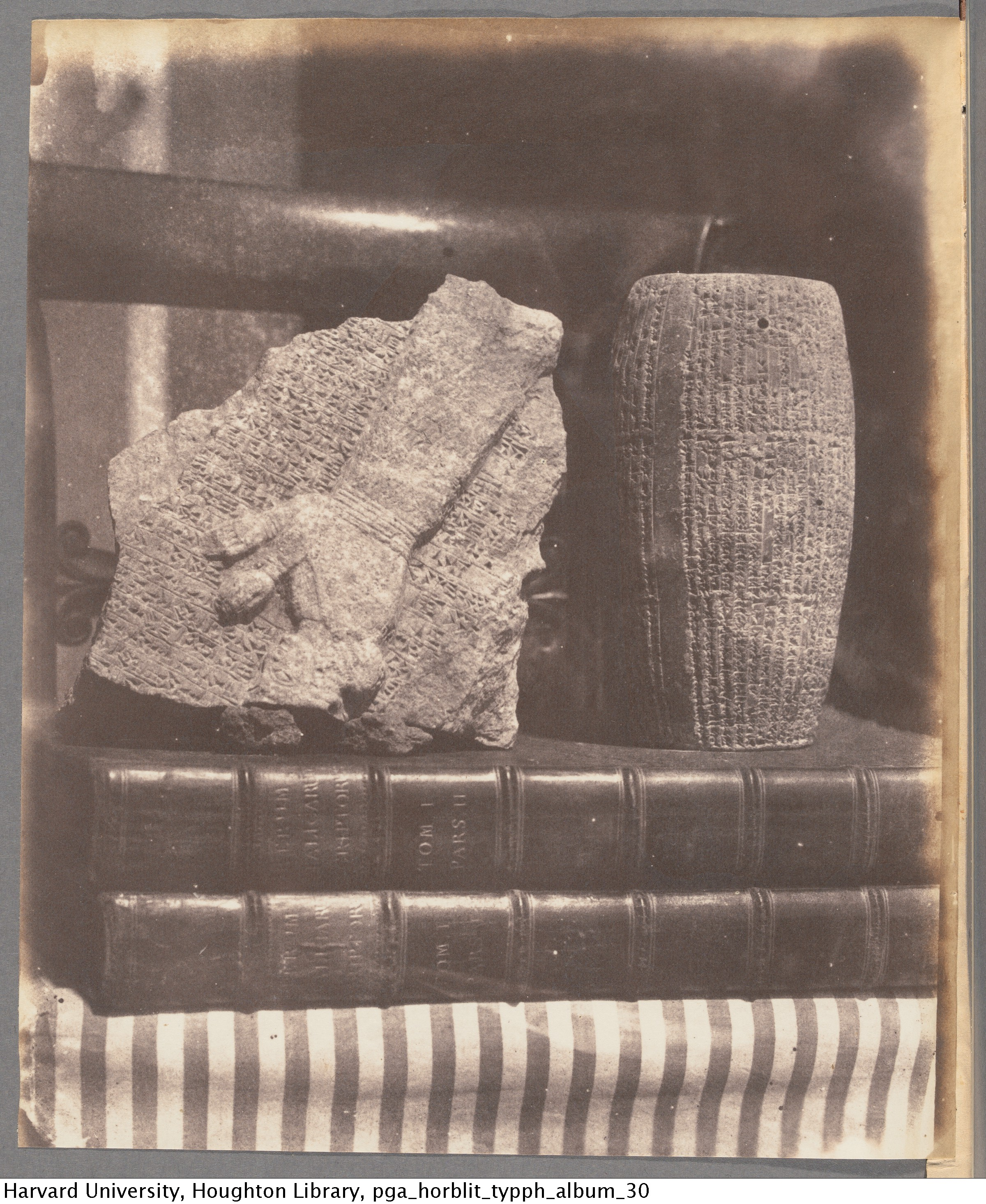
Still life with ancient Babylonian artefacts on books, salted paper print, 1853, by Amelia Elizabeth Guppy

In 1850, at a meeting of the Cambrian Archaeological society (Cymdeithas Hynafiaethau Cymru), Phillips announced that he was seeking to locate his large collection at a location in Wales. He employed a distant relative by marriage, Amelia Elizabeth Guppy, to photograph some of his collection in 1853 including artefacts from Babylon and Utrecht.

In 1863, Phillipps began to move the collection as he was fearful that his son-in-law, James Orchard Halliwell, would gain ownership of it when Phillipps's estranged daughter inherited Middle Hill. Halliwell was suspected of having stolen some manuscripts from Trinity College, Cambridge (something he denied), and Phillips also accused Halliwell of stealing his 1603 copy of Hamlet, which he (Halliwell) sold to the British Museum minus the title page containing Phillipps' book stamp. Halliwell also routinely cut pages out of valuable books, to stick in his scrapbook.

At least 105 wagon-loads, each drawn by two horses and accompanied by one or two men, were used to move the collection to Thirlestaine House in Cheltenham over a period of eight months, leaving Middle Hill to fall to ruin. The previous owner of Thirlestaine House was John Rushout, 2nd Baron Northwick, whose important art collection had been sold in 1859 after he died intestate. There are thus numerous MSS named "Codex Middlehillianus", "Cheltenham Codex" or "Codex Cheltenhamensis".

== Legacy ==
After Phillipps died in 1872, the probate valuation, made by Edward Bond of the British Museum, of his manuscripts was £74,779 17s 0d. His success as a collector owed something to the dispersal of the monastic libraries following the French Revolution and the relative cheapness of a large amount of vellum material, in particular English legal documents, many of which owe their survival to Phillipps. He was an assiduous cataloguer who established the Middle Hill Press (Typis Medio-Montanis) in 1822 not only to record his book holdings but also to publish his findings in English topography and genealogy. The press was housed in Broadway Tower, a folly completed on Broadway Hill, Worcestershire, in 1798.

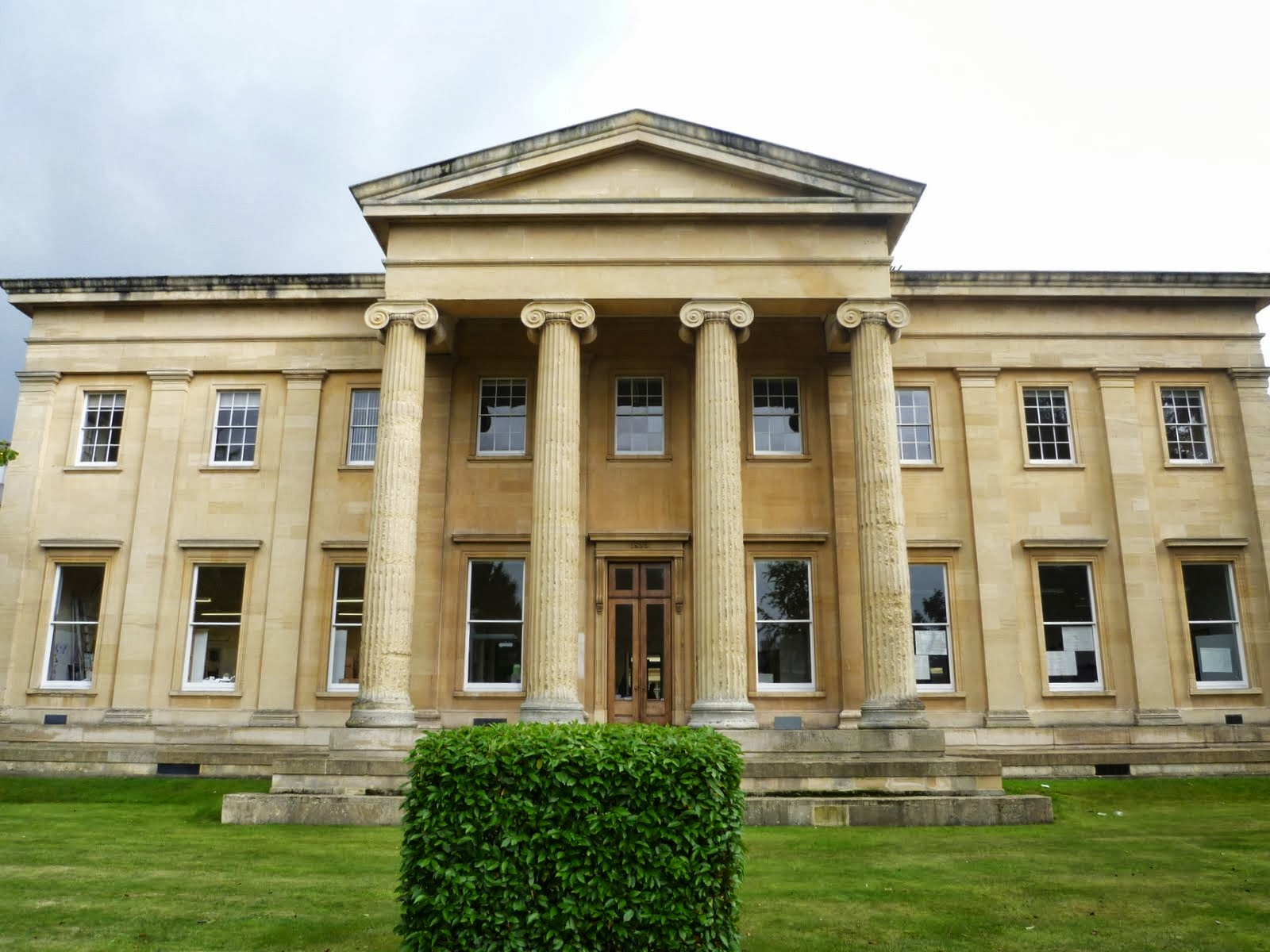
Thirlestaine House, Phillipps' home during the latter part of his life

During his lifetime, Phillipps attempted to turn over his collection to the British nation and corresponded with the then-Chancellor of the Exchequer Disraeli so that it should be acquired for the British Museum. Negotiations proved unsuccessful and, ultimately, the dispersal of his collection took over 100 years.

Phillipps's will stipulated that his books should remain intact at Thirlestaine House, that no bookseller or stranger should rearrange them and that no Roman Catholic, especially his son-in-law James Halliwell, should be permitted to view them.

In 1885, the Court of Chancery declared this too restrictive and thus made possible the sale of the library which Phillipps's grandson, Thomas FitzRoy Fenwick, supervised for the next fifty years. Significant portions of the European material were sold to the national collections on the continent including the Royal Library, Berlin, the Royal Library of Belgium, and the Provincial Archives (:nl:Gemeentearchief) in Utrecht as well as the sale of outstanding individual items to the J. Pierpont Morgan and Henry E. Huntington libraries. By 1946, what was known as the "residue" was sold to London booksellers Phillip and Lionel Robinson for £100,000, though this part of the collection was uncatalogued and unexamined. The Robinsons endeavoured to sell these books through their own published catalogues and a number of Sotheby's sales. The final portion of the collection was sold by Christie's on 7 June 2006, lots 18–38. A five-volume history of the collection and its dispersal, Phillipps Studies, by A. N. L. Munby was published between 1951 and 1960.

== Family ==
Phillipps married Henrietta Elizabeth Molyneux, daughter of Major-General Thomas Molyneux, in 1819. This was after the death of his father, who had opposed the match because she lacked a dowry.

Escutcheon of the Phillipps baronets of Middle Hill

In 1821, he was made baronet of Middle Hill in the County of Worcester at the age of 29. The honour was the result of his father-in-law's connections with the Duke of Beaufort. He was appointed High Sheriff of Worcestershire in 1825.

Phillipps' eldest daughter, Harriett, married the Shakesperean scholar James Orchard Halliwell. While still an undergraduate at Cambridge, Halliwell had collaborated in research with Phillipps. He came to visit Thomas Phillipps in February 1842 and became attached to Harriett. Phillipps refused to allow his daughter to marry and the couple eloped. Phillipps was enraged by this and maintained a lifelong vendetta against the couple.

As the Phillippses had only daughters the title became extinct on his death in February 1872, aged 79. He was buried at the Church of St Eadburgha in Broadway.

== Items from the Phillipps Collection ==
- Rochefoucauld Grail

== Portrayals ==
In 2006, Phillipps was played by Benjamin Withrow in Every Book in the World, an audio drama about the transfer of his collection to Thirlestaine House written by Nick Warburton and broadcast on BBC Radio 4.

== Notes ==
Citations

Sources and bibliography

- Nicholas A. Basbanes: A Gentle Madness, St Martin's Press Edition, Manhattan, New York City, 1995 and 1999, 958 p.ISBN 9780805061765: . Retrieved 30 April 2020.
- "Phillipps, Sir Thomas, baronet (1792–1872)". Oxford Dictionary of National Biography (online ed.). Oxford University Press. doi:10.1093/ref:odnb/22143. (Subscription, Wikipedia Library access or UK public library membership required.)
- A.N.L.Munby: Phillipps Studies, 5 vols. 1951–1960.
- A BBC Radio 4 play, by Nick Warburton, on the removal of the Phillipps collection to Thirlestaine House was broadcast in August 2010,
- (in French) Michelle Moreau-Ricaud: Sir Thomas Phillipps: un bibliophile, in "Freud collectionneur", Ed. Campagnes première, 2011, ISBN 2915789665.

Baronetage of the United Kingdom
New creation	Baronet (of Middle Hill); 1821–1872	Extinct
Preceded by Scott baronets	Phillipps baronets of Middle Hill; 27 July 1821	Succeeded by Harnage baronets
