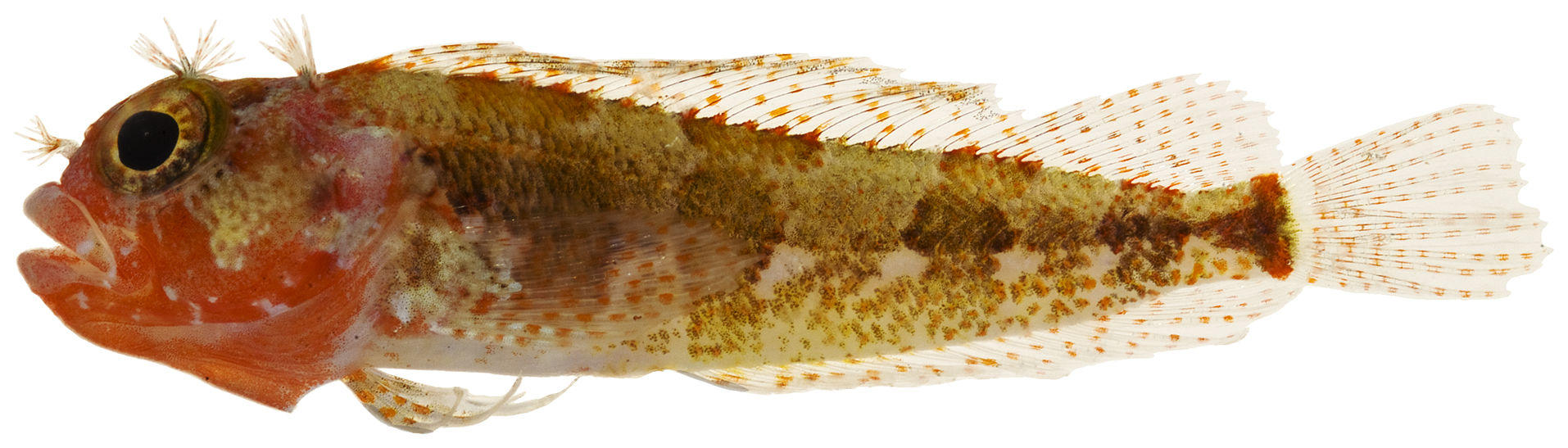

Conservation status
- Least Concern (IUCN 3.1)

Scientific classification
- Kingdom: Animalia
- Phylum: Chordata
- Class: Actinopterygii
- Order: Blenniiformes
- Family: Labrisomidae
- Genus: Gobioclinus
- Species: G. gobio

Binomial name
- Gobioclinus gobio (Valenciennes, 1836)

Synonyms
- Labrisomus gobio (Valenciennes, 1836); Clinus gobio Valenciennes, 1836

= Gobioclinus gobio =

Species of fish

Gobioclinus gobio is a strictly marine ray finned fish, also called Gobioclinus gobio. Its common name is the palehead blenny, and is sometimes referred to as the goggle-eye blenny. It can be identified by its greenish top, red belly, and multicolored banding. L. gobio is a benthic organism with a wide range, taking up residence in a number of coastal environments from Florida to Brazil. This means the fish can live in equatorial, subtropical, and tropical climatic zones. It is native to coastal areas of the Caribbean. Its diet consists mainly of different molluscs and echinoderms.

== Anatomy and morphology ==
Generally, individuals of Gobioclinus gobio are 2.8 to 4.0cm. The maximum length of a male palehead blenny is 6.5cm. Gobioclinus gobio has an anatomy common in Labrosomids, with a small, elongated body. The blenny has cycloid (meaning smooth to the touch) scales on the posterior body. Scales in the series 40-69 are in a lateral line, which aids in movement. Some posterior scales in the series don't have sensory tubes. On the posteroventral surface are the gill membranes, which occur continuously. The stomach cavity has a lining that is white and dotted with dark spots.

Gobioclinus gobio has a broad, grey-brown head and a rounded snout. Its mouth is large and protruding, exposing the back of the upper jawbone. There are more than 2 pores on the tip of its chin. On either side of the head are two or more heavily branched cirri, which are tentacle-like structures lacking features of a traditional tentacle. The cirri are directly anterior to the origin of the dorsal fin. There may also be flaps in front of the nostrils, eyes, and nape of the fish. The palehead blenny lacks an opercular ocellus, which is a colored spot on the head resembling an eye. This feature is common of shorefishes in the greater Caribbean area, so this is one of the markers that Gobioclinus gobio is a non-endemic species.

The blenny's jaw, or maxillary bone, is exposed posteriorly, and has multiple layers of teeth. The outer row consists of large teeth resembling canines or incisors in the upper jaw. Behind this row sit smaller teeth in patches, rather than continuously. Teeth may also grow on the vomer bone or on the palatine, an area on the roof of the mouth. The palatine teeth are significantly larger than the vomer teeth.

Gobioclinus gobio has 3 sets of fins: the dorsal, anal, and pelvic fins, which each consist of a number of rays. Its long dorsal fin consists of 19 dorsal spines. Between the spines and rays of the dorsal fin is a notch. The anal fin consists of 2 spines and 19 segmented rays. Both the dorsal and anal spines are long, often flexible, and longest anteriorly. The pectoral fins commonly have 13 rays. Behind the pectoral fin's base are the pelvic fins, which have one spine and far fewer segmented soft rays (approximately 2 or 3), with a shorter innermost ray that overlaps the middle ray. This singular spine is not externally visible. The shortest pelvic fin ray is over double the length of the longest ray. All of the fin rays of the palehead blenny are unbranched.

The blenny has a unique coloration and marbled pattern, with 4-5 brown and light bands on the body, but not on the fins. The second band is widest at the top. Females may present red spots while males have no coloration. The dorsal and anal fins have very faint markings. A narrow dark line marks the base of the caudal fin. The peritoneum, which is a membrane lining the fish's body, is white with large pigment cells called melanophores.

Much of the internal anatomy of Gobioclinus gobio is unknown.

== Reproduction ==
Gobioclinus gobio's eggs are laid in benthic environments. The larvae are pelagic. Little is known about this specie's reproduction, and more research is required.

== Distribution and habitat ==
Gobioclinus gobio is a marine organism that inhabitants subtropical reefs within depths of 0–15 meters, on rocky shores with heavy vegetation, including algal mats and seagrass beds. It prefers reef habitats with coral and limestone formations, and soft substrates such as sand and gravel.

Gobioclinus gobio populates the Western Atlantic coast of Latin America and around the West Indies, from Mexico to the islands of the Lesser Antilles. The blenny's distribution likely extends to the Western coast of northern South America, as well as the Antilles island chain.

The blenny prefers temperatures of 26.5-28.2 degrees Celsius, with an average of 27.5 degrees Celsius.

== Diet ==
Gobioclinus gobio is a carnivore known to feed on bony fishes and a number of mobile, benthic organisms including worms, crustaceans such as shrimps and crabs, gastropods, and bivalves. It also eats sea stars, sea cucumbers, and sea urchins.

== Behavior ==
Gobioclinus gobio hides in sea anemones as a method of avoiding predators. In order to reside unharmed among the stinging tentacles of the anemone, it has developed both physiological and behavioral adaptations, and is one of nine Caribbean reef fishes recorded to display this characteristic. L. gobio is stung during the acclimation period, which can take several minutes to hours. The behavioral mechanism by which L. gobio acclimates to the anemone is hypothesized to be by a factor of the fish's ability to alter its mucous coating in order to avoid stinging. This negates the need for the fish to acquire mucous from the anemone during acclimation. The mechanism of the physiological adaption is unknown, and more research is required.

There are lateral lines on the front sides of Gobioclinus gobio's body. These allow the blenny to communicate with its school to move together in a school formation.

== Conservation status ==
On the IUCN Red List, Gobioclinus gobio is classified as least concern as of October 18, 2007. It has a low vulnerability, meaning it is not expected to become endangered due to human threats. Gobioclinus gobio is harmless to humans.

== Ecology ==
The blenny's trophic level was determined based on its size and the trophic level of its closest relatives. It is 3.6 ±0.6.
