= HMS Thunderer (1783) =

Ship of the line of the Royal Navy

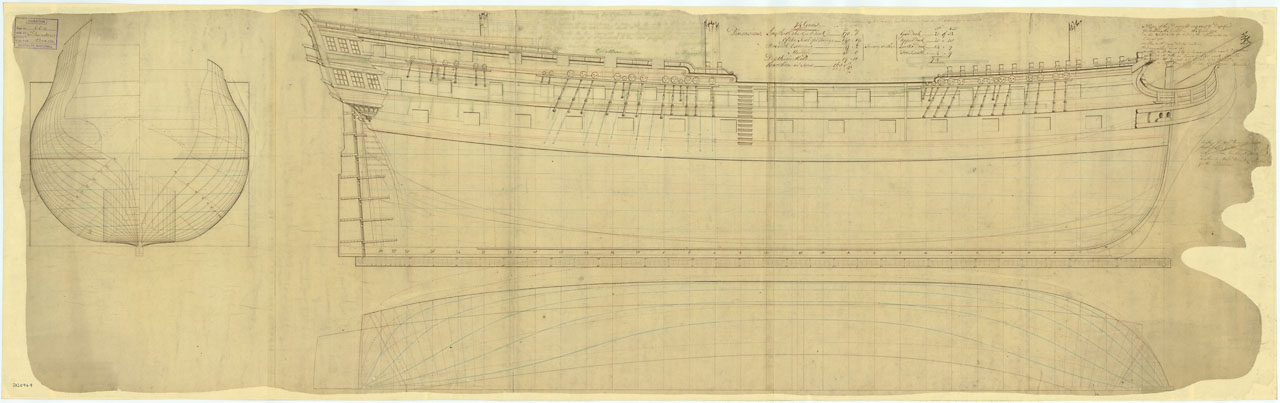
- The plan of Thunderer

History

Great Britain
- Name: HMS Thunderer
- Ordered: 23 July 1781
- Builder: John & William Wells, Rotherhithe
- Laid down: March 1782
- Launched: 13 November 1783
- Commissioned: January 1793
- Fate: Broken up, March 1814
- Notes: Participated in: Glorious First of June; Battle of Cape Finisterre; Battle of Trafalgar; Dardanelles Operation

General characteristics
- Class & type: Culloden-class ship of the line
- Tons burthen: 1,679 (bm)
- Length: 170 ft 8 in (52.02 m) (gundeck)
- Beam: 47 ft 7 in (14.50 m)
- Depth of hold: 19 ft 11 in (6.07 m)
- Propulsion: Sails
- Sail plan: Full-rigged ship
- Complement: about 600
- Armament: Gundeck: 28 × 32-pounder guns; Upper gundeck: 28 × 18-pounder guns; Quarterdeck: 14 × 9-pounder guns; Forecastle: 4 × 9-pounder guns

HMS Thunderer was a ship of the line of the Royal Navy, built in 1783. She carried 74-guns, being classified as a third rate. During her service she took part in several prominent naval battles of the French Revolutionary Wars and the Napoleonic Wars; including the Glorious First of June, the Battle of Cape Finisterre and the Battle of Trafalgar.

== History ==
Thunderer was built by the Wells brother's shipyard in Rotherhithe and launched on 13 November 1783. After completion, she was laid up until 1792, when she underwent a 'Middling Repair' to bring her into service in 1793. On 17 November 1792, she was severely damaged by fire at Chatham Dockyard. Damage amounting to nearly £1,000 was done.

In 1794 she fought at the Glorious First of June under Captain Albemarle Bertie, and from 1796 to 1801 served in the West Indies, under a succession of captains. During this period, under Captain Pierre Flasse, Thunderer fought at the Battle of Jean-Rabel in which she and HMS Valiant forced the crew of the French frigate Harmonie to scuttle their vessel to prevent her capture.

On 15 October, Melampus and Latona, and later Orion and Thalia, and later still Pomone and Concorde, chased two French frigates, Tartu and Néréide, 50-gun frigate Forte, and the brig-aviso (or corvette) Éveillé. The British ships had to give up on the frigates due to the closeness of the shore. However, Pomone and Thunderer, which had joined the chase, were able to take Eveillé, of 18 guns, and 100 men. (Note: Éveillé had been launched at Bayonne in April 1788. The Royal Navy may have taken her into service, but she was never commissioned. She disappears from the records in 1796.) The French force had been out for 60 days and had captured 12 West Indiamen, two of which, Kent and Albion, the British had already recaptured. Pomone and her squadron had recaptured Kent on 9 October. Orion recaptured Albion. Warren's squadron returned to England in December with the remnants of the expedition to Quiberon Bay.

In mid-1799 Thunderer was part of a British squadron that detained the schooner Pegasus. Pegasus had been flying an American flag and was carrying 68 slaves from Jamaica to Havana. Her captors sent Pegasus into the Bahamas where they were sold in late June and early July. The advertisements for the sales gave the origins of the slaves as Martinique, suggesting that Pegasus had been carrying false papers.

On 10 October 1800, Thunderer rescued the crew of HMS Diligence which had struck a reef off the north coast of Cuba. The British set fire to Diligence as they left. It turned out that she had hit an uncharted shoal near Rio Puercos.

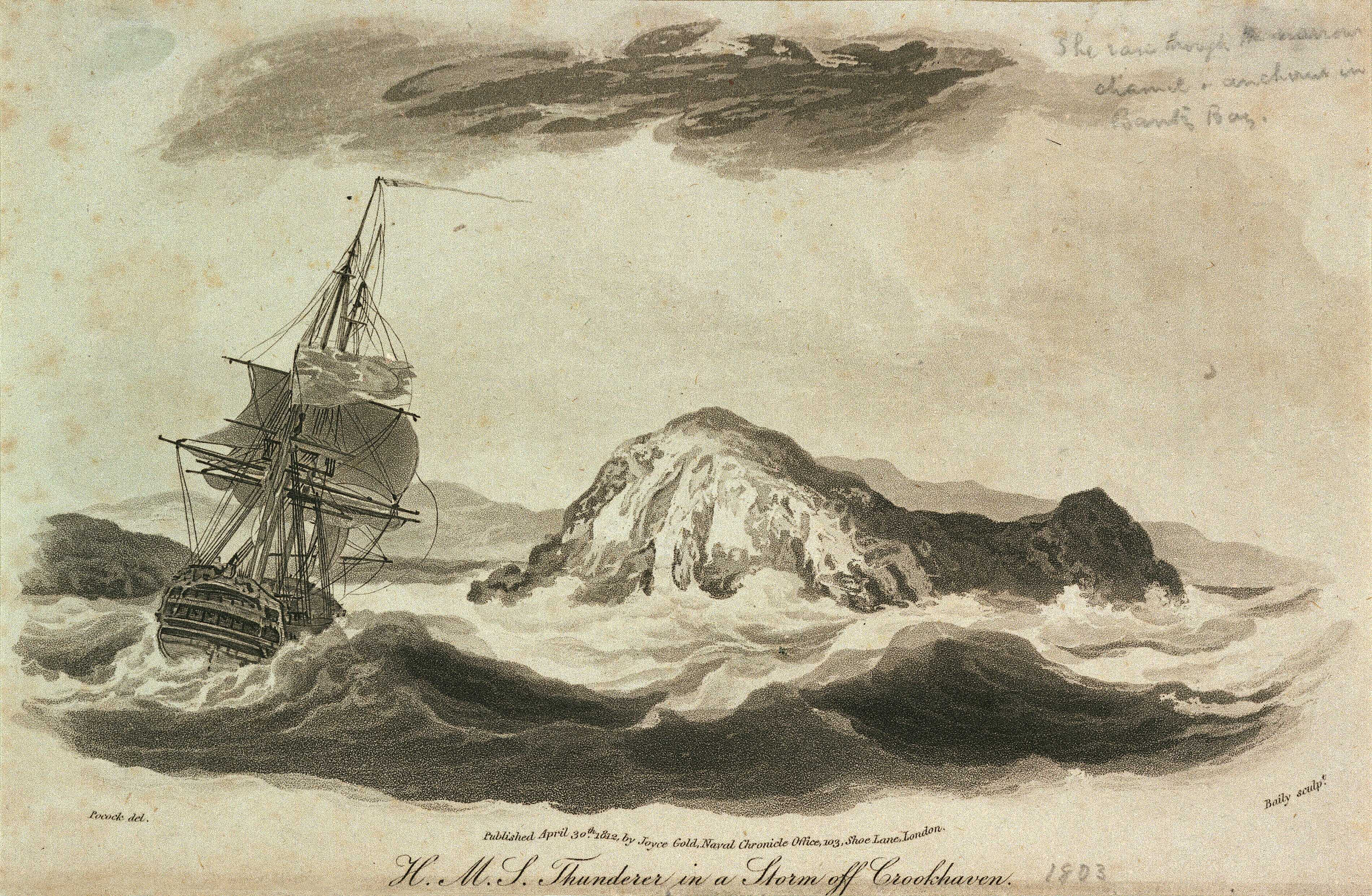
HMS Thunderer in a storm off Crookhaven in 1803

Thunderer was recommissioned in 1803 under the command of Captain William Bedford.

On 14 June 1803 Rosamond arrived at Torbay. She had been sailing to France from San Domingue when Thunderer captured her. Rosamond was carrying a cargo of coffee, cotton, and sugar with an estimated value of £30,000.

On 26 July 1803 Thunderer captured the French privateer brig Venus. Venus, of 358 tons (bm), was pierced for 28 cannons but carried 18, sixteen 6-pounder guns and two 8-pounder carronades. She had a crew of 150 men, under the command of M. Lemperierre. She had sailed from Bordeaux five days earlier, in company with four other privateers. In his letter describing the capture, Captain Bedford described her as quite new, coppered, and well suited for the Royal Navy. (Note: The Navy did not purchase Venus. Instead she was sold at Plymouth on 30 September 1809. The advertisement reported that Venus had been built in Bordeaux in 1803, some months earlier, but had been on her first cruise when captured. she was pierced for 20 cannons on her main deck and eight on her quarterdeck.)

In 1805 Thunderer fought in Admiral Calder's fleet at the Battle of Cape Finisterre. Her captain, William Lechmere, returned to England to attend a court-martial as a witness to the events of Admiral Calder's action off Cape Finisterre at the time of the battle. Later that year she fought at the Battle of Trafalgar under the command of her First Lieutenant, John Stockham. The surgeon on board was Scotsman James Marr Brydone, who was the first of the main British battle fleet to sight the Franco-Spanish fleet. Thunderer signalled the Victory and three minutes later battle orders were signalled to the British fleet beginning the Battle of Trafalgar. On 25 November, Thunderer detained the Ragusan ship Nemesis, of 350 tons (bm), four guns and 18 men, Poulovich, master. Nemesis was sailing from Isle de France to Leghorn, Italy, with a cargo of spice, indigo dye, and other goods. Thunderer shared the prize money with ten other British warships.

In 1807, Thunderer served in the Dardanelles Operation as part of a squadron under Admiral Sir John Duckworth and was badly damaged when the squadron withdrew from the area. However, she accompanied Duckworth on the Alexandria expedition of 1807, and in May left Alexandria for Malta, where she was provisioned and repaired over a period of 30 days.

She was decommissioned in November 1808 and broken up in March 1814.

It is reputed that some of her timbers were re-used to build Christ Church, Totland on the Isle of Wight, whilst others were used in the construction of the lych gate at St. Nicolas' Church at North Stoneham near Eastleigh.
