= Fred W. Stockham =

United States Marine Corps Medal of Honor recipient

Fred William Stockham
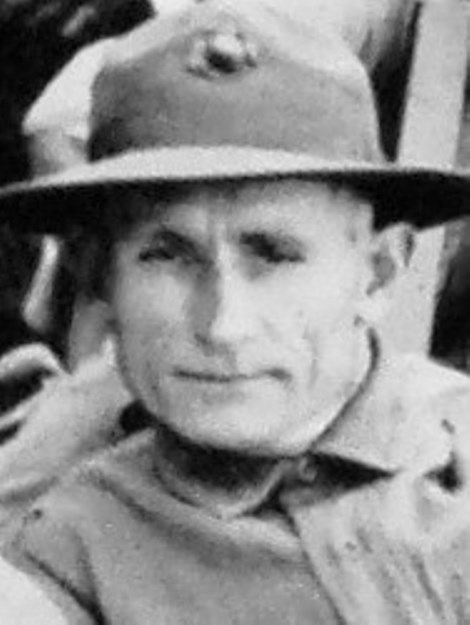
- Medal of Honor recipient
- Born: March 16, 1881; Detroit, Michigan, U.S.
- Died: June 22, 1918 (aged 37); Belleau Wood, France
- Military career
- Allegiance: United States of America
- Branch: United States Marine Corps
- Service years: 1903–1907, 1912–1918
- Rank: Gunnery sergeant
- Unit: 2nd Battalion, 6th Marines
- Conflicts: World War I: Western Front; German spring offensive; Third Battle of the Aisne; Battle of Belleau Wood †
- Awards: Medal of Honor; Silver Star; Purple Heart

Fred William Stockham (March 16, 1881 in Detroit – June 22, 1918 in France) was a United States Marine who posthumously received the Medal of Honor for his self-sacrificial valor during the Battle of Belleau Wood in World War I.

== Early life and education ==
Stockham was born in Detroit, Michigan on March 16, 1881. His mother died and his father traveled to New Jersey where he left the young child to be raised by a foster mother, Sophie Heinz in Newark. He enlisted in the Marine Corps on July 16, 1903, and, over the next four years, served twice in the Philippines, from September 26, 1903, to August 28, 1905, and from September 29, 1906, to January 13, 1907, and did one tour of duty in China in the intervening period. Private Stockham was honorably discharged at New York City on July 15, 1907. He moved to Belleville, New Jersey and served as a fireman in the area. Five years later, on May 31, 1912, he reenlisted in the Marine Corps.

== Career ==
By the time he was again discharged, on May 30, 1916, he had risen to the rank of sergeant and had served most of his term ashore in Nicaragua. Sgt. Stockham saw combat during the engagement at León, Nicaragua, on October 6, 1915, a little over a month before his departure from that troubled Latin American nation. He was honorably discharged again on May 30, 1916, this time at Mare Island, Calif. However, within a week, he had returned to New York City, where on June 7, he reenlisted.

By February 8, 1918, Sgt. Stockham was in France and heading for the trenches. Between that time and his death, he served in the Toulon sector, in the Aisne operation, and at Belleau Wood. During the last-named battle, Gunnery Sergeant Stockham displayed the "conspicuous gallantry and intrepidity above and beyond the call of duty" which later earned him the Medal of Honor in 1939 after the statute of limitations was waived by a joint resolution.

Gy. Sgt. Stockham died in France on June 22, 1918. Thanks to the efforts of his former Lt. Clifton Cates (who would eventually become Marine Corps Commandant) and comrades, one of whom was the man whose life his gas mask saved, Barak Mattingly, Gy. Sgt. Stockham was belatedly and posthumously authorized the Medal of Honor by a joint resolution that waived the statute of limitations, passed on July 15, 1939, over 20 years after his sacrifice.

== Medal of Honor Citation ==
Rank and organization: Gunnery Sergeant, U.S. Marine Corps, 96th Company, 2d Battalion, 6th Regiment (Marines), 2d Division, American Expeditionary Forces. Place and date: At Bois-de-Belleau, France. Action Dates: June 13–14, 1918. Entered service at: New York, N.Y. Birth: Detroit, Michigan. General Orders: War Department, General Orders No. 15 (July 1939)

Citation:

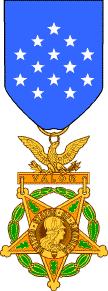
1904–44 Army version

During an intense enemy bombardment with high explosive and gas shells which wounded or killed many members of the company, G/Sgt. Stockham, upon noticing that the gas mask of a wounded comrade was shot away, without hesitation, removed his own gas mask and insisted upon giving it to the wounded man, well knowing that the effects of the gas would be fatal to himself. He continued with undaunted courage and valor to direct and assist in the evacuation of the wounded, until he himself collapsed from the effects of gas, dying as a result thereof a few days later. His courageous conduct undoubtedly saved the lives of many of his wounded comrades and his conspicuous gallantry and spirit of self-sacrifice were a source of great inspiration to all who served with him.

Note – Gunnery Sergeant Stockham's Medal of Honor was awarded by the Secretary of the War and, thus, it would have been of the Army design rather than the naval design.

== Silver Star Citation ==
Rank and organization: Gunnery Sergeant, U.S. Marine Corps, 96th Company, 6th Regiment (Marines), 2nd Division, American Expeditionary Forces. Born: March 16, 1881, New York, New York. Action Dates: June 6 – July 10, 1918. General Orders: Citation Orders, 2d Division, American Expeditionary Forces.

Citation:

By direction of the President, under the provisions of the act of Congress approved July 9, 1918 (Bul. No. 43, W.D., 1918), Gunnery Sergeant Fred William Stockham (MCSN: 74310), United States Marine Corps, is cited (Posthumously) by the Commanding General, SECOND Division, American Expeditionary Forces, for gallantry in action and a silver star may be placed upon the ribbon of the Victory Medals awarded him. Gunnery Sergeant Stockham distinguished himself while serving with the 96th Company, Sixth Regiment (Marines), 2d Division, American Expeditionary Forces at Chateau-Thierry, France, 6 June - 10 July 1918.

== Military Awards ==
Stockham's military decorations and awards include:

1st row	Medal of Honor	Silver Star		
2nd row	Purple Heart		Marine Corps Good Conduct Medal	Philippine Campaign Medal
3rd row	Nicaraguan Campaign Medal		World War I Victory Medal w/two bronze service stars to denote credit for the Aisne and Defensive Sector battle clasps.	Croix de guerre 1914–1918 w/gilt star (French Republic)
Unit Award	French Fourragère – Authorized permanent wear based on two French Croix de Guerre with Palm and one French Croix de Guerre with Gilt Star unit citations awarded to 6th Marines in WWI.			

== Legacy ==
In 1943, the destroyer USS Stockham (DD-683) was named for Gy. Sgt. Fred W. Stockham, USMC. In 2001, the container & roll-on/roll-off ship USNS Soderman (T-AKR-299) was renamed USNS GYSGT Fred W. Stockham (T-AK-3017). As of 2016, she is still in service.

== See also ==
- List of Medal of Honor recipients for World War I
