= USS Stockham (DD-683) =

Fletcher-class destroyer

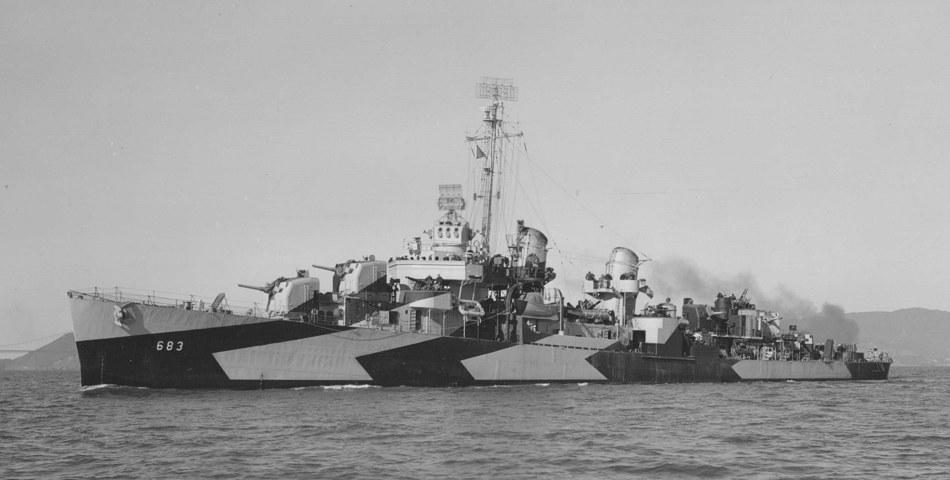
- USS Stockham (DD-683) underway c1944

History

United States
- Namesake: Fred W. Stockham
- Builder: Bethlehem Shipbuilding Corporation, San Francisco, California
- Laid down: 19 December 1942
- Launched: 25 June 1943
- Commissioned: 11 February 1944
- Decommissioned: 30 August 1946
- Recommissioned: 14 November 1951
- Decommissioned: 2 September 1957
- Stricken: 1 December 1974
- Fate: Sunk as target 17 February 1977

General characteristics
- Class & type: Fletcher-class destroyer
- Displacement: 2,050 tons
- Length: 376 ft 5 in (114.7 m)
- Beam: 39 ft 7 in (12.1 m)
- Draft: 17 ft 9 in (5.4 m)
- Propulsion: 60,000 shp (45 MW); 2 propellers
- Speed: 35 knots (65 km/h; 40 mph)
- Range: 6500 nmi. (12,000 km); at 15 kt
- Complement: 329
- Armament: 5 × 5 in (130 mm), 10 × 40 mm AA guns, 10 × 21 inch (533 mm) torpedo tubes

USS Stockham (DD-683), a Fletcher-class destroyer, was a ship of the United States Navy named for Medal of Honor recipient Gy.Sgt. Fred W. Stockham, USMC (1881–1918).

Stockham (DD-683) was laid down on 19 December 1942 by the Bethlehem Steel Co. at San Francisco, California; launched on 25 June 1943; sponsored by Mrs. Melba Mattingly; and commissioned on 11 February 1944, Commander E. P. Holmes in command.

== 1944 ==
The newly commissioned Stockham conducted shakedown training off the west coast until 20 April, and then got underway for Pearl Harbor, Hawaii. There, she continued training until departing for the Marshalls on 31 May in preparation for the invasion of the Mariana Islands. She arrived off Saipan on 14 June and conducted preinvasion bombardments on that island until the 17th. On the 18th, she steamed to the west of the Marianas with Task Group 58.7 (TG 58.7) to engage the approaching enemy fleet. In the ensuing battle, known as the Battle of the Philippine Sea and less formally as "The Great Marianas Turkey Shoot", the 5th Fleet swept the skies clear of Japanese naval air power, though the two fleets never closed to engage in surface action. Instead, the two adversaries launched their planes at one another and American antiaircraft fire and combat air patrol proved superior to the attacking Japanese planes. During the battle, Stockham contributed to the victory by splashing at least three Japanese planes and probably two others.

She rejoined the amphibious forces on 25 June and, until mid-August, supported the occupation of Saipan and Tinian and conducted patrols off Guam. Her primary responsibilities were to protect the invasion fleet from air attack and to render fire support when called. She helped repel several air attacks, splashing another enemy plane in the process, and duelled with Japanese artillery batteries ashore. On 21 August, she entered the lagoon at Eniwetok Atoll for a week before rejoining the Fast Carrier Task Force for a 33-day sweep of the Philippines, during which the carrier planes hit targets on Luzon and Mindanao in addition to striking the Visayan and Palau island sub-groups.

She entered Ulithi on 1 October for provisions and upkeep. During her six-day stay, a typhoon struck the atoll and broke Stockham and two others loose from the nest. She cast off lines and anchored, but was later forced to get underway to evade the storm. She returned with the task group on 4 October to complete upkeep and provisioning in preparation for another cruise with the aircraft carriers.

On 6 October, the destroyer sortied from Ulithi with TG 38.2 for a month-long sweep primarily of the Philippines, but beginning with strikes on Okinawa, on the 10th, and on Formosa, from the 12th to the 14th. She supported the landing at Leyte Gulf on 20 October and screened the carriers during their strikes on southern Luzon and the Visayans on the 21st and 22d. On 25 and 26 October, she joined most of the elements of the 3rd Fleet in meeting and defeating the Japanese Northern Force during the Cape Engaño phase of the Battle for Leyte Gulf. On the 29th, Task Force 38 (TF 38) resumed air strikes on the Philippines. Those raids continued until Christmas broken only by two provisioning and upkeep periods at Ulithi, from 9 to 13 November and from 25 November until 9 December. Stockham's crew spent Christmas Day and the eight days following it at Ulithi preparing for another cruise with the fast carriers.

== 1945 ==
On 3 January 1945, she departed with TG 30.8, the replenishment group for TF 38, and screened it until 7 January, when she rejoined the carriers. Over the next 19 days, she screened the carriers as their planes made sweeps of the inner defenses of the Japanese Empire. They hit French Indochina and Japanese shipping on the 12th, bombed Formosa a second and third time on the 15th and 21st, and struck Hainan, Hong Kong, and the China coast on the 16th. On the way back to Ulithi, they raided Okinawa again, on 22 January.

Following two weeks of upkeep, provisioning, and training at Ulithi, Stockham put to sea with TF 38 to bomb Tokyo on 16 and 17 February and to support the Iwo Jima assault on 19 February. During the short stay in the Volcano Islands, the destroyer's guns brought down another enemy plane. On 22 February, she headed north to Japan and screened the carriers during another air strike on the Japanese home islands. On the 26th, she sank an enemy patrol craft off Tori Shima, fighting heavy seas as well as the Japanese. On 6 March, she put into Ulithi once again for provisions and upkeep.

On 14 March, she put to sea once more and operated with TF 59 until the following day, when she joined the screen of the Fast Carrier Task Force for sweeps of Kyūshū, Okinawa, and Kerama Retto. After the 1 April landings at Okinawa, Stockham remained off that coast until 29 April, protecting the invasion fleet from the onslaught of the kamikazes. On 6 April, she splashed two "Zekes". She bombarded Minami and Kita Daito islands on the 21st. She put into Ulithi on the 30th. On 7 May, she put to sea with TF 58 and, conducting drills along the way, headed for another series of air raids on Kyūshū and Okinawa. She screened the fleet from air attack during the strikes, helping to repel several enemy raids. She parted company with the main body of the fleet on 6 June to escort a group of crippled ships, including the bowless Pittsburgh (CA-72), to Apra Harbor, Guam. She remained at Guam from 11 to 30 June; then escorted a group of ships to Eniwetok, before rejoining TF 38 on 8 July.

Between 8 July and 15 August, she screened the fleet carriers while their planes struck their last series of blows at Japan. Starting with Tokyo on the 10th, they moved swiftly up along Honshū to Hokkaidō, pounding targets on both islands on the 14th and 15th, then returned to Tokyo on the 18th. On 24 July, she bombarded Cape Shiono at the southern extremity of Honshū, and then returned to screening the fleet from suicide attack while it sent planes to pummel Honshū and Shikoku.

On 15 August 1945, the Japanese Empire capitulated and, four days later, Stockham joined the Yokosuka occupation force, which entered Sagami Wan on 27 August. She supported the landings at Tokyo Bay and at Tateyama on the 30th and 31st respectively, then anchored off Yokosuka on 2 September for six days of upkeep, provisioning, and recreation. She was underway from 9 to 18 September, supporting the minesweeping operations in Sendai Bay and in the vicinity of Goshi. She returned to Tokyo Bay for a month on 19 September, conducted training exercises between 24 and 28 October, and then provisioned for the voyage home. On 31 October, Stockham stood out of Yokosuka to return to the United States. After more than a year on the west coast, she was decommissioned on 30 August 1946 and berthed at San Diego, California

== 1950 – 1977 ==
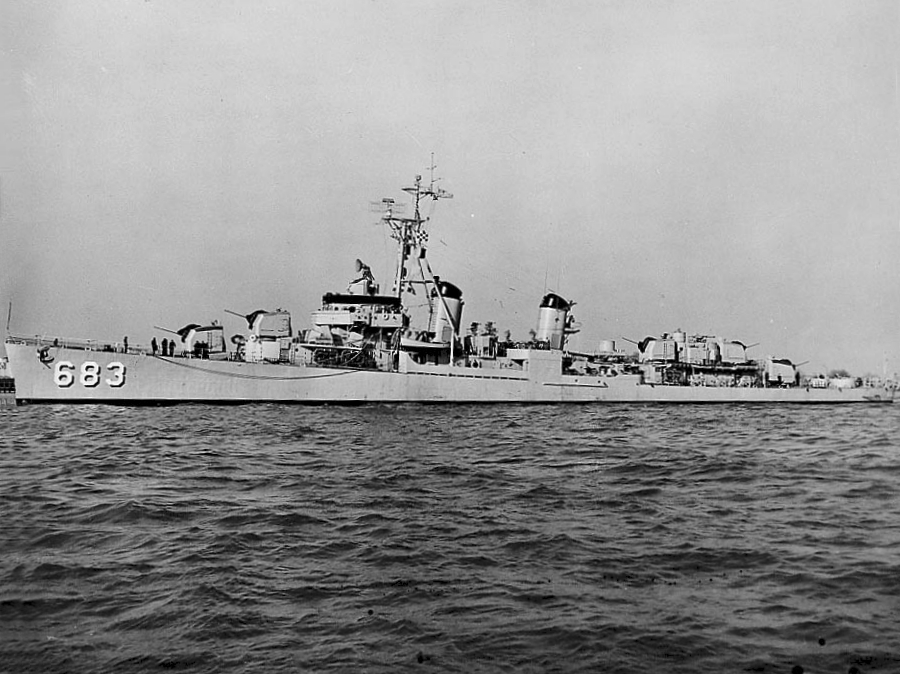
Stockham in the 1950s.

The hostilities in Korea in 1950 necessitated an increase in the size of the active fleet. Stockham was recommissioned on 14 November 1951, Comdr. A. P. Zavadil in command. She was assigned to the Atlantic Fleet until 1953, engaged in fleet training missions out of Newport, R.I. In December 1953, the destroyer joined the United Nations Fleet and operated in the Far East, stopping at the southern tip of Japan, then traveling to the Pusan harbor briefly and later Inchon, until the summer of 1954. In July, she returned to Newport after completing a circumnavigation of the world. In November 1954, Stockham entered Boston Naval Shipyard and, at the completion of her overhaul in February 1955, she shook down in the Caribbean. She then resumed normal operations with the Atlantic Fleet until 1 February 1956, when she was posted to the 6th Fleet. She cruised the Mediterranean for four months; visited Egypt, Israel, Lebanon, and Greece; then, resumed operations out of Newport. Stockham returned to the 6th Fleet in the fall of 1956; visited France, Italy, and Greece; and participated in an antisubmarine exercise with American and Italian ships. On 23 February 1957, the destroyer returned to Newport. Seven months later, she was decommissioned on 2 September 1957 and placed in the Atlantic Reserve Fleet at Philadelphia, Pennsylvania.

Stockham was stricken from the Naval Vessel Register 1 December 1974, and sunk as a target off Puerto Rico 17 February 1977. Stockham's anchor is located at South Christian High School in Byron Center, Michigan.

Stockham (DD-683) earned eight battle stars during World War II.
