= Nicholas Guppy =

Trinidad and Tobago botanist (1925–2012)

- Born: December 22, 1925; Port of Spain, Trinidad and Tobago
- Died: May 16, 2012 (aged 86); Bali, Indonesia
- Occupations: botanist, writer, environmentalist, explorer
- Spouse: Shusha Guppy (1962–1976)
- Children: 2, including Darius Guppy
- Relatives: Lechmere Guppy (grandfather)

Nicholas Gareth Lechmere Guppy (22 December 1925 – 16 May 2012) was a Trinidad and Tobago-born British botanist, writer, environmentalist, explorer, and art dealer.

== Early life and education ==
Guppy was born in Port-of-Spain 22 December 1925 to Gareth and Marjorie (née Hooper) Guppy. His father Gareth was the son of Lechmere Guppy (after whom the guppy is named) and Alice (née Rostant), the daughter of a local white family.

Between 1933 and 1936 the family lived in Saint Ann's in Port of Spain, near the Royal Botanic Gardens. Guppy and his mother emigrated to England in 1938 after the death of his father from malaria.

He was educated at Kelly College, in Tavistock and Trinity College, Cambridge, where he earned a degree in botany. He then studied at the Imperial Forestry Institute, and at Magdalen College in Oxford.

== Career ==
Guppy joined the Colonial Service in British Guiana, and led six expeditions into the interior of the country. He travelled up the Essequibo River near the border with Brazil for the first time in 1949, an area which had been "penetrated only two or three times" by non-Indigenous explorers before Guppy's visit. He later worked as a guest scientist at the New York Botanical Gardens.

He first encountered the Wai-Wai people on an expedition in 1952, and later spent "several years" living among them. He wrote about his life with them in his book, Wai-Wai: Through the Forests North of the Amazon.

In February 1969, British writer Norman Lewis published an article called "Genocide" in The Sunday Times Magazine which documented atrocities committed against Indigenous people by the government of Brazil. In response to this article, Guppy and his friend Francis Huxley wrote a letter to The Sunday Times entitled "A wild life fund for humans is needed". Guppy, Huxley, John Hemming, and Robin Hanbury-Tenison founded the Primitive Peoples’ Fund that year, which was later renamed Survival International.

Guppy became a "name" (underwriter) at Lloyd's of London, and lost "almost everything he owned" in a financial crisis at Lloyd's in the late 1980s. In revenge, his son Darius later staged a fake robbery in revenge and collected £1.8 million in a fraudulent insurance payout from Lloyds.

== Personal life ==
Guppy married Shusha Assar, an Iranian-born writer and musician, in 1962. The couple had two sons, Darius and Constantine, and divorced in 1976. Guppy married twice more, and was survived by his third wife, Anna.

Guppy moved to Bali in 2004 and died there on 16 May 2012.
