= Sayyed Muhammad Kazim ʻAssar =

Shiʿite scholar

Sayyed Muhammad Kazim ʽAssar (Persian: سید محمدکاظم عصار; born 1302 AH/1884-85 AD; died Tehran, 19 Dey 1353 Š. AH/9 January 1975 AD) was a prominent Shia scholar and professor of philosophy at the University of Tehran.

Mohammad Kazem ʽAssar was born in Kazmin in 1300 AH. His father, Mohammad Hosseini Lavasani Tehrani (1264-1356 AH), was a jurist and the author of religious and philosophical works, including a commentary on "Sharh al-Nazumeh" by Mulla Hadi Sabzevari. ʽAssar moved to Tehran with his father at the age of four. His grandfather was Seyyed Mahmoud Hosseini of Mazandarani origin, who was born in Lavasan and lived in Tehran and worked as an oil refinery. ʽAssar's father gave up his job as an Asari and studied seminary courses and was engaged in teaching and writing Islamic sciences until the end of his life.

ʽAssar began his formal education at the age of three when, along with learning the basics, he started memorizing the Qurʾān. He then joined ʽAbd-Allāh Khan traditional school (madrasa) at the age of five, where he studied Arabic language and literature for three years and spent six years at Khan Marvi and Ṣadr schools studying Islamic jurisprudence and theology. He also studied mysticism and philosophy with Mirzā Hasan of Kermānšāh and Mirzā Hāšem of Gilān and attended the teaching discourses of Mīrzā Ṣadrā, while mastering old mathematics with Mīrzā ʽAlī Akbar of Yazd, an expert on Islamic sciences. On the latter’s advice, he later joined the modern school of Dār al-Fonūn where he studied new mathematics and French. He left Persia, returning to Tehran in 1921 and began a new teaching career in both traditional and modern schools, and later at the University of Tehran, which had been recently established.

ʽAssar was 90 years old at the time of his death. He was buried at the tomb of Abu'l-Fotuh Razi at the Shah Abd-al-Azim shrine in south Tehran.
