= John Stockham =

Captain John Stockham
- Born: 24 July 1765
- Died: 6 February 1814 (aged 48); Exeter, Devon, England
- Burial place: St Sidwell's Church, Exeter, Devon, England
- Military career
- Allegiance: United Kingdom of Great Britain and Ireland
- Branch: Royal Navy
- Rank: Captain
- Commands: HMS Thunderer
- Conflicts: French Revolutionary Wars; Battle of Copenhagen; Napoleonic Wars; Battle of Cape Finisterre; Battle of Trafalgar

Captain John Stockham (24 July 1765 – 6 February 1814) was an officer in the Royal Navy during the Napoleonic Wars, whose career is now obscured to the point that very little of his life is known up until 1805, when he was suddenly and unexpectedly called upon to command the ship of the line HMS Thunderer at the Battle of Trafalgar.

== Early career ==
Stockham was born in July 1765 to a middle class Devon family, and was baptised in Exeter on 24 July. The date he joined the navy is not known and neither is the ship he joined, but it is likely that he was at sea before the end of the American War of Independence and may have seen action there, although this can not be proven. He was promoted to lieutenant on 29 April 1797 when he was 32, a full fourteen years after the normal age for this promotion. This was likely the result of a failure to gain interest or sponsorship from an admiral, politician or other person of influence. Early in 1801, while serving as lieutenant aboard HMS San Josef, Stockham came to the attention of Horatio Nelson, who took Stockham with him when he transferred to HMS Elephant, prior to the Battle of Copenhagen.

== Napoleonic Wars ==
The next time Stockham appears in the historical record is after the Peace of Amiens, where he was first lieutenant of HMS Thunderer. Thunderer had participated in the Battle of Cape Finisterre in July 1805 under her captain, William Lechmere, and Lechmere had then become embroiled in the controversy surrounding Sir Robert Calder's conduct in the action. When Calder insisted on a court martial, he requested Lechmere, along with William Brown of HMS Ajax and Philip Durham of HMS Defiance to come back to London and testify in his defence. Durham refused but Brown and Lechmere did not, leaving their first lieutenants in charge of their ships.

=== Battle of Trafalgar ===
At the battle, on 21 October 1805, Thunderer's position was towards the rear of Collingwood's division, and so she did not reach the action until well on into the day. Nonetheless, Stockham and Thunderer performed admirably, engaging the Spanish flagship Principe de Asturias and the French Neptune. Thunderer suffered 16 casualties but remained largely intact, which enabled her to aid more battered ships during the storm which followed.

== Later life ==
Following the action, Stockham was granted a gold medal and sword from the Lloyd's Patriotic Fund, and was promoted to Post Captain on Christmas Day of that year. Stockham, like many other officers who served in the battle, was unable to find a ship for future service. He retired to Exeter a few years later, where he lived peacefully until his death in 1814. He was buried in a family plot in St Sidwell's Church, but German bombing during the Blitz destroyed his grave. Exactly the same raid that destroyed Stockham's tombstone also destroyed the grave, in a different Exeter churchyard, of Robert Benjamin Young, the captain of HMS Entreprenante, one of the small ships that accompanied the fleet at Trafalgar,.
