= Lechmere Guppy =

British-born Trinidad and Tobago naturalist

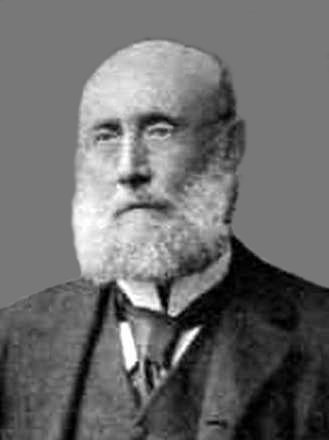
- Born: Robert John Lechmere Guppy; 15 August 1836; London, England
- Died: 5 August 1916 (aged 79); San Fernando, Trinidad and Tobago
- Spouse: Alice Rostant
- Children: 9, including Yseult Bridges
- Mother: Amelia Elizabeth Guppy
- Relatives: Sarah Guppy (grandmother) Nicholas Guppy (grandson)

Robert John Lechmere Guppy (15 August 1836 in London – 5 August 1916 in San Fernando, Trinidad and Tobago) was a British-born Trinidad and Tobago naturalist after whom the guppy is named. He contributed much to the geology, palaeontology and zoology of the West Indian region, in particular Trinidad.

== Early life ==
Lechmere Guppy was born in Chancery Lane, London, the second child of Robert, a lawyer and Amelia Guppy (née Parkinson) a painter. When Lechmere was a child his parents purchased a pair of sugar estates in Trinidad and moved there, leaving Lechmere with his maternal grandfather in Kinnersley Castle, Herefordshire, and his siblings Lucy and Francis with their paternal grandparents in Clifton, Bristol.

After the death of his grandfather, Guppy continued to live at Kinnersley Castle with his uncle, John Parkinson, who had inherited the property. Parkinson wanted to make Guppy his chief heir and have him take over the management of the extensive estate. His daughter Yseult later wrote, Guppy was "appalled where almost anyone else might have been delighted", because he wanted to be a scientist.

== Departure from England ==
When Guppy was eighteen he received a gift from the second Baron de Saumarez, the widowed husband of his great-aunt, which allowed him to apply to the University of Oxford.

While there, Guppy received a "series of letters" from his uncle, trying to convince him to return to Kinnersley. Instead, Guppy took a ship to Australia, and then travelled to Tasmania. After spending a few weeks in Tasmania he sailed for New Zealand.

Guppy shipwrecked on the coast of New Zealand. He lived with the Māori for over two years, during which time his uncle sold Kinnersley. After deciding that it was "safe to return" Guppy travelled to the nearest English settlement in New Zealand. From there, he sailed to England, and then Trinidad, where his parents lived.

== Trinidad ==
In Trinidad, Guppy settled with his parents in San Fernando initially, and later moved to Port of Spain to accept a job with the government. While living in Port of Spain he collected a small fish commonly known as "millions" living in the St. Ann's River. He shared specimens with Albert Günther at the British Museum, who named them Girardinus guppii in Guppy's honour. Now considered a junior synonym of Poecilia reticulata, the common name "guppy" still remains.

Guppy married Alice Rostant, the daughter of local French planters and a descendant of the Counts de Rostang, French aristocrats who had fled to Trinidad to escape the French Revolution. he became Trinidad's Chief Inspector of Schools until his retirement in 1891.

Guppy lived at 26 Queens Park West, in Port of Spain, a single-story dwelling raised off the ground on stone pillars, and was located in the most desirable neighbourhood in the town. It faced the Queen's Park Savannah and looked north toward the Governor's House. After the death of his father in November 1894, the family moved to another house nearby after the arrival of a new family in the house next door proved too noisy for him. A few years later Guppy purchased a cocoa estate called Glenside in eastern Trinidad, near Tunapuna, and the family relocated to the plantation.

Although he had no formal training in the sciences Lechmere wrote and published numerous articles on the malacology and palaeontology of the region. He served as President of the Scientific Association of Trinidad, as well as of the Royal Victoria Institute Board. He contributed about seventy memoirs or papers between 1863 and 1913. His special interest went to palaeoconchology and recent mollusks, especially the terrestrial and fluviatile species, of which he described many new species.

== Bibliography ==
(incomplete)

- Guppy, R. J. L. (1866). "On the Tertiary Mollusca of Jamaica". Quarterly Journal of the Geological Society. 22 (1–2): 281–295. doi:10.1144/GSL.JGS.1866.022.01-02.19. S2CID 130810484.
- Guppy, R. J. Lechmere; Hogg, Jabez (1868). "IV. On the Lingual Dentition of some West-Indian Gasteropoda". Transactions of the Linnean Society of London. 26: 191–196. doi:10.1111/j.1096-3642.1968.tb00505.x.
- Guppy, R. J. L. (1868). "On the terrestrial mollusks of Dominica and Grenada, with an account of some new species from Trinidad". Annals and Magazine of Natural History. 1 (4): 429–442. doi:10.1080/00222936808695726.
- 1872. Third series of additions to the Catalogue of the land and freshwater Molluska of Trinidad: with a revised list of all the species.
- 1873. "On some new Tertiary fossils from Jamaica". Proceedings of the Science Association of Trinidad 2(2): 72–88, London.
- Guppy, R. J. Lechmere (1874). "IV.—On the West Indian Tertiary Fossils". Geological Magazine. 1 (9): 404–411. Bibcode:1874GeoM....1..404G. doi:10.1017/S0016756800168475. S2CID 130602073.
- Guppy, R. J. Lechmere (1874). "I.—On the West Indian Tertiary Fossils". Geological Magazine. 1 (10): 433–446. Bibcode:1874GeoM....1..433G. doi:10.1017/S0016756800169638. S2CID 248532331.
- Guppy, R. J. Lechmere (1875). "VI.—Supplement to the Paper on West Indian Tertiary Fossils". Geological Magazine. 2 (1): 41–42. Bibcode:1875GeoM....2...41G. doi:10.1017/S0016756800111744. S2CID 128408620.
- Guppy, R. J. L. (1876). "On the Miocene Fossils of Haiti". Quarterly Journal of the Geological Society. 32 (1–4): 516–532. doi:10.1144/GSL.JGS.1876.032.01-04.58. S2CID 130862452.
- Guppy, R. J. Lechmere; Dall, W. H. (1896). "Descriptions of tertiary fossils from the Antillean region". Proceedings of the United States National Museum. 19 (1110). Washington, D.C.: 303–331. doi:10.5479/si.00963801.19-1110.303. hdl:2027/mdp.39015066911564.
- Lechmere Guppy, R. J. (1911). "On the Geology of Antigua and other West Indian Islands with reference to the Physical History of the Caribean [sic] Region". Quarterly Journal of the Geological Society. 67 (1–4): 681–NP. doi:10.1144/GSL.JGS.1911.067.01-04.26. S2CID 219223032.
- 1912. "Fossils from Springvale near Couva, Trinidad". Agricultural Society of Trinidad and Tobago, 2: London.
