= List of endemic species of Clipperton Island =

Clipperton Island, also known as Île de la Passion, is an uninhabited French atoll in the eastern Pacific Ocean.

== Algae ==
Scientific name	Common name	Photo	Ref
Cosmarium clippertonensi			

== Fish ==
Scientific name	Common name	Photo	Ref
Holacanthus limbaughi	Clipperton angelfish		
Ophioblennius clippertonensis	Clipperton fangedblenny		
Stegastes baldwini	Baldwin's major		
Myripristis gildi	Clipperton cardinal soldierfish		
Pseudogramma axelrodi	Axelrod's reefbass		
Thalassoma robertsoni	Clipperton rainbow wrasse		
Xyrichtys wellingtoni	Clipperton razorfish		

== Invertebrates ==
Scientific name	Common name	Photo	Ref
Succinea atollica			
Cryptops navigans			
Calcinus mclaughlinae			
Callyspongia roosevelti			
Cypridopsis oceanus			
Suberea etiennei			
Turbonilla clippertonensis			
Chrysallida limbaughi			
Chama rubropicta			
Epicodakia clippertonensi			
Megabalanus clippertonensis			
Anaitides albengai			
Potamocypris insularis			

== Vertebrates ==
Scientific name	Common name	Photo	Ref
Emoia arundelii			
