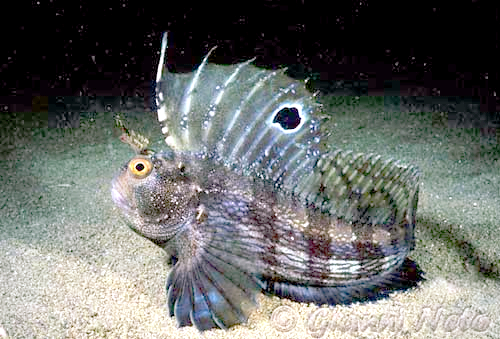

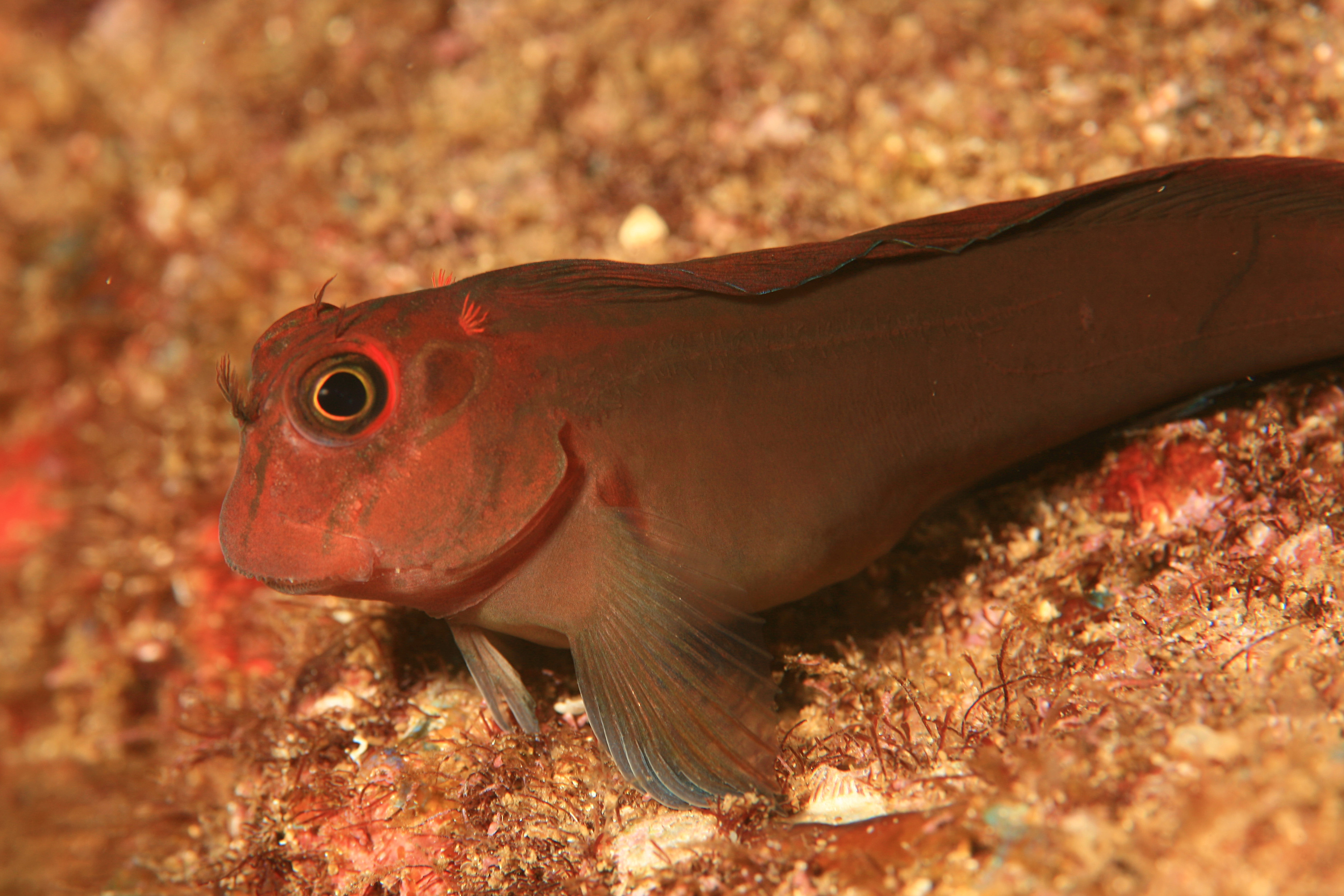
- Ophioblennius steindachneri

Scientific classification
- Kingdom: Animalia
- Phylum: Chordata
- Class: Actinopterygii
- Order: Blenniiformes
- Suborder: Blennioidei; Bleeker, 1860

Type species
- Blennius ocellaris Linnaeus, 1758

Families
- See text

= Blennioidei =

Blennies Temporal range: Early Eocene–recent

Order of fishes

Blennies (from the Greek ἡ βλέννα and τό βλέννος, mucus, slime) are a diverse clade of ray-finned fish in the suborder Blennioidei of the percomorph order Blenniiformes. They inhabit marine, brackish, and occasionally freshwater habitats, and generally share similar morphology and behaviour. About 151 genera and nearly 900 species have been described within the order.

== Taxonomy ==
The order was formerly classified as a suborder of the Perciformes. However, the 5th Edition of Fishes of the World divided the Perciformes into a number of new orders and the Blenniiformes were placed in the percomorph clade Ovalentaria alongside the such taxa as Cichliformes, Mugiliformes and Gobiesociformes. Eschmeyer's Catalog of Fishes added many more taxa, including the damselfishes and clingfishes, into the Blenniiformes, so the "true blennies" were redefined as the suborder Blennioidei.

The six "true blenny" families are:

- Blenniidae Rafinesque, 1810 - combtooth blennies, including the sabre-toothed blennies
- Chaenopsidae Gill, 1865 - pikeblennies, tubeblennies and flagblennies
- Clinidae Swainson, 1839 - clinids, including the giant kelpfish
- Dactyloscopidae Gill, 1859 - sand stargazers
- Labrisomidae Clark Hubbs, 1952
- Tripterygiidae Whitley, 1931 - threefin blennies

The earliest known blennoid fossil is the otolith-based species Exallias vectensis from the Early Eocene of France. However, skeletal remains of blennies only appear in the fossil record during the Miocene.

== Similarities with other families ==
The blennioids are superficially quite similar to members of the goby and dragonet families, as well as several other unrelated families whose members have occasionally been given the name "blenny". Many blennies demonstrate mimicry of other species, such as Aspidontus taeniatus. This mimicry allows the blenny to get up close to fish that would normally let Labroides dimidiatus (the bluestreak cleaner wrasse), clean them. The blenny then takes nips or larger bites out of the unsuspecting fish. There are two genera of blennies that demonstrate Batesian mimicry - Ecsenius and Plagiotremus.

== Morphology ==
Blennioids are generally small fish, only occasionally reaching lengths up to 55 cm, with elongated bodies (some almost eel-like), and relatively large eyes and mouths. Their dorsal fins are often continuous and long; the pelvic fins typically have a single embedded spine and are short and slender, situated before the pectoral fins. The tail fin is rounded. The blunt heads of blennioids often possess elaborate whisker-like structures called cirri.

== Behavior and feeding ==
As generally benthic fish, blennioids spend much of their time on or near the sea floor; many are reclusive and may burrow in sandy substrates or inhabit crevices in reefs, the lower stretches of rivers, or even empty mollusc shells. Some blennies, otherwise known as "rock-hoppers", leap from the water onto rocks in order to reach other pools.

As far as predation, blennies depend on a secretive lifestyle, hiding on the sea floors in shallow water, with cryptic coloration.

== Venom ==
For protection, there is only one genus that is truly venomous, namely Meiacanthus. These fish can inject venom from their mandibular, hollow fangs. They have venom that contains the opioid-like enkephalin, phospholipase, and neuropeptide Y.

== Distribution ==
True blennies are widely distributed in coastal waters, often abundant and easily observed which has made them the subject for many studies of ecology and behaviour. Two of the families, the Blennidae and the Tripterygiidae have global distributions, the Clinidae have a mainly temperate distribution and the remaining three families are largely Neotropical. This distribution makes these fish ideal subjects for studies of biogeography. It is thought that the splitting of the Tethys Sea by the formation of the Isthmus of Panama combined with Pliocene warming of the climate may have been important factors influencing the evolution and biogeography of the Blenniiformes.

== Gallery ==
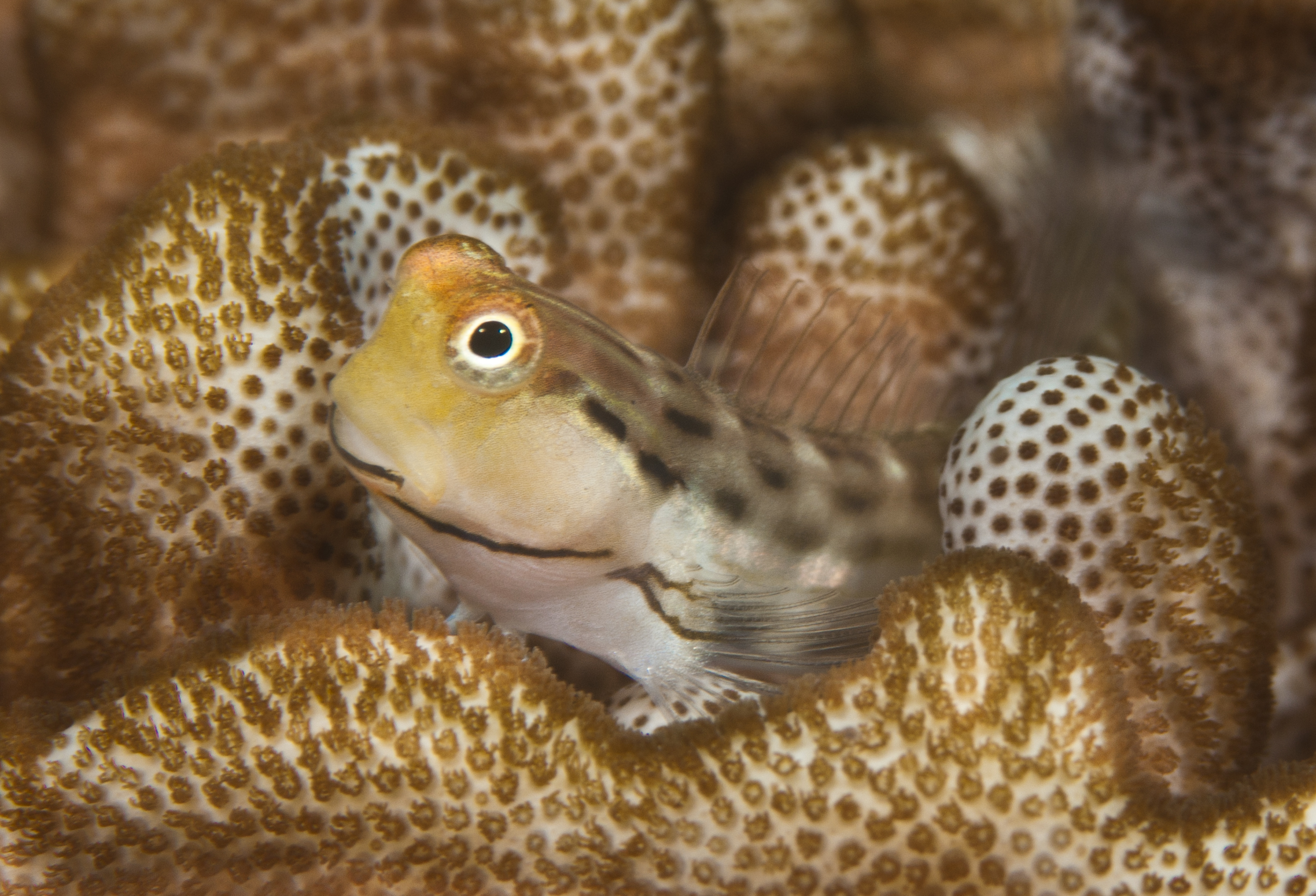
Salarias sinuosus, the fringelip blenny

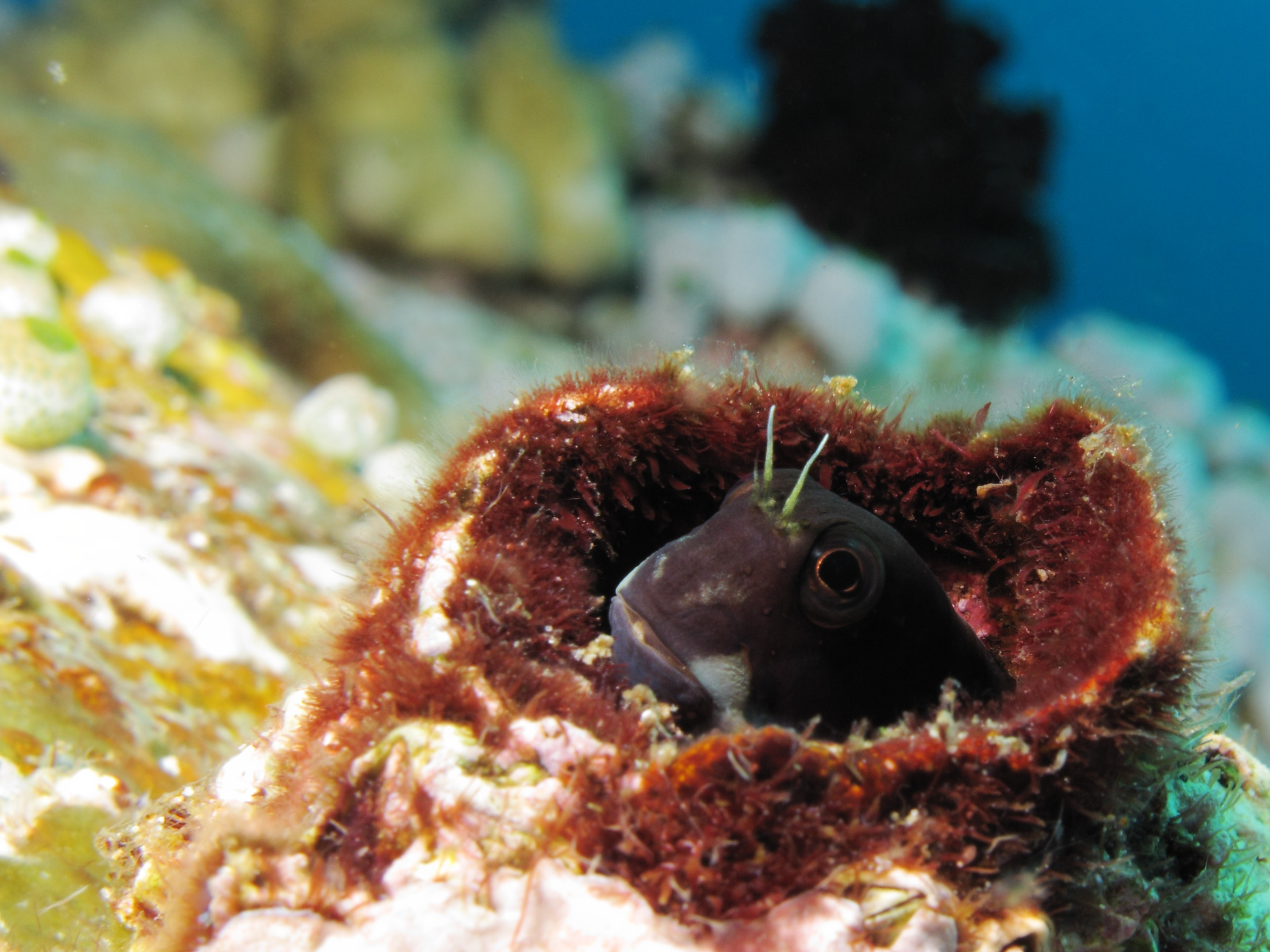
Blenny hiding in a hole near Gilli Lawa Laut, Indonesia

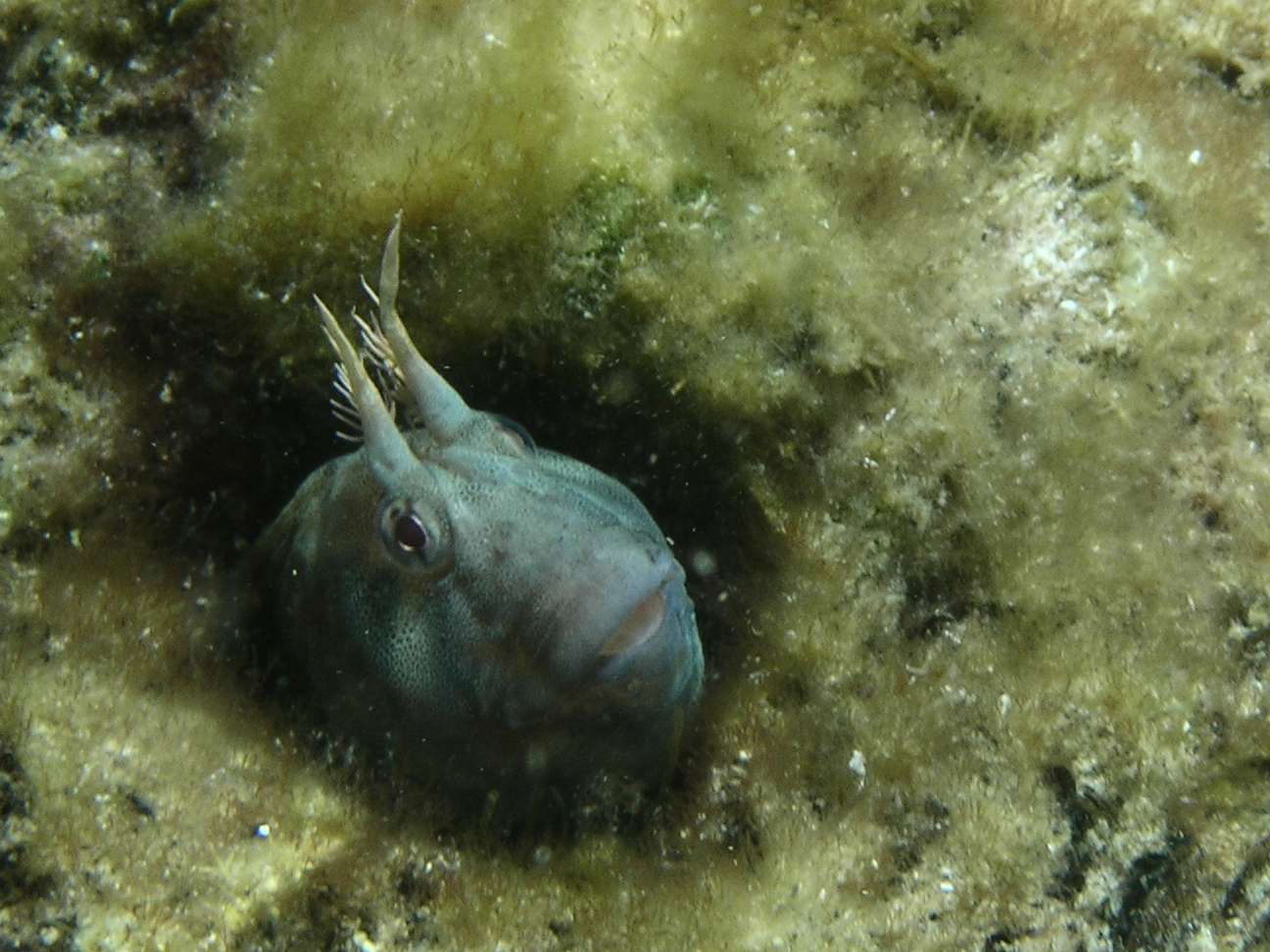
Tasmanian blenny in Port Noarlunga, South Australia

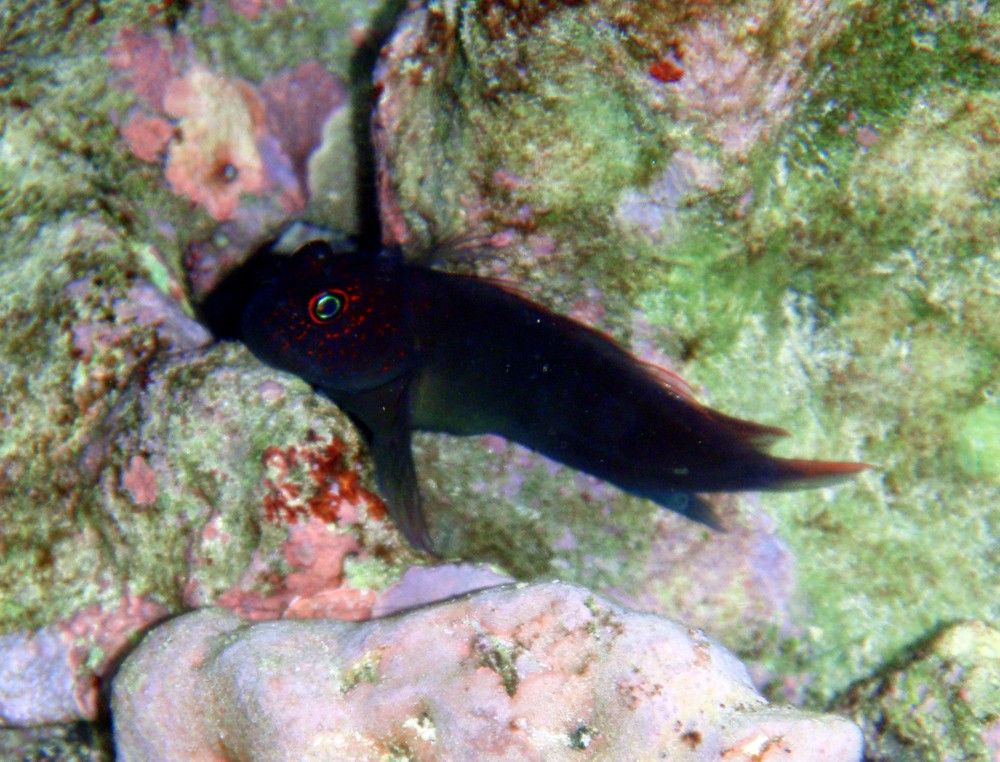
Blenny in Kona, Hawaii

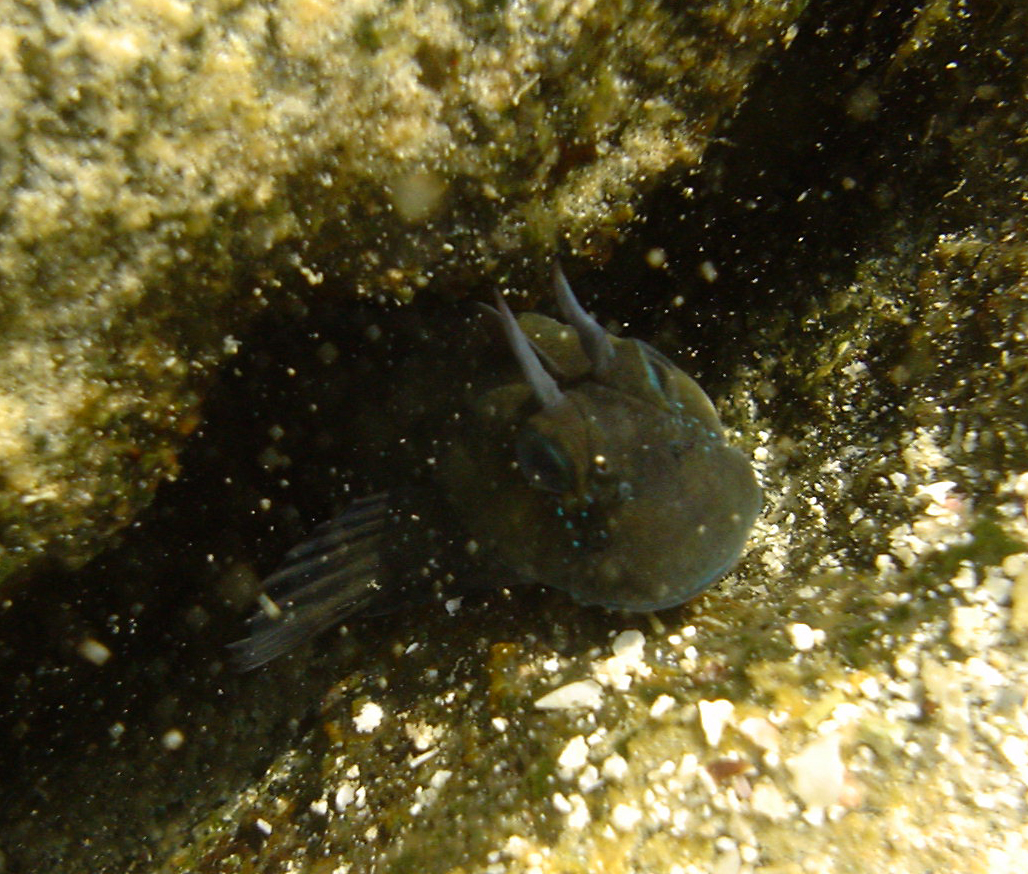
Blenny in Kona, Hawaii

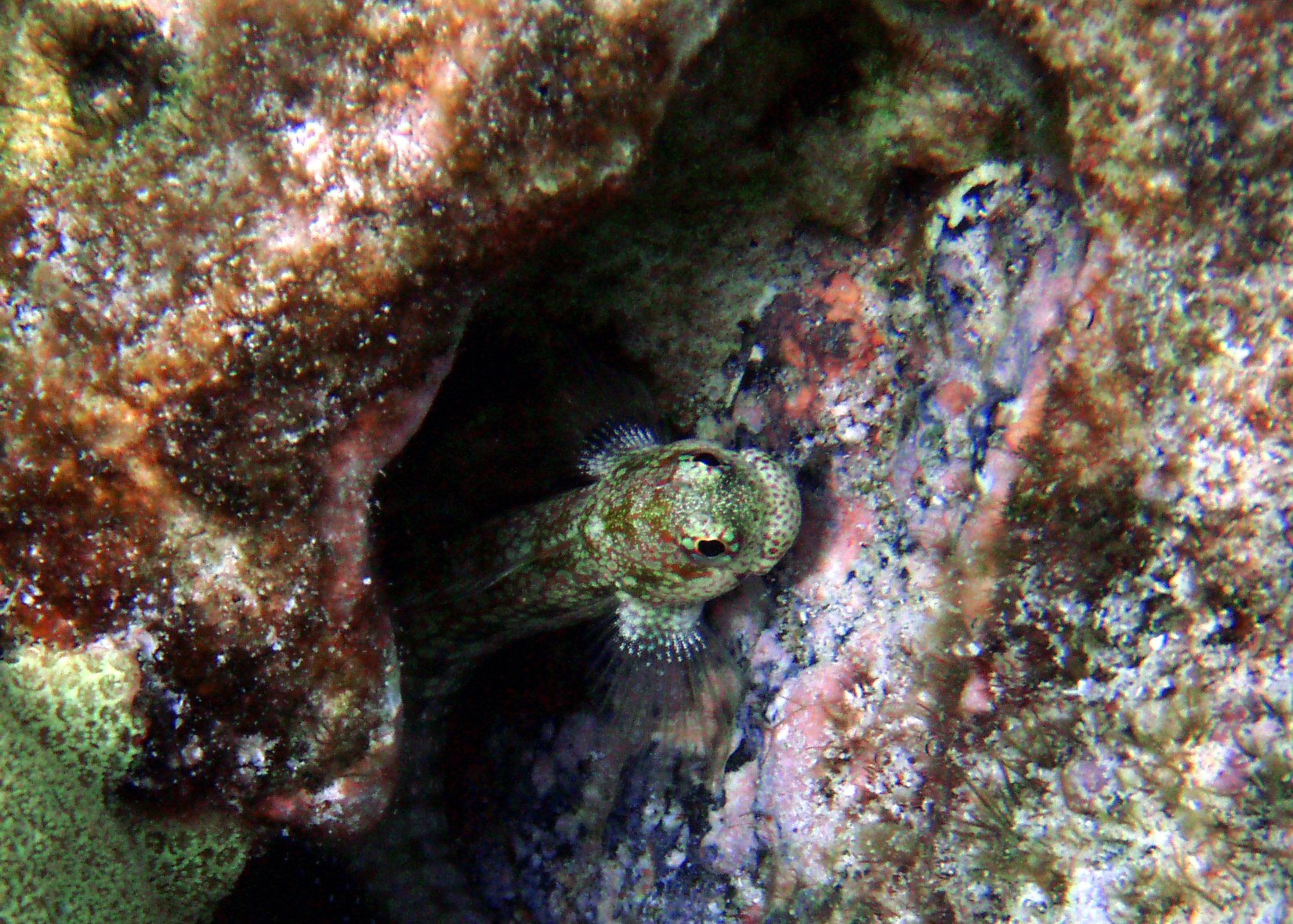
Blenny in Kona, Hawaii

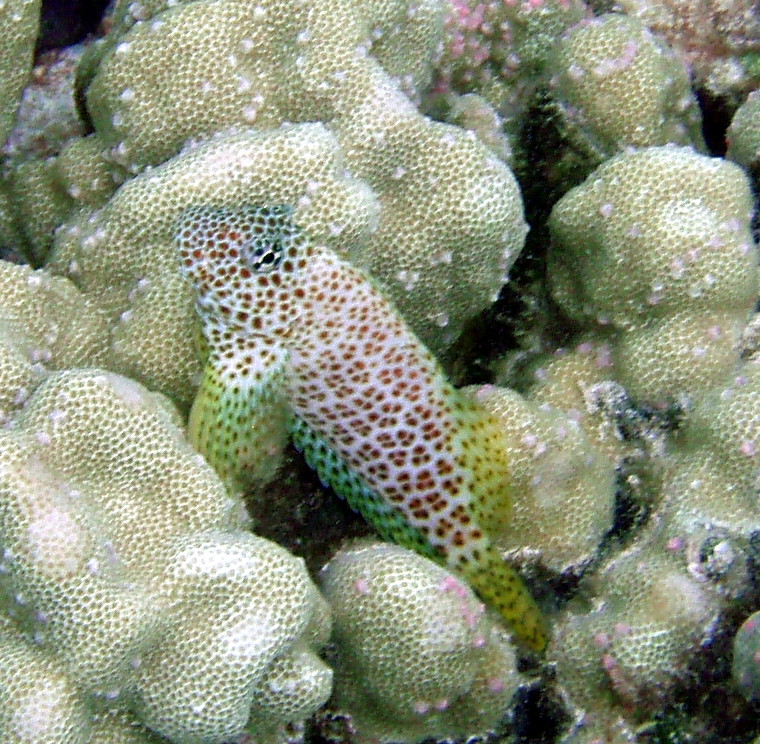
Blenny in Kona, Hawaii

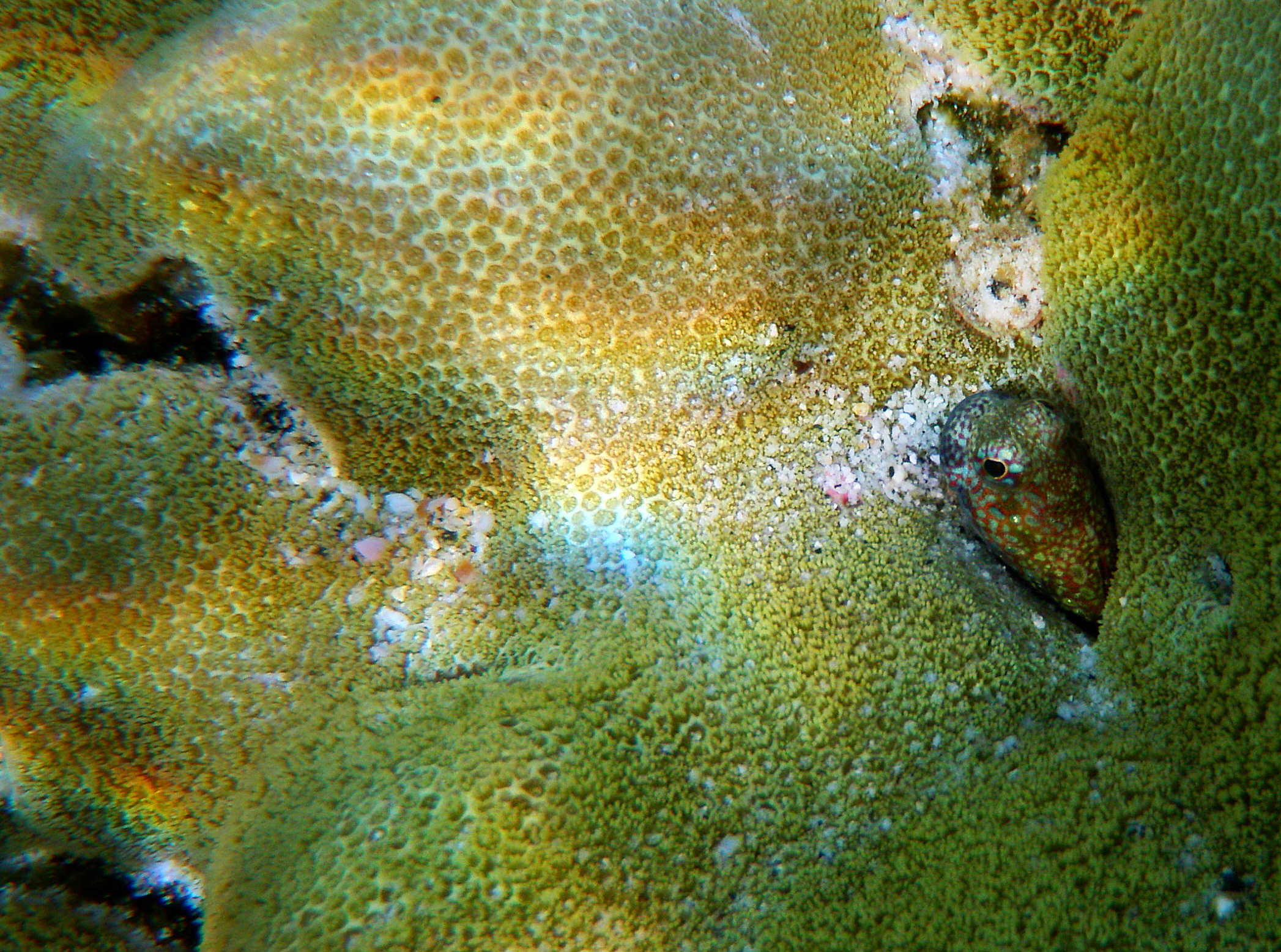
Bullethead rockskipper in Kona

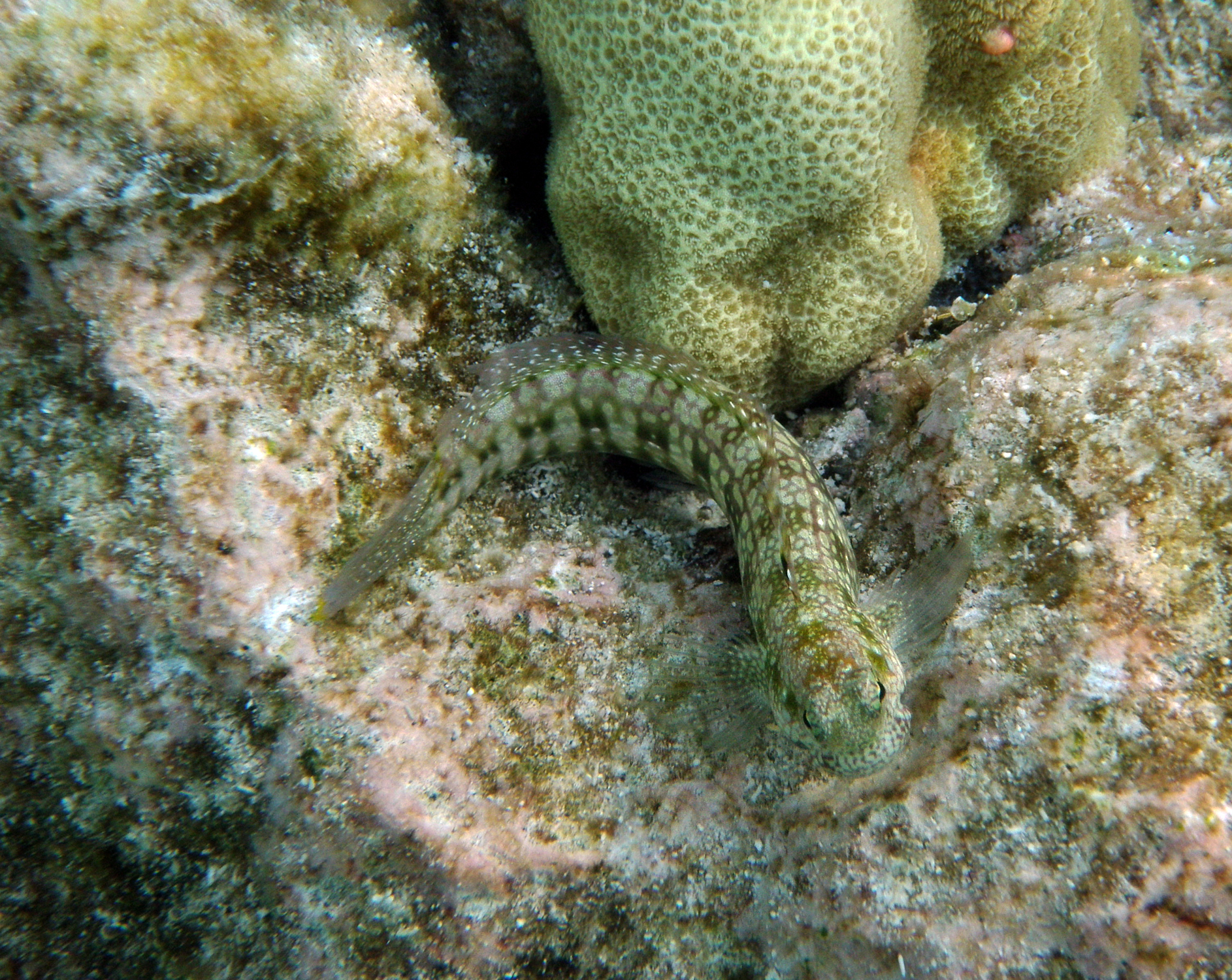
Marbled blenny, Entomacrodus marmoratus in Kona
