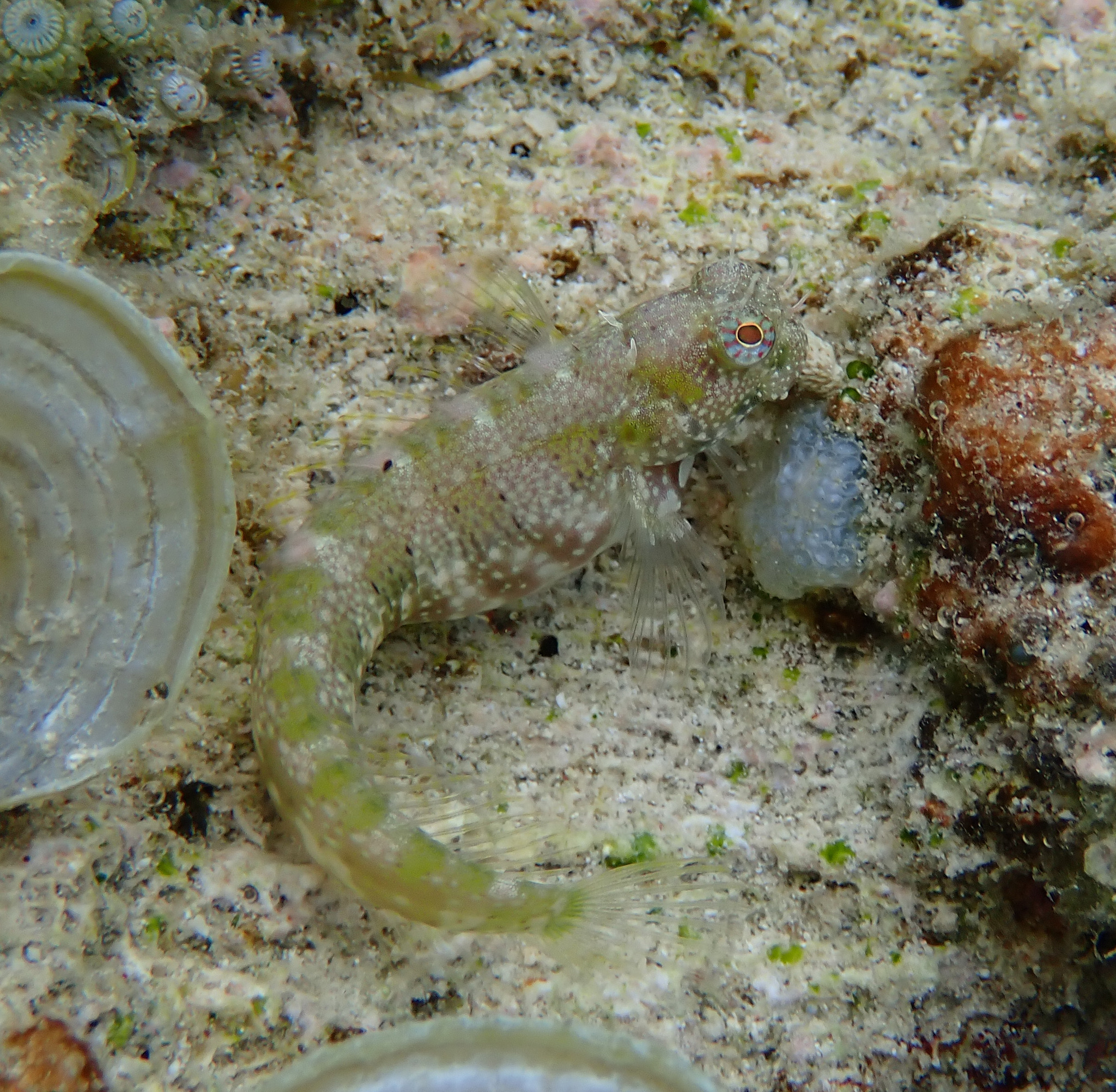

Conservation status
- Least Concern (IUCN 3.1)

Scientific classification
- Kingdom: Animalia
- Phylum: Chordata
- Class: Actinopterygii
- Order: Blenniiformes
- Family: Blenniidae
- Genus: Salarias
- Species: S. patzneri

Binomial name
- Salarias patzneri Bath, 1992

= Salarias patzneri =

Species of fish

Salarias patzneri, Patzner's blenny, is a species of combtooth blenny found in coral reefs in the western central Pacific ocean. This species can reach a length of 5.5 centimetres (2.2 in) TL. The specific name honours the Austrian ichthyologist Robert A. Patzner who worked on the genitalia of blennies and who shared specimens with Hans Bath.
