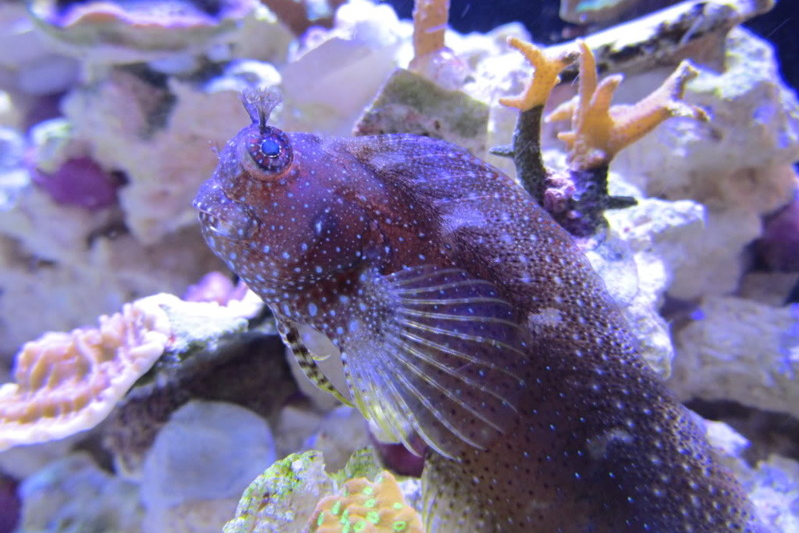

Conservation status
- Least Concern (IUCN 3.1)

Scientific classification
- Kingdom: Animalia
- Phylum: Chordata
- Class: Actinopterygii
- Order: Blenniiformes
- Family: Blenniidae
- Genus: Salarias
- Species: S. ramosus

Binomial name
- Salarias ramosus Bath, 1992

= Salarias ramosus =

Species of fish

Salarias ramosus, the starry blenny, is a species of combtooth blenny from the Western Central Pacific. It occasionally makes its way into the aquarium trade. This species can reach a length of 14 centimetres (5.5 in) TL.
