= Salarias obscurus =

Conservation status
- Least Concern (IUCN 3.1)

Scientific classification
- Kingdom: Animalia
- Phylum: Chordata
- Class: Actinopterygii
- Order: Blenniiformes
- Family: Blenniidae
- Genus: Salarias
- Species: S. obscurus

Binomial name
- Salarias obscurus Bath, 1992

Species of fish

Salarias obscurus is a species of combtooth blenny found in the western central Pacific ocean.
