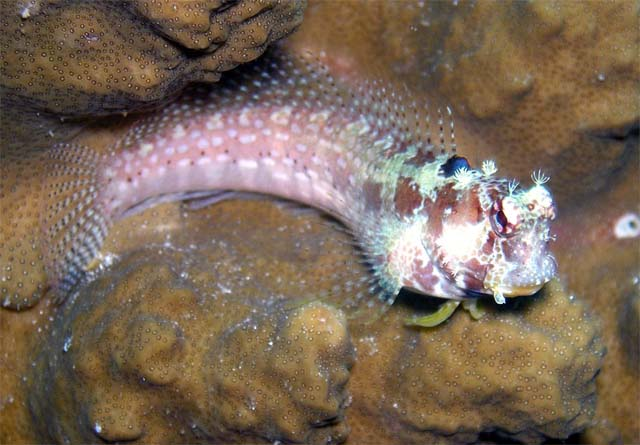

Conservation status
- Least Concern (IUCN 3.1)

Scientific classification
- Kingdom: Animalia
- Phylum: Chordata
- Class: Actinopterygii
- Order: Blenniiformes
- Family: Blenniidae
- Genus: Salarias
- Species: S. alboguttatus

Binomial name
- Salarias alboguttatus Kner, 1867

= Salarias alboguttatus =

Species of fish

Salarias alboguttatus, the whitespotted blenny, is a species of combtooth blenny found in coral reefs in the Pacific Ocean and Indian Ocean. This species reaches a length of 9 centimetres (3.5 in) TL.
