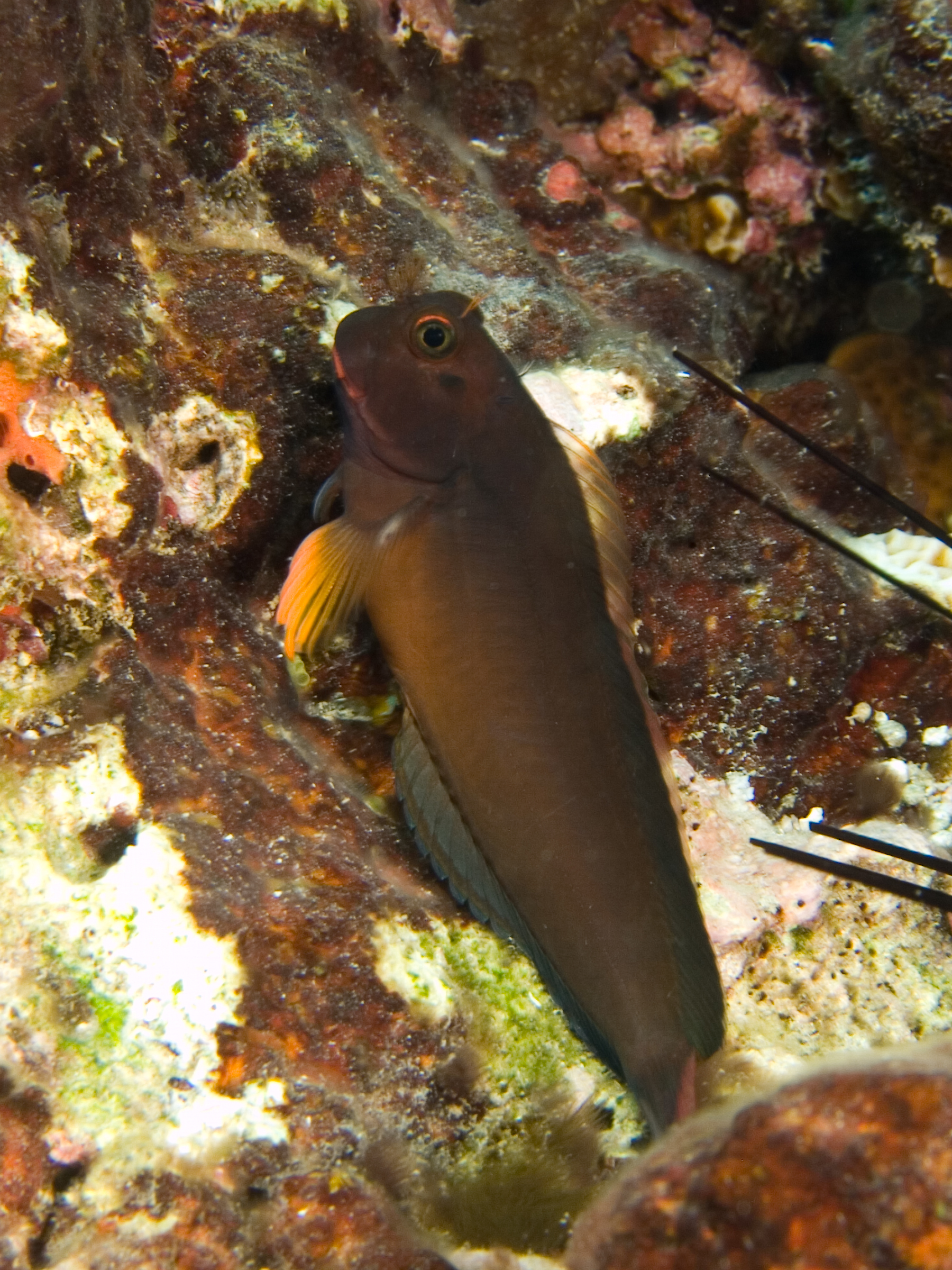

Conservation status
- Least Concern (IUCN 3.1)

Scientific classification
- Kingdom: Animalia
- Phylum: Chordata
- Class: Actinopterygii
- Division: Teleostei
- Order: Blenniiformes
- Family: Blenniidae
- Genus: Ophioblennius
- Species: O. macclurei

Binomial name
- Ophioblennius macclurei (Silvester, 1915)

Synonyms
- Rupiscartes macclurei Silvester, 1915

= Ophioblennius macclurei =

Species of fish

Ophioblennius macclurei, the redlip blenny, is a species of combtooth blenny found in coral reefs in the western Atlantic ocean. This species reaches a length of 12.2 centimetres (4.8 in) TL. The specific name honours the American comparative anatomist and embryologist Charles Freeman Williams McClure (1865–1955) in recognition of his work on the lymphatic systems of fishes.
