= Salarias nigrocinctus =

Conservation status
- Least Concern (IUCN 3.1)

Scientific classification
- Kingdom: Animalia
- Phylum: Chordata
- Class: Actinopterygii
- Order: Blenniiformes
- Family: Blenniidae
- Genus: Salarias
- Species: S. nigrocinctus

Binomial name
- Salarias nigrocinctus Bath, 1996

Species of fish

Salarias nigrocinctus, the blackstreaked blenny, is a species of combtooth blenny found in the Pacific ocean, around Tonga.
