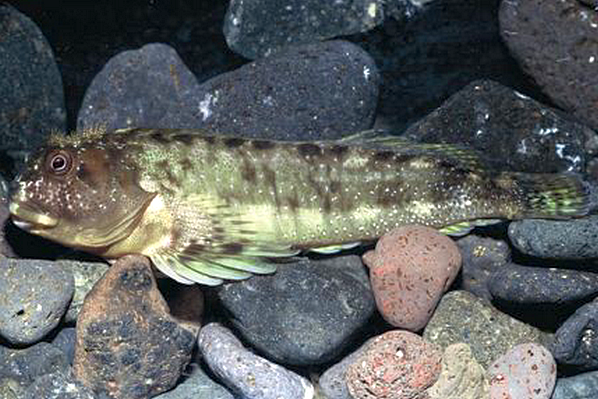

Conservation status
- Least Concern (IUCN 3.1)

Scientific classification
- Kingdom: Animalia
- Phylum: Chordata
- Class: Actinopterygii
- Order: Blenniiformes
- Family: Blenniidae
- Genus: Ophioblennius
- Species: O. trinitatis

Binomial name
- Ophioblennius trinitatis A. Miranda-Ribeiro, 1919

= Ophioblennius trinitatis =

Subspecies of fish

Ophioblennius trinitatis is a species of combtooth blenny endemic to the southwest Atlantic ocean. It is a subtropical marine fish commonly found in reefs off the coast of Brazil. Combtooth blennies are often referred to as "peixes-macacos" in Brazil, which translates to "monkey-fish".

This species reaches a length of 5.6 centimetres (2.2 in) SL.

== Anatomy and morphology ==
Combtooth blennies are small, scaleless fish that are characterized by comb-like teeth in the jaw. A single row of comb-like teeth are found on the dentary and premaxilla but are absent on the palatine bone. In addition to comb-like teeth, many combtooth blennies have recurved, fang-like caniniform teeth at the rear end of each dentary.

Ophioblennius trinitatis have a blunt head and large eyes positioned high on the head. A blue coloration borders each eye and a dark-brown spot, similar in size to the diameter of the pupil, is located after the eyeball.

The anatomy of Ophioblennius trinitatis differs from other species of Ophioblennius in that it has 22 segmented dorsal-fin rays and 23 segmented anal-fin rays. This species reaches a length of 5.6 centimetres (2.2 in) SL.

Adult Ophioblennius trinitatis have a homogenous brown color pattern with pale yellow fins. In stressful situations, the color pattern changes to a mix of irregular bands that alternate between dark and light. Juveniles, however, are bicolored: the anterior half is an olive green, while the posterior half is yellow.

== Habitat ==
Ophioblennius trinitatis are commonly found in intertidal habitats and tropical coral reefs of Brazil at depths of up to 53 meters. Although adult Ophioblennius trinitatis are restricted to shallow waters, dwelling among rocks and corals, larvae can be found in deep waters. Ophioblennius trinitatis prefer areas with substrate of high structural complexity and ample hiding places.

== Feeding behavior ==
Ophioblennius trinitatis are primary consumers; their diet consists of detritus, turf algae, filamentous algae, red calcareous algae, ascidians, and a variety of invertebrates. Ophioblennius trinitatis are able to co-exist with other species by feeding more often in the morning than in the afternoon, an example of a resource partitioning strategy.

Juveniles feed more often than adults due to the higher energy demand required of development. Larger Ophioblennius trinitatis have a lower feeding rate because they spend more time patrolling feeding and breeding territories.

== Behavior ==
Ophioblennius trinitatis are diurnal and territorial herbivores. They are aggressive towards other fish when fighting for resources. Ophioblennius trinitatis respond differently depending on the species of fish that intrudes their territory. They employ agonistic displays when interacting with other highly territorial species that share similar habitat and food preferences.

Ophioblennius trinitatis rarely have intraspecific agonistic interactions. Instead, they demonstrate intraspecific symbiotic sharing of territories in order to improve territory defense and minimize the energy cost of agonistic behavior.

Larger individuals of Ophioblennius trinitatis are more aggressive because they defend larger territories, which experience more frequent intruders.

Ophioblennius trinitatis also have more agonistic interactions when competing over refuge places (i.e. crevices).

== Reproduction ==
Ophioblennius trinitatis are oviparous and have a year-long reproductive period. Additionally, the spawning and settlement of Ophioblennius trinitatis is seasonal and follows lunar periodicity.

Male Ophioblennius trinitatis have nests within their territory for spawning, and when the full moon approaches, females seek male nests for mating. After spawning, the males guard the nest to keep eggs safe.

Ophioblennius trinitatis eggs are demersal and are attached to substrate using an adhesive pad or pedestal.
