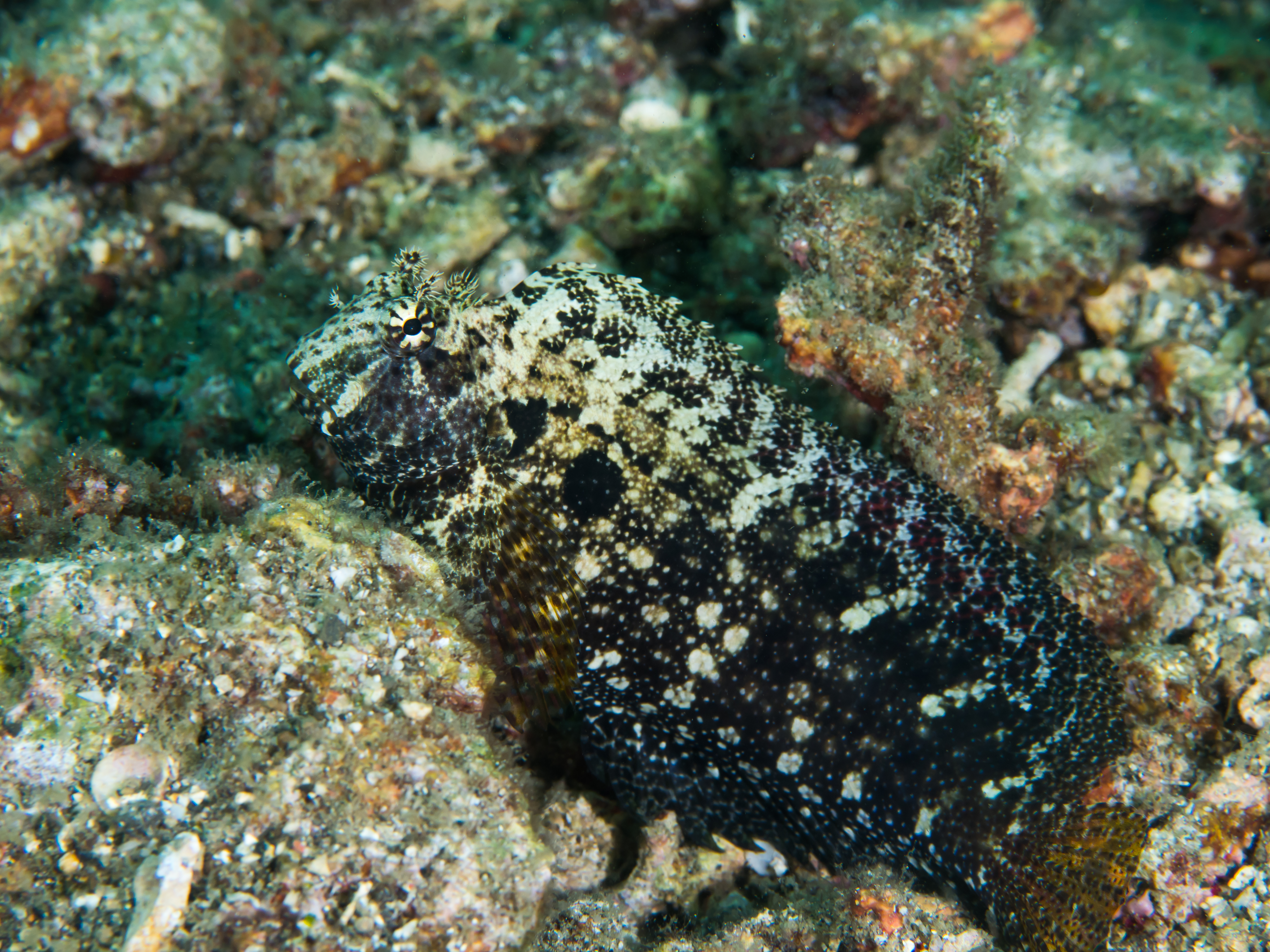

Conservation status
- Least Concern (IUCN 3.1)

Scientific classification
- Kingdom: Animalia
- Phylum: Chordata
- Class: Actinopterygii
- Order: Blenniiformes
- Family: Blenniidae
- Genus: Salarias
- Species: S. ceramensis

Binomial name
- Salarias ceramensis Bleeker, 1853

= Salarias ceramensis =

Species of fish

Salarias ceramensis, the Seram blenny or Ceram blenny, is a species of combtooth blenny found in the western central Pacific ocean. This species reaches a length of 15 centimetres (5.9 in) TL.

Salarias ceramensis is a shallow-water species (depth range 1–30 m) found in sheltered bays and lagoons, often among mixed algae and coral rubble, in silty habitats. It is present in aquarium trade and subject to minor commercial fisheries.
