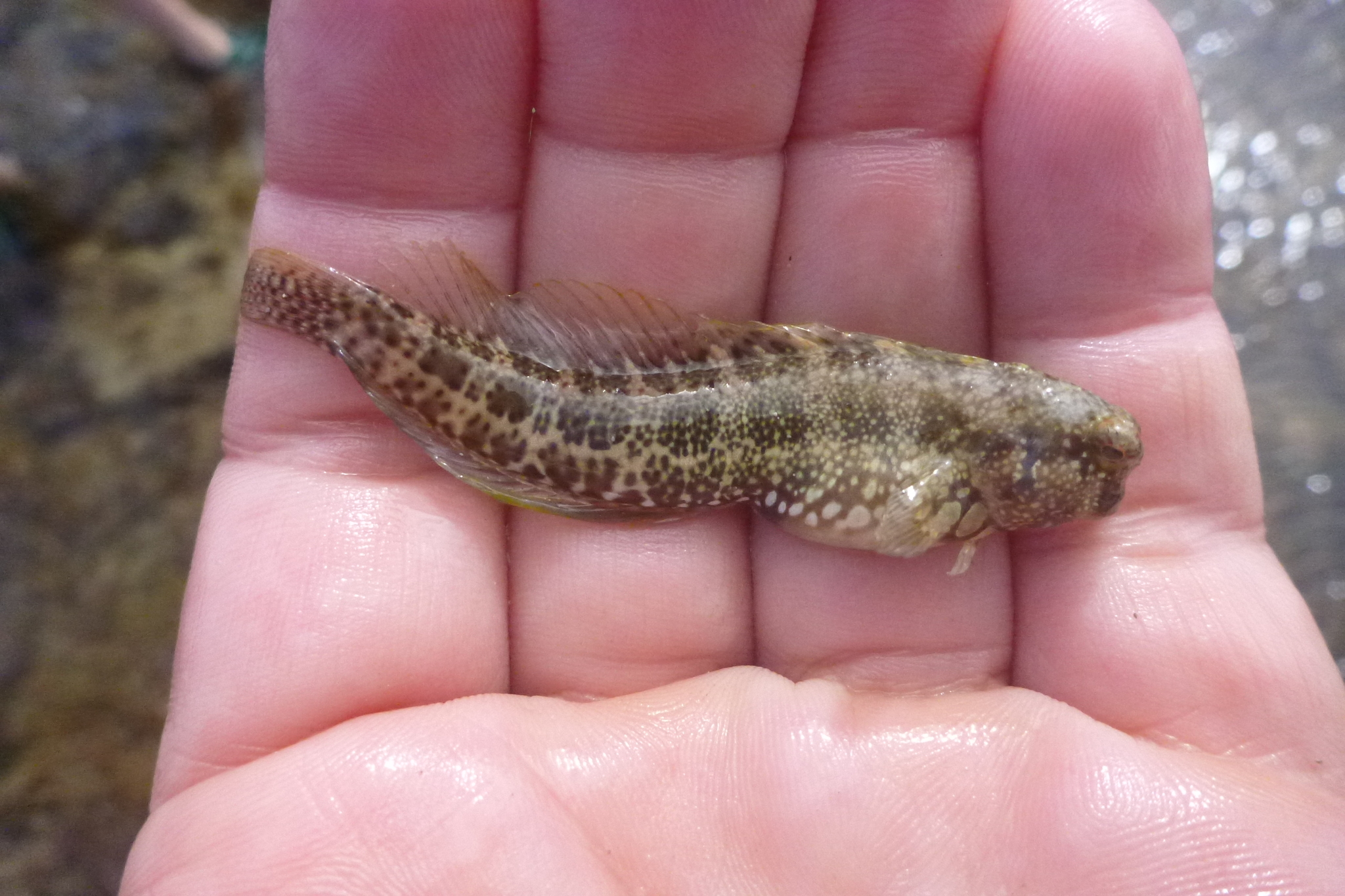

Conservation status
- Least Concern (IUCN 3.1)

Scientific classification
- Kingdom: Animalia
- Phylum: Chordata
- Class: Actinopterygii
- Order: Blenniiformes
- Family: Blenniidae
- Genus: Salarias
- Species: S. guttatus

Binomial name
- Salarias guttatus Valenciennes, 1836

= Salarias guttatus =

Species of fish

Salarias guttatus, the breast-spot blenny or the blue-spot blenny, is a species of combtooth blenny found in the western Pacific Ocean. This species reaches a length of 10 centimetres (3.9 in) TL.
