= Salarias segmentatus =

Conservation status
- Least Concern (IUCN 3.1)

Scientific classification
- Kingdom: Animalia
- Phylum: Chordata
- Class: Actinopterygii
- Order: Blenniiformes
- Family: Blenniidae
- Genus: Salarias
- Species: S. segmentatus

Binomial name
- Salarias segmentatus Bath & J. E. Randall, 1991

Species of fish

Salarias segmentatus is a species of combtooth blenny from the Western Central Pacific. It occasionally makes its way into the aquarium trade. This species reaches a length of 11 centimetres (4.3 in) TL.
