= Salarias luctuosus =

Conservation status
- Least Concern (IUCN 3.1)

Scientific classification
- Kingdom: Animalia
- Phylum: Chordata
- Class: Actinopterygii
- Order: Blenniiformes
- Family: Blenniidae
- Genus: Salarias
- Species: S. luctuosus

Binomial name
- Salarias luctuosus Whitley, 1929

Species of fish

Salarias luctuosus is a species of combtooth blenny found in coral reefs in the northwest Pacific ocean. This species reaches a length of 5 centimetres (2.0 in) SL.
