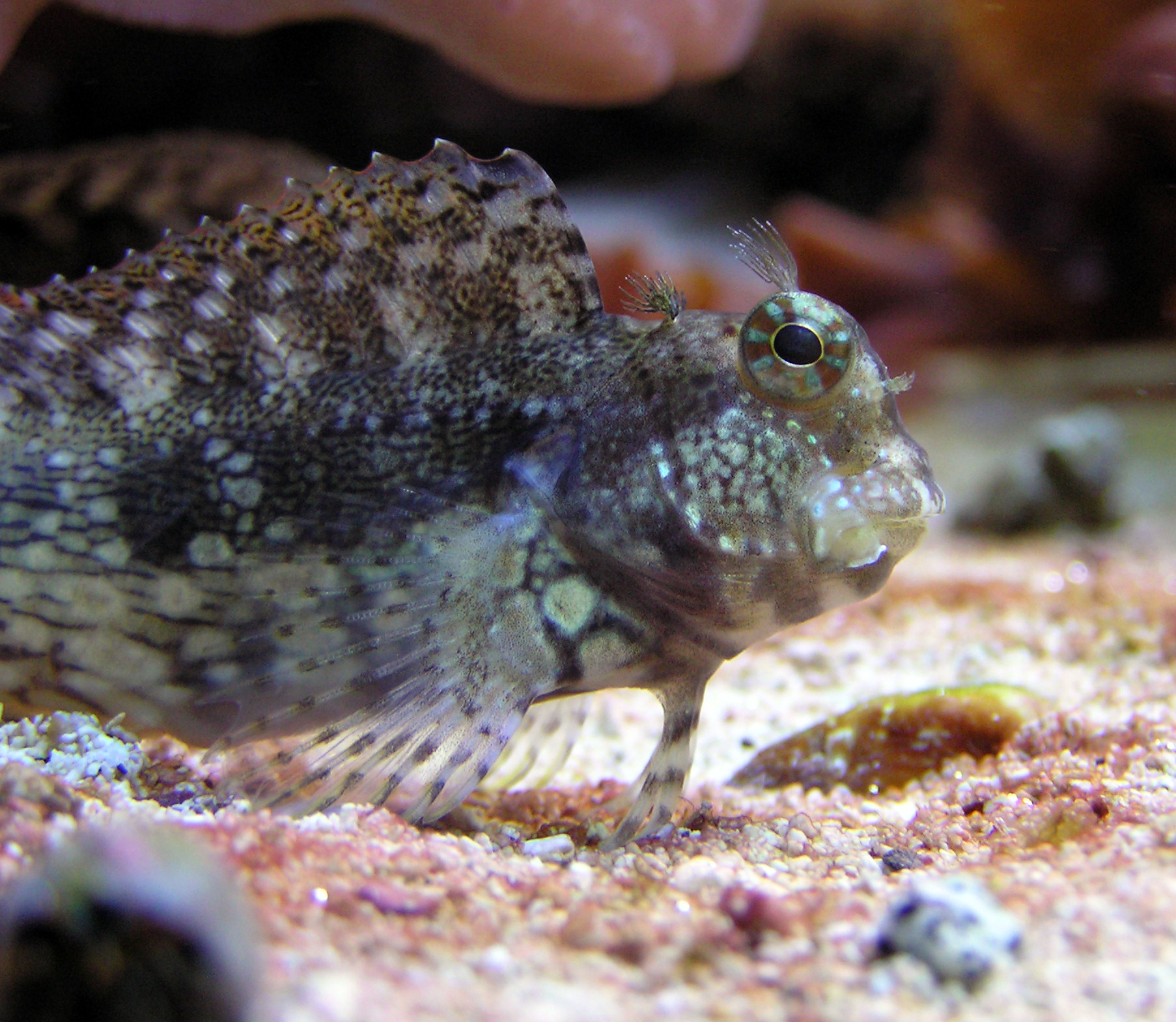
- Jewelled Blenny (S. fasciatus)

Scientific classification
- Domain: Eukaryota
- Kingdom: Animalia
- Phylum: Chordata
- Class: Actinopterygii
- Order: Blenniiformes
- Family: Blenniidae
- Subfamily: Salarinae
- Genus: Salarias; G. Cuvier, 1816

Type species
- Salarias quadripennis Cuvier, 1816

= Salarias =

Genus of fishes

Salarias is a genus of combtooth blennies found in the Indian and Pacific oceans.

== Species ==
There are currently 13 recognized species in this genus:

- Salarias alboguttatus Kner, 1867 (White-spotted blenny)
- Salarias ceramensis Bleeker, 1853 (Seram blenny)
- Salarias fasciatus (Bloch, 1786) (Jewelled blenny)
- Salarias guttatus Valenciennes, 1836 (Breast-spot blenny)
- Salarias luctuosus Whitley, 1929
- Salarias nigrocinctus Bath, 1996
- Salarias obscurus Bath, 1992
- Salarias patzneri Bath, 1992 (Patzner's blenny)
- Salarias ramosus Bath, 1992 (Starry blenny)
- Salarias segmentatus Bath & J. E. Randall, 1991 (Segmented blenny)
- Salarias sexfilum Günther, 1861
- Salarias sibogai Bath, 1992
- Salarias sinuosus Snyder, 1908 (Fringelip blenny)
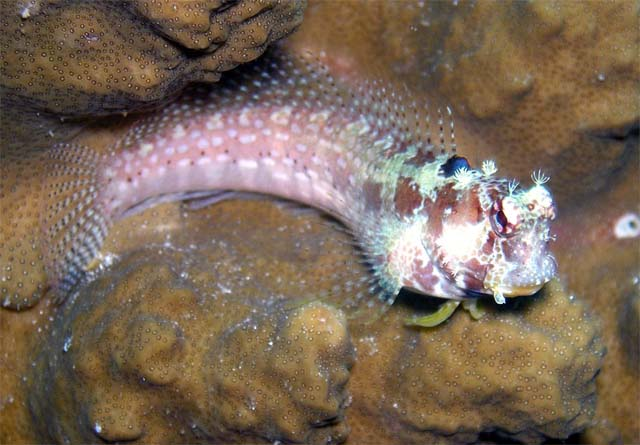
Salarias alboguttatus

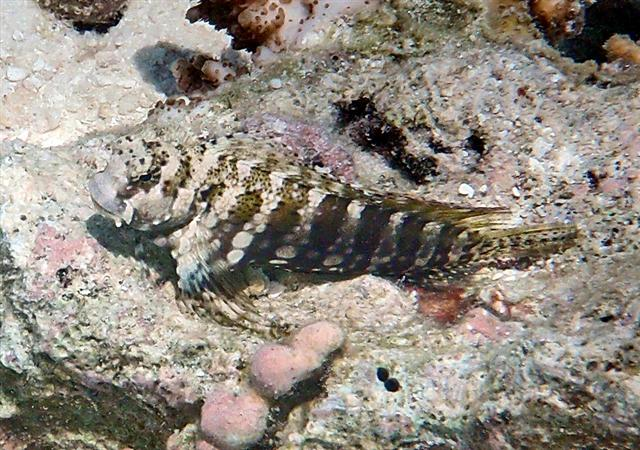
Salarias fasciatus

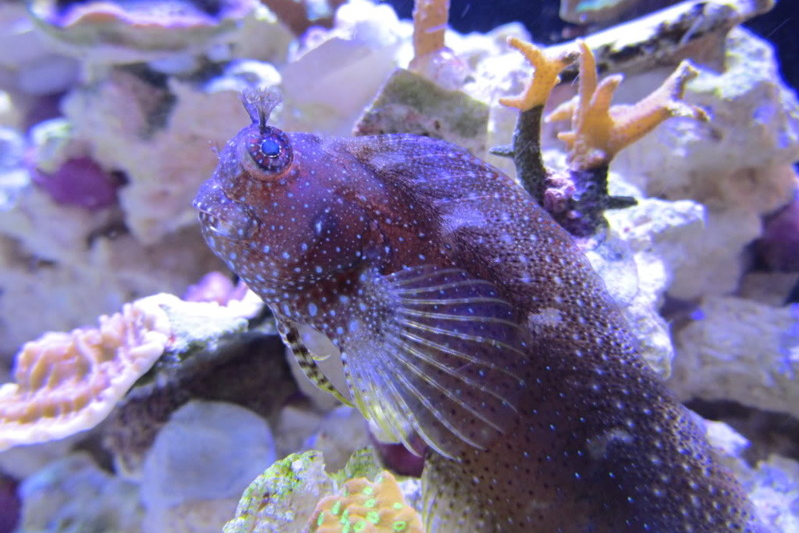
Salarias ramosus

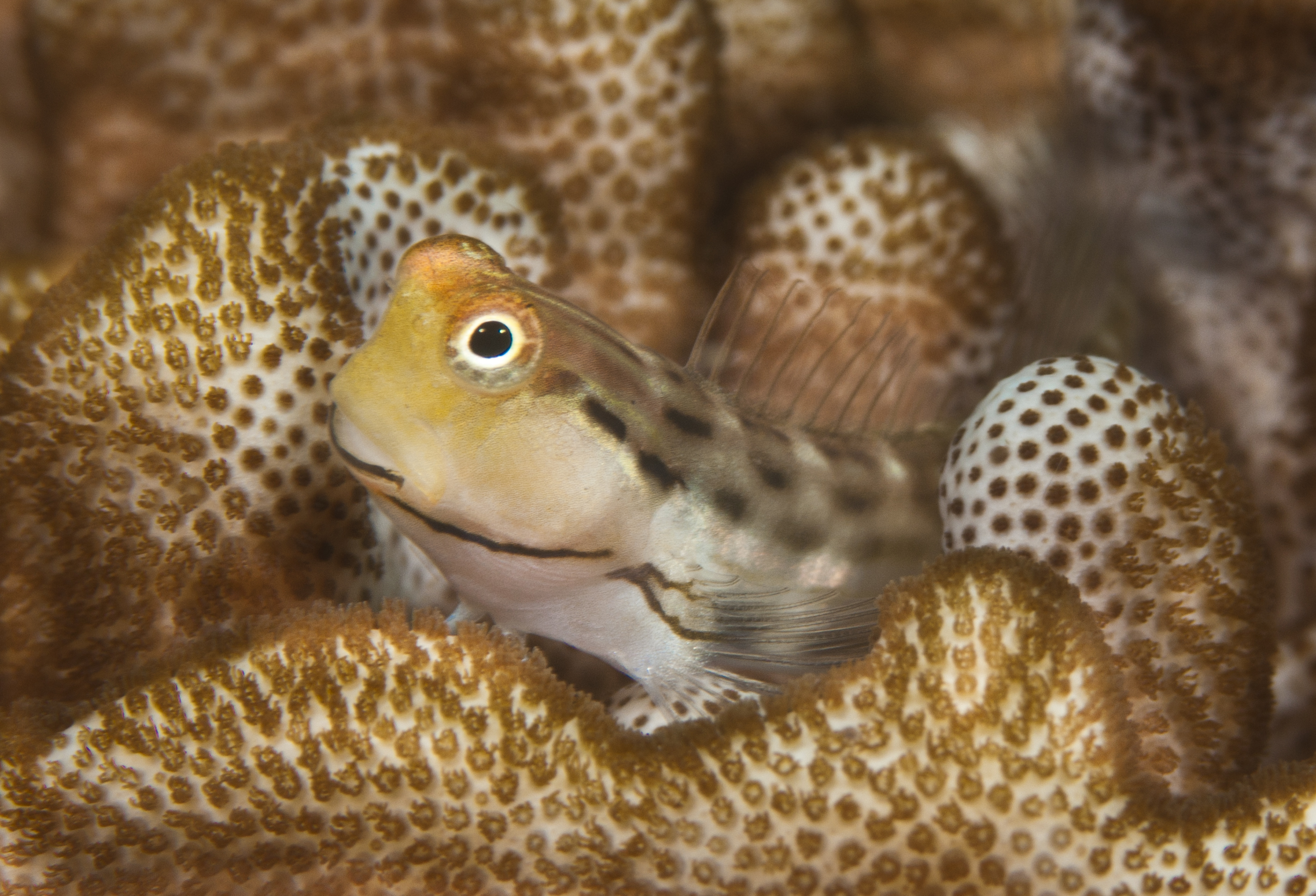
Salarias sinuosus
