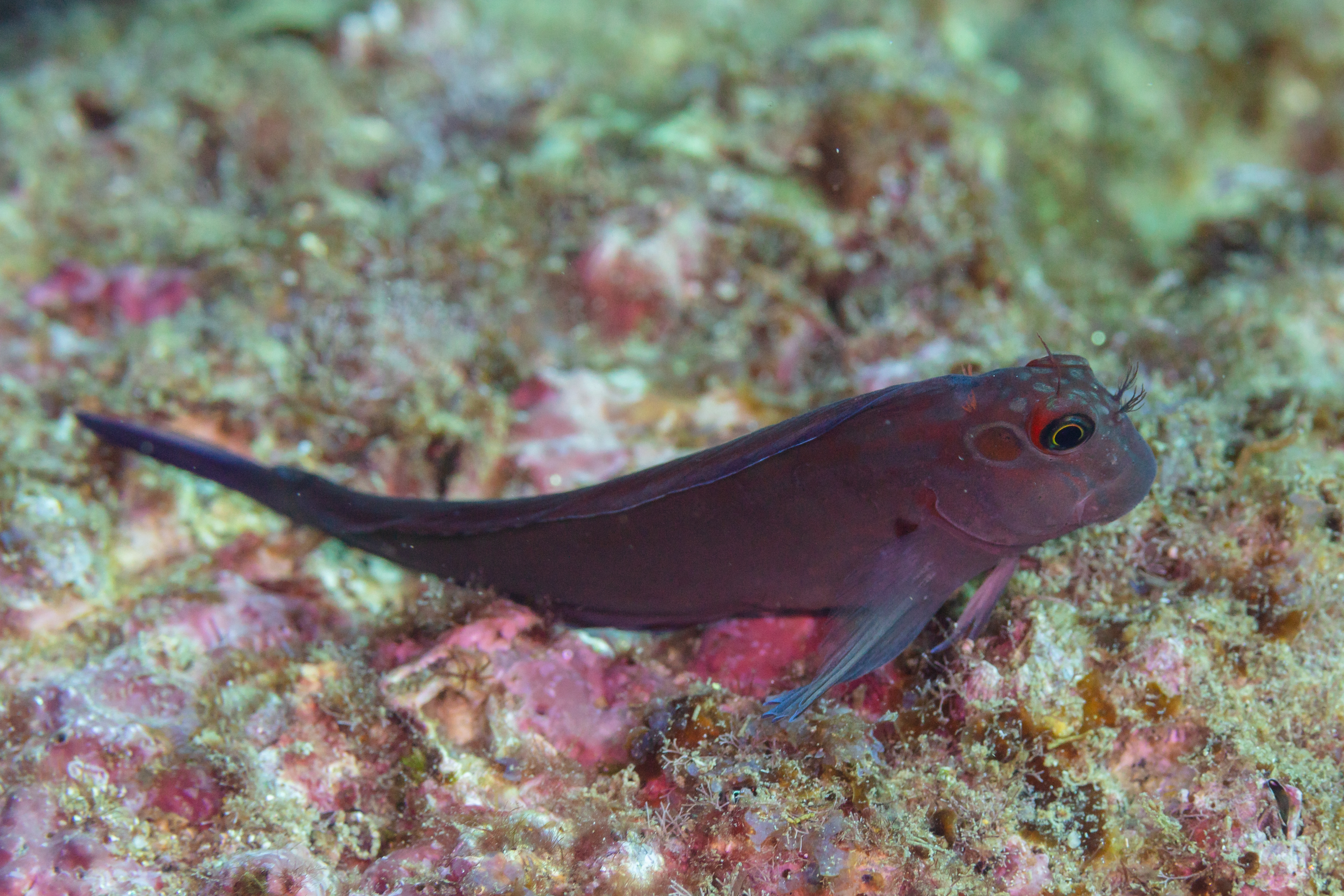
- Ophioblennius atlanticus

Scientific classification
- Kingdom: Animalia
- Phylum: Chordata
- Class: Actinopterygii
- Order: Blenniiformes
- Family: Blenniidae
- Subfamily: Salariinae
- Genus: Ophioblennius; T. N. Gill, 1860

Type species
- Blennophis webbii Valenciennes, 1843

Synonyms
- Blennophis Valenciennes, 1843; Cynoscartes Norman, 1944; Hepatoscartes Fowler, 1944; Labroblennius Borodin, 1928

= Ophioblennius =

Genus of fishes

Ophioblennius is a genus of combtooth blennies native to the Atlantic and to the Pacific coasts of the Americas.

== Species ==
There are currently five recognized species in this genus:

- Ophioblennius atlanticus (Valenciennes, 1836) (Horseface blenny)
- Ophioblennius clippertonensis V. G. Springer, 1962 (Clipperton blenny)
- Ophioblennius macclurei (Silvester, 1915) (Redlip blenny)
- Ophioblennius steindachneri D. S. Jordan & Evermann, 1898 (Large-banded blenny)
- Ophioblennius trinitatus A. Miranda-Ribeiro, 1919 (Triple Blenny)

== Description ==
Ophioblennius blennies have cylindrical bodies and blunt heads with cirri. They can grow up to about 15 centimetres (5.9 in) long.

== Habitat ==
These blennies tend to live in shallow water, from 0–5.5 metres (0–18 ft).
