= Salarias sexfilum =

Conservation status
- Least Concern (IUCN 3.1)

Scientific classification
- Kingdom: Animalia
- Phylum: Chordata
- Class: Actinopterygii
- Order: Blenniiformes
- Family: Blenniidae
- Genus: Salarias
- Species: S. sexfilum

Binomial name
- Salarias sexfilum Günther, 1861

Species of fish

Salarias sexfilum (commonly known as Spalding's Blenny) is a species of combtooth blenny found in the western central Pacific ocean, particularly the shallow fringing reefs and tide pools of Australia and Indonesia.

== Description ==
The Spalding's Blenny is a greenish yellow and brown fish, peppered with spots across the upper half of the fish. It has double vertical brown bands along its belly and a pink ocellus on its chest. A typical adult is about 9-12 cm (3.5-4.7 in), with a crest on its head and a filmform tentacle right at the nostril, with elaborate cirri at the head.

The dorsal fin extends gradually higher than the beginning of the posterior third of the soft portion, creating an arch that seems to be continuous with the caudal fin. The pectoral fin nearly extends to the vent of the fish.

== Habitat ==
This species is found in parts of Western Australia, Northern Territory, and a small fraction of Queensland, where it is found between Exmouth Gulf and Gulf of Carpentaria. The blenny is also found commonly in Indonesia, particularly amongst the Lesser Sundra Islands and the Arafura sea.
