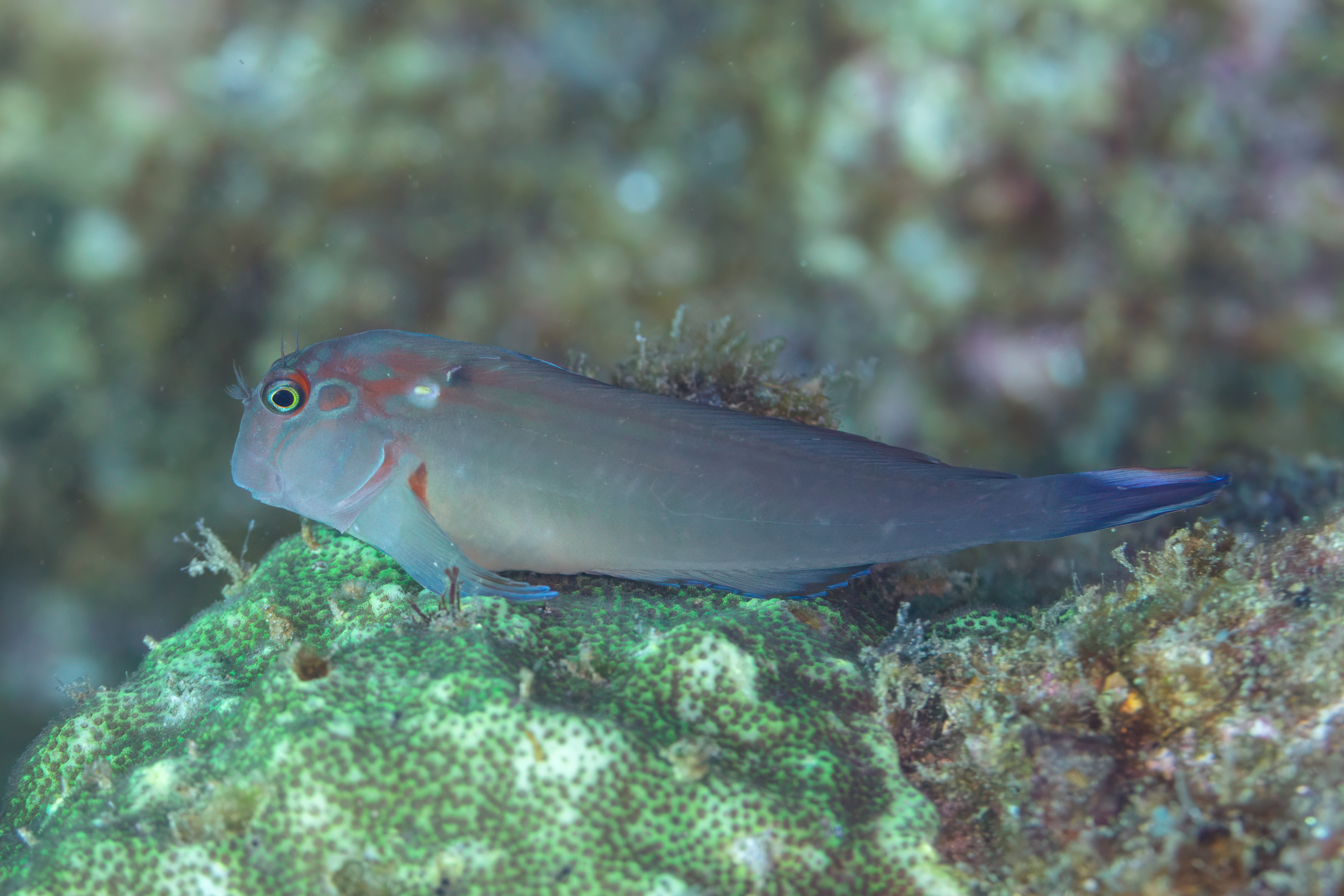

Conservation status
- Least Concern (IUCN 3.1)

Scientific classification
- Kingdom: Animalia
- Phylum: Chordata
- Class: Actinopterygii
- Order: Blenniiformes
- Family: Blenniidae
- Genus: Ophioblennius
- Species: O. steindachneri

Binomial name
- Ophioblennius steindachneri D. S. Jordan & Evermann, 1898

Synonyms
- Ophioblennius pinchoti Hildebrand, 1946

= Ophioblennius steindachneri =

Species of fish

Ophioblennius steindachneri, the large-banded blenny or the Panamic fanged blenny, is a species of combtooth blenny found in coral reefs in the eastern Pacific ocean. This species reaches a length of 18 centimetres (7.1 in) SL.

== Description ==
The large-banded blenny exhibits dark coloration as a juvenile, but develops brownish to olive coloration with lighter markings, as well as a dark spot behind the eye and several broad bands from the head and fading behind the pectoral fins.

== Distribution ==
Ophioblennius steindachneri is found in the eastern Pacific from the Gulf of California to Peru. Its range encompasses the Revillagigedo Islands, Cocos Island, Malpelo Island and the Galápagos Islands.

== Habitat and biology ==
The adults of Ophioblennius steindachneri are mainly found in the surge zone of exposed rocky headlands which have steep slopes where they wedge themselves into crevices near the shore in shallow water. They are territorial and will dart out of their hiding place to defend their territory. They feed during the day when they graze on algae and prey on sessile invertebrates by using the incisor teeth, which are similar in shape to combs, to scrape food off the rock. Like all blennies they are oviparous, laying demersal eggs which are adhered to the substrate by a filamentous, adhesive pad or pedestal and their larvae are planktonic which are frequently recorded from shallow waters near the coast.

== Etymology ==
The specific name honours the Austrian ichthyologist Franz Steindachner (1834-1919) who reported this species as Blennophis webbii in 1879.
