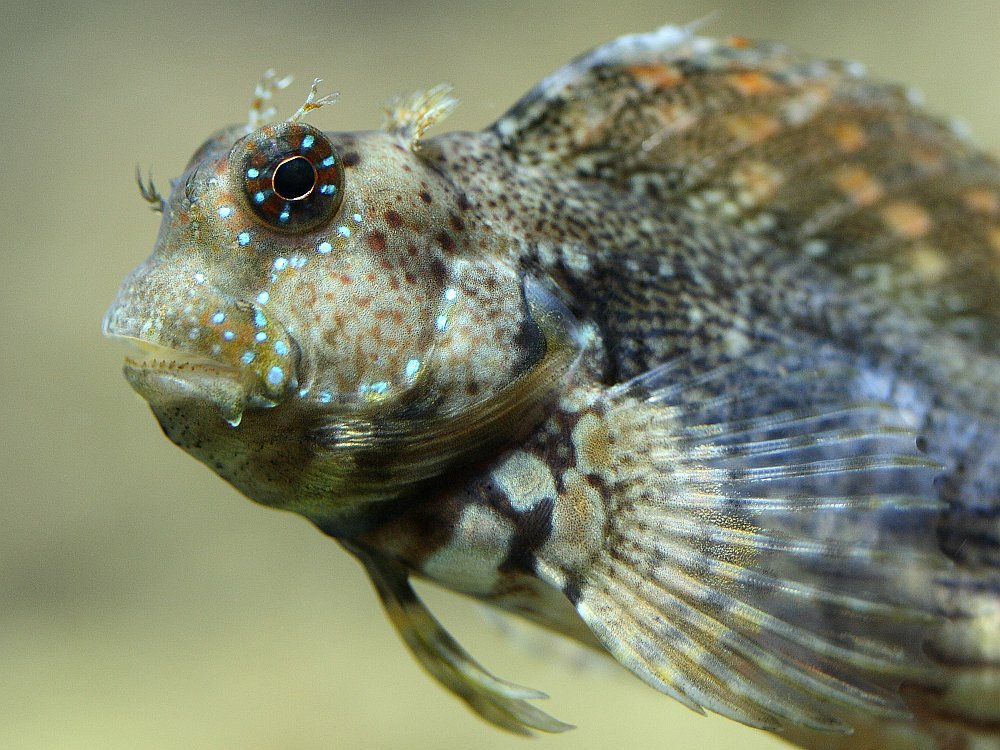

Conservation status
- Least Concern (IUCN 3.1)

Scientific classification
- Kingdom: Animalia
- Phylum: Chordata
- Class: Actinopterygii
- Order: Blenniiformes
- Family: Blenniidae
- Genus: Salarias
- Species: S. fasciatus

Binomial name
- Salarias fasciatus (Bloch, 1786)

Synonyms
- Blennius fasciatus Bloch, 1786; Salarias quadripennis Cuvier, 1816

= Salarias fasciatus =

Species of marine fish

Salarias fasciatus, commonly known as the jewelled blenny or lawnmower blenny is a benthic, neritic, marine fish species endemic to Australasia. Despite being known as the lawnmower blenny, due to its propensity to consume algae growth in aquaria, it is principally a detritivore, with plant material making up only about 15% of its diet. The lawnmower blenny camoflauges itself with its surroundings, even changing color to hide from predators.

== Description ==
Salarias fasciatus is typically olive to brown with dark bars and a large number of round or elongated white spots of different sizes. The blenny has many pale spots, dark streaks that run anteriorly, and several dark bands. It is a small fish, which reaches a maximum length of 14 centimetres (5.5 in) TL. It possesses no notch in its dorsal fin. The dorsal and anal fins are attached to the base of the caudal fin by a skin membrane. Adult males have elongated anterior rays on the anal fin. There are usually dark longitudinal lines on the front part of the body, and small bright blue spots with dark outlines along the rear part of the body.

== Distribution and habitat ==
The Salarias fasciatus lives in reefs at depths of 0–8 m (0–26 ft) from East Africa and the Red Sea to Samoa and the Islands of Micronesia. It is most often found on shallow reef flats that have heavy algae cover.

== Taxonomy ==
Georges Cuvier described this species as Salarias quadripennis in 1816 and named it as the type species of the genus Salarias but Cuvier's name was shown to be a junior synonym of Bloch's Blennius fasciatus.

== Gallery ==
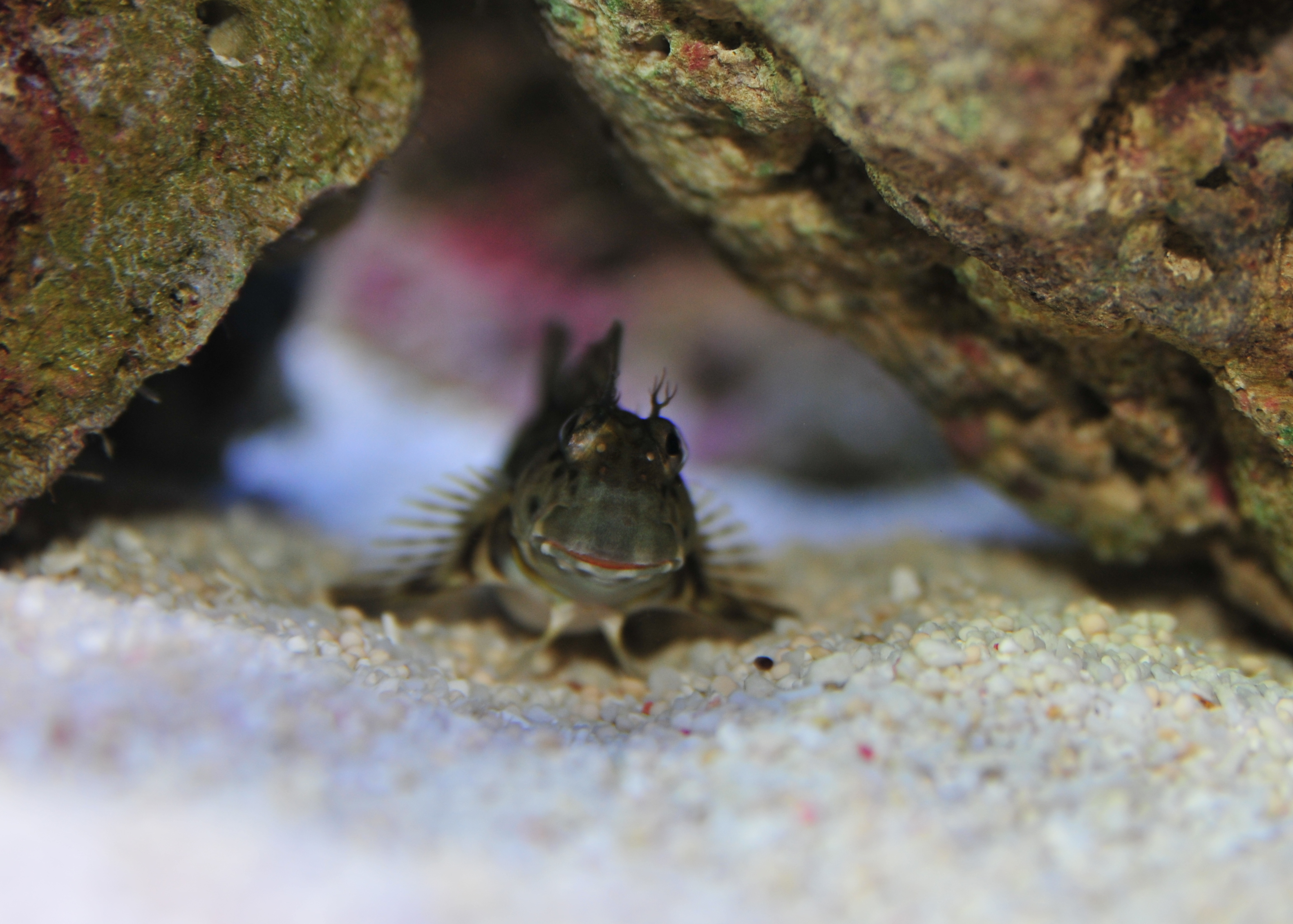

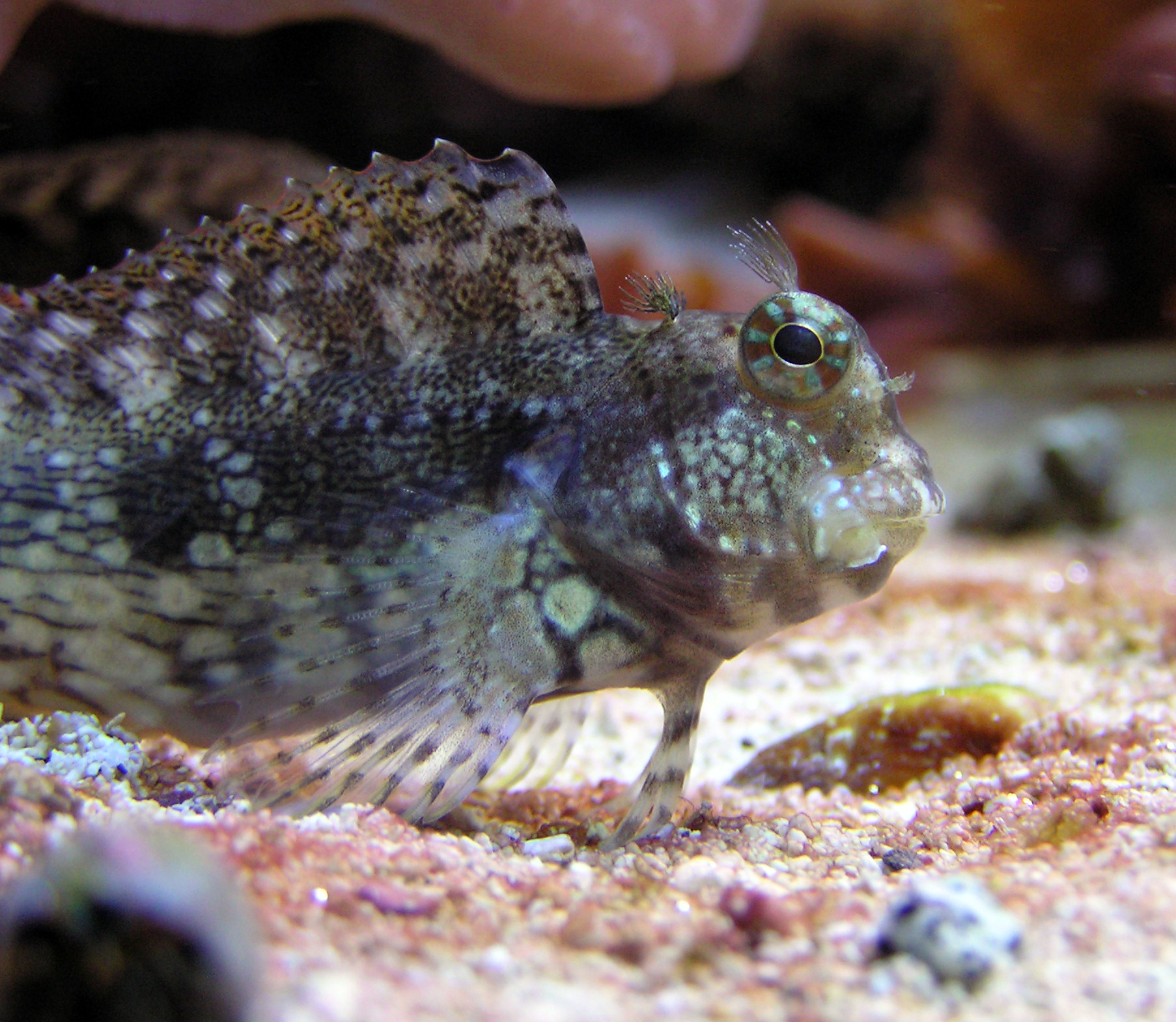

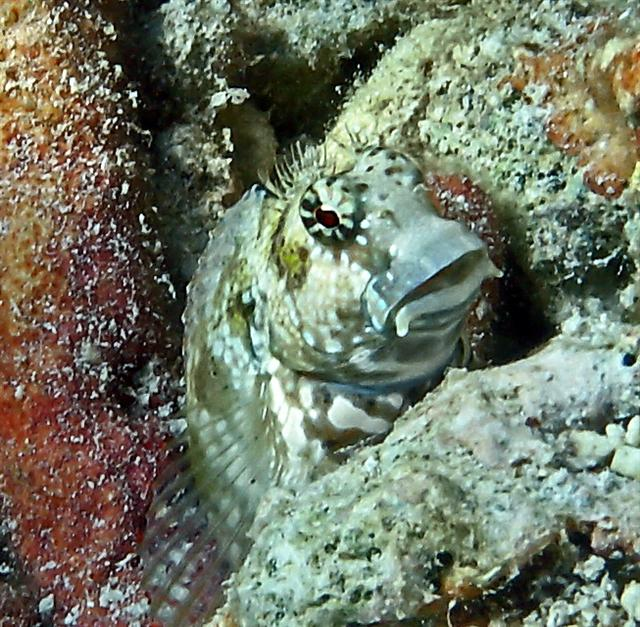

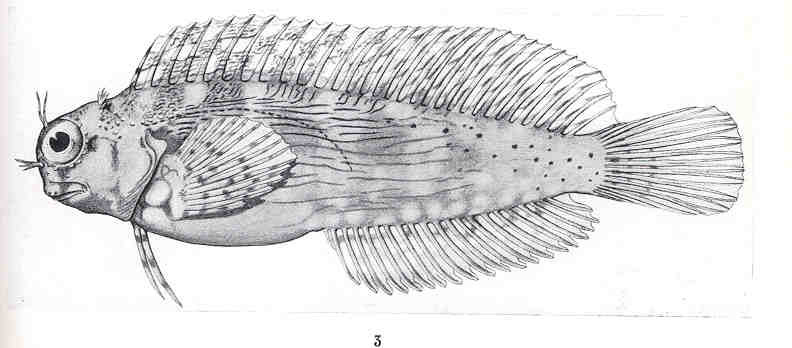
