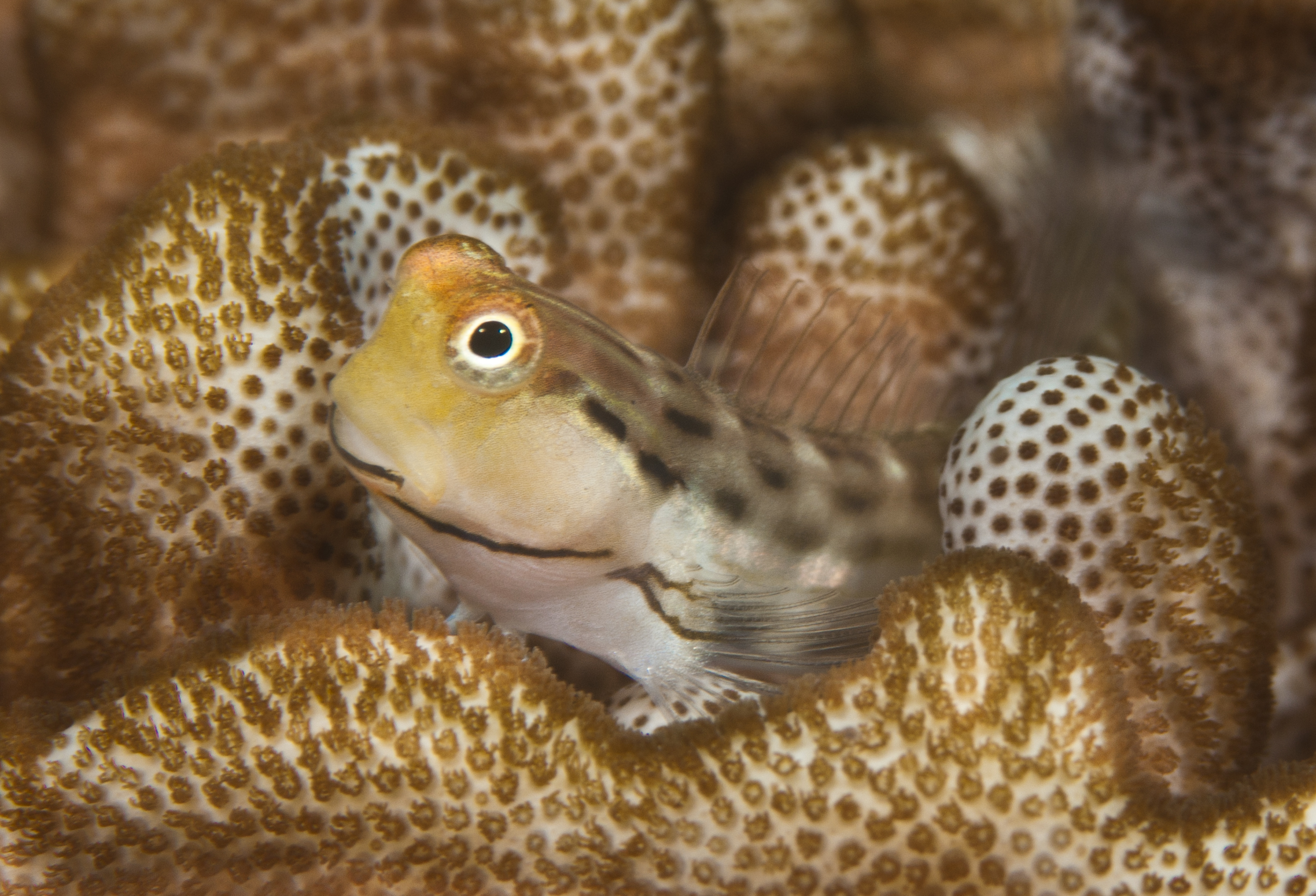
- Fringelip Blenny

Conservation status
- Least Concern (IUCN 3.1)

Scientific classification
- Kingdom: Animalia
- Phylum: Chordata
- Class: Actinopterygii
- Division: Teleostei
- Order: Blenniiformes
- Family: Blenniidae
- Genus: Salarias
- Species: S. sinuosus

Binomial name
- Salarias sinuosus Snyder, 1908

= Salarias sinuosus =

Species of fish

Salarias sinuosus, known commonly as the fringelip blenny or the crinkle-lipped blenny, is a species of combtooth blenny found in coral reefs in the Indian Ocean. This species reaches a length of 6 centimetres (2.4 in) TL.

== Description ==
A small fish, with maximum recorded size of about 6 cm. Body depth about 5.0 to 5,8 in length, supraorbital cirri long and unbranched, small cirri at nape. Lower lip margin smooth, upper lip crenulated. Dorsal fin notched between spiny and rayed sections, dorsal and anal fins attached to base of caudal fin by a membrane. Adult males have elongated anterior rays on the anal fin. Colour variable. Sides and back brown with eight darker brown bars and a row of small blue spots with dark outlines. The belly is reddish with four rows of closely spaced elongated whitish spots.

== Distribution ==
Western Pacific

== Habitat ==
Usually seen on tidal pools on coral reefs.
