= Ophioblennius clippertonensis =

Conservation status
- Vulnerable (IUCN 3.1)

Scientific classification
- Kingdom: Animalia
- Phylum: Chordata
- Class: Actinopterygii
- Order: Blenniiformes
- Family: Blenniidae
- Genus: Ophioblennius
- Species: O. clippertonensis

Binomial name
- Ophioblennius clippertonensis Springer, 1962

Species of fish

Ophioblennius clippertonensis is a species of combtooth blenny from the eastern Pacific Ocean which is endemic to Clipperton Island, a French minor territory off the coast of Central America. It can be found on rocky reefs which are subjected to the tidal surge.
