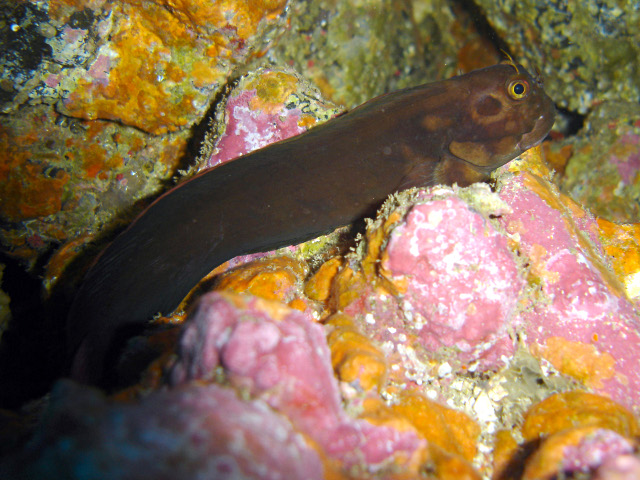

Conservation status
- Least Concern (IUCN 3.1)

Scientific classification
- Kingdom: Animalia
- Phylum: Chordata
- Class: Actinopterygii
- Order: Blenniiformes
- Family: Blenniidae
- Genus: Ophioblennius
- Species: O. atlanticus

Binomial name
- Ophioblennius atlanticus (Valenciennes, 1836)

Synonyms
- Salarias atlanticus Valenciennes, 1836; Blennius atlanticus (Valenciennes, 1836); Cynoscartes atlanticus (Valenciennes, 1836); Rupiscartes atlanticus (Valenciennes, 1836); Scartichthys atlanticus (Valenciennes, 1836); Blennophis webbii Valenciennes, 1843; Ophioblennius webbii (Valenciennes, 1843)

= Ophioblennius atlanticus =

Species of fish

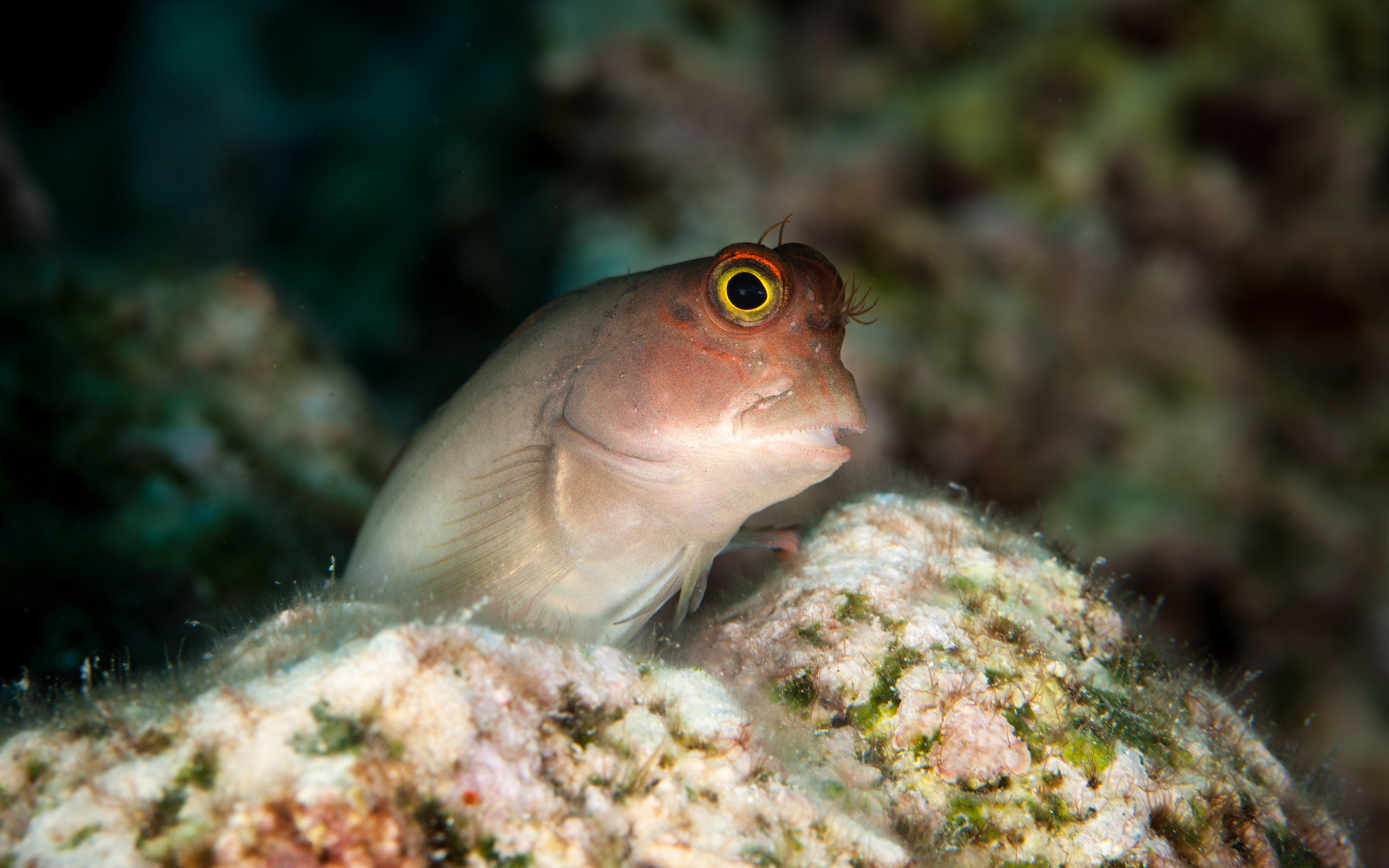
Ophioblennius atlanticus

Ophioblennius atlanticus, also known as the redlip blenny and the horseface blenny, is a species of combtooth blenny, family Blenniidae, found primarily in the western central Atlantic ocean. Redlip blennies can be found in coral crests and shallow fringing reefs. They are highly territorial and attack intruders with two long, sharp canine teeth. The adults are found at depths of 10 to 20 meters, and the eggs are benthic. The adults may reach up to four inches in length when fully grown, and they have large reddish lips, from which they attained their names. Redlip blennies largely feed on algae.

== Taxonomy ==
The species was originally described by French zoologist Achille Valenciennes in 1836. Ophis is Greek for "serpent", and blennios is Greek for "mucus". The species name atlanticus is the name for its location of capture. The common name, redlip, refers to the reddish color of its lips.

== Description ==
Adult redlip blennies can reach two to four inches in length. They are chocolate brown in appearance with some yellow markings, and possess blunt heads featuring four branching horns, and large reddish lips. A variation on the species is a paler form, having a shell-white body and reddish brown head.

== Distribution and habitat ==
Ophioblennius atlanticus is native to the tropical marine environments of the central Atlantic Ocean. Its range extends to the eastern Atlantic from Senegal to Angola, including offshore islands, in the northeastern Atlantic it is confined to the Macaronesian archipelagos of the Canary Islands, Madeira and the Azores. In the western Atlantic it is found off Bermuda and off the shores of North Carolina south through the West Indies to Brazil. It has been reporded twice in the central Mediterranean Sea. Ophioblennius atlanticus mostly inhabits shallow, clear waters with coral reefs and rock bottoms. Ophioblennius atlanticus adults are mostly found at depths of 10 to 20 meters, while their eggs are benthic.

== Aquaculture ==
These fish occasionally make their way into the pet trade. They require a minimum of 30 gallons, and being generally peaceful are suitable for community tanks, as long as no other fish have a similar body shape. However they do well in mated pairs. They should be kept at temperatures of 22–26 °C (72–78 °F), with a PH level of 8.1–8.4. They have a jumping ability which allows them to jump from tide pool to tide pool in the wild. This means that if they are to be housed in an aquarium a lid is necessary. The horseface blenny feeds primarily on algae, but also consumes zooplankton and other invertebrates. They possess two razor-sharp canine teeth, which has earned them the nickname of "devil fish" in some countries.

== Behavior ==
=== Reproduction ===
Redlip blennies reproduce year-round in the ten days before and four days after the full moon in each month. The male and female pair up in the first three hours of daylight, and the female moves to the male territory. The male has to prepare a nest for depositing eggs. In order to prepare a nest, the male makes a "small box-like" space in its territory and removes coral rubble and dead algae crusts from the space. One male redlip blenny usually has five nests, and the amount of time he spends at each nest is determined by how much the nest is favored by females. Usually the most favored nest has a larger inner surface area and volume than the less favored ones. When a female redlip blenny enters a male's nest, the female chooses whether or not to mate with the male. Larger males with larger nests have better chance of successful mating than smaller males with smaller nests. During spawning seasons, males reduce their feeding. The eggs are deposited in a single layer, and the male guards and cares for the eggs by blowing air onto them until they hatch as planktonic larvae. The egg batches in one nest may be at different developmental stages because the male redlip blenny is polygynous, mating with multiple females. In other words, the eggs have different mothers. Female redlip blennies tend to be polyandrous as well, meaning that there are multiple nests with one female's eggs.

The female mate choice primarily relies on a male's genetic quality or its non-genetic quality. A male is recognized to have good genes, if it has physical features that are suitable for survival. Usually, big body size indicates good genetic quality. Mating with a male of good genetic quality assures that the offspring will also have good genes and thus the physical features favorable for survival. This eventually will propagate the female's own genes. The non-genetic quality includes many examples, such as good parental care. Good parental care does not guarantee good genes for the offspring. However, good parental care can increase the survival rate of the offspring, thereby spreading the female's genes.

Female redlip blennies consider both the genetic and non-genetic quality of the male. First of all, they choose males largely based on their sizes (genetic quality). Larger males can better protect the female and the eggs against predators. Furthermore, larger male redlip blennies have larger antimicrobial organs at their anal-urogenital regions, which they use to prevent microbial infection in the eggs. Female redlip blennies also consider males' allopaternal care when choosing mates (non-genetic quality). Allopaternal care proves to the female that the male is capable of protecting the eggs from predators. Finally, a statistical study showed that female redlip blennies may prefer older males because the age of the male could reflect his survival ability and thus guarantee the offspring better fitness (chance of survival).

=== Parental care ===
Most parental care in fish is paternal care, where the male primarily gives care to the eggs, and redlip blennies are not exception. A male redlip blenny exhibits typical paternal care behaviors, such as protecting the eggs from predators and blowing fresh air to the eggs. The male also performs a non-typical paternal care: rubbing its anal-urogenital region over the nest's internal surface during spawning. The male redlip blenny has an organ at the anal-urogenital region that produces antimicrobial substances. This organ only exists in males due to sexual dimorphism. Therefore, by rubbing the anal-urogenital region over the nest's internal surface, the male protects its eggs from microbial infections, one of the most common causes for mortality in young fish. Larger males have larger organs at their anal-urogenital regions and thus can provide better antimicrobial protection for the eggs than smaller males. Consequently, female redlip blennies choose their mates based on their size.

Another atypical paternal care in redlip blennies is that the male indiscriminately cares for its own eggs and foreign eggs. When a male takes over the deserted nest, he will guard and care for the existing eggs in the nest, even though they are not his own eggs. This is called allopaternal care. Allopaternal care seems to be a huge disadvantage from an evolutionary perspective, since the male expends its resources to benefit genetically unrelated offspring. However, exhibiting allopaternal care actually attracts more females because the existence of safe eggs in the nest proves the male's capacity to protect the eggs against predators. The allopaternal behavior also shows to female that the male is a trustworthy mate who will remain after mating and provide the eggs with a good amount of parental investment, thereby increasing the fitness of the offspring.

=== Territoriality ===
Territorial behavior is usually performed to defend resources such as food, shelter, possible mates, spawning sites, and offspring. Redlip blennies live among rocks and coral reefs, and they are benthic. A redlip blenny generally exhibits aggressive territorial behaviors towards other benthic fishes, as they may take over its shelter and spawning site. Its territorial behavior is most severe towards conspecifics. This is because the conspecifics share exactly the same set of resources, leading to the most severe resource competition. A redlip blenny shows hostility of varying degrees not only to intruding conspecifics but also to barely intruding conspecifics. Due to this severe territoriality, the redlip blennies that have lost their territories experience a great difficulty in finding a new territory. Empty territories are often shared by neighboring fish without much competition. Despite severe territoriality, during the periods of lower adult blenny density, many blennies gather up and fight against old residents to take over their territories. After such aggressive competition, each old resident usually ends up with only half of its previous territory.

=== Larval swimming ===
Many fish have a swimbladder. By filling the swimbladder with gas, fish can float and swim in the water. However, redlip blennies never develop a swimbladder. The lack of a swimbladder does not affect adult redlip blennies, since they have already adjusted to the benthic life, as they matured. However, unlike the adults, redlip blenny larvae are not comfortable living at the sea bottom. Until they adjust to the bottom-dwelling life style, the larvae use a means of floating for survival: redlip blenny larvae have a huge storage of lipids in their liver, and this high lipid concentration provides buoyancy. The larvae keeps its high lipid concentration until maturation. Later, as the larvae go through metamorphosis, it burns down all the stored lipids to support the high metabolism of metamorphosis. After losing its lipids through metamorphosis, the now-grown-up redlip blenny does not restore lipids, which provides a permanent high density body to the adult fish.
