= Paraclinus beebei =

Conservation status
- Least Concern (IUCN 3.1)

Scientific classification
- Kingdom: Animalia
- Phylum: Chordata
- Class: Actinopterygii
- Order: Blenniiformes
- Family: Labrisomidae
- Genus: Paraclinus
- Species: P. beebei

Binomial name
- Paraclinus beebei C. Hubbs, 1952

Species of fish

Paraclinus beebei, the Pink blenny, is a species of labrisomid blenny endemic to the Gulf of California. The specific name honors the American zoologist William Beebe (1877-1962) of the New York Zoological Society.
