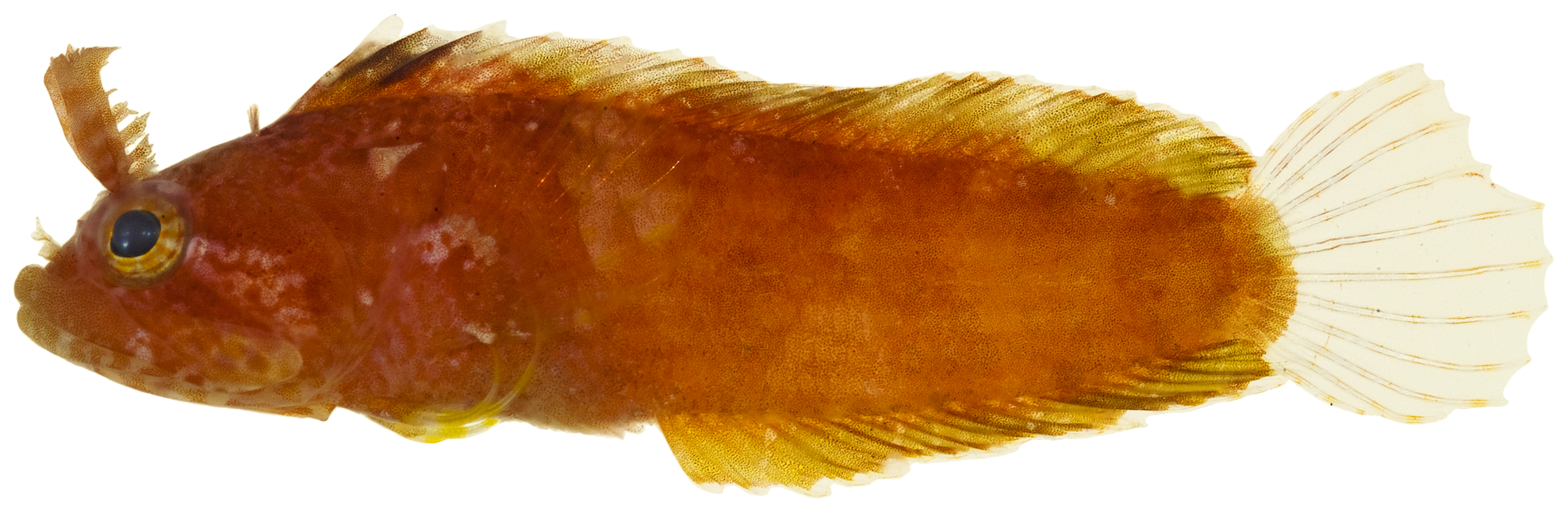
- Paraclinus grandicomis

Scientific classification
- Kingdom: Animalia
- Phylum: Chordata
- Class: Actinopterygii
- Order: Blenniiformes
- Family: Labrisomidae
- Genus: Paraclinus; Mocquard, 1888

Type species
- Acanthoclinus chaperi Mocquard, 1885

Synonyms
- Auchenopterus Günther, 1861 (pre-occupied); Cremnobates Günther, 1862; Acanthoclinus Mocquard, 1885 (pre-occupied); Corallicola D. S. Jordan & Evermann, 1898; Tekla Nichols, 1922; Cremnotekla Whitley, 1940

= Paraclinus =

Genus of fishes

Paraclinus is a genus of labrisomid blennies native to eastern Pacific Ocean and the western Atlantic Ocean.

== Species ==
There are currently 23 recognized species in this genus:

- Paraclinus altivelis (Lockington, 1881) (Topgallant blenny)
- Paraclinus arcanus R. Z. P. Guimarães & Bacellar, 2002
- Paraclinus barbatus V. G. Springer, 1955 (Goatee blenny)
- Paraclinus beebei C. Hubbs, 1952 (Pink blenny)
- Paraclinus cingulatus (Evermann & M. C. Marsh, 1899) (Coral blenny)
- Paraclinus ditrichus Rosenblatt & T. D. Parr, 1969 (Leastfoot blenny)
- Paraclinus fasciatus (Steindachner, 1876) (Banded blenny)
- Paraclinus fehlmanni V. G. Springer & Trist, 1969
- Paraclinus grandicomis (N. Rosén, 1911) (Horned blenny)
- Paraclinus infrons J. E. Böhlke, 1960 (Bald blenny)
- Paraclinus integripinnis (R. S. Eigenmann, 1880) (Reef finspot)
- Paraclinus magdalenae Rosenblatt & T. D. Parr, 1969 (Magdalena blenny)
- Paraclinus marmoratus (Steindachner, 1876) (Marbled blenny)
- Paraclinus mexicanus (C. H. Gilbert, 1904) (Mexican blenny)
- Paraclinus monophthalmus (Günther, 1861) (One-eyed blenny)
- Paraclinus naeorhegmis J. E. Böhlke, 1960 (Surf blenny)
- Paraclinus nigripinnis (Steindachner, 1867) (Blackfin blenny)
- Paraclinus rubicundus (Starks, 1913)
- Paraclinus sini C. Hubbs, 1952 (Flapscale blenny)
- Paraclinus spectator R. Z. P. Guimarães & Bacellar, 2002
- Paraclinus stephensi Rosenblatt & T. D. Parr, 1969 (Professor blenny)
- Paraclinus tanygnathus Rosenblatt & T. D. Parr, 1969 (Longjaw blenny)
- Paraclinus walkeri C. Hubbs, 1952 (San Quintin blenny)
