= Paraclinus walkeri =

Conservation status
- Critically Endangered (IUCN 3.1)

Scientific classification
- Kingdom: Animalia
- Phylum: Chordata
- Class: Actinopterygii
- Order: Blenniiformes
- Family: Labrisomidae
- Genus: Paraclinus
- Species: P. walkeri

Binomial name
- Paraclinus walkeri C. Hubbs, 1952

Species of fish

Paraclinus walkeri, the San Quintin blenny, is a species of labrisomid blenny native to the coasts of Baja California Sur, Mexico. The specific name honours the fisheries biologist Boyd W. Walker (1917-2001) of the University of California, Los Angeles who placed his specimens at the disposal of Clark Hubbs.
