= Eric Pianka =

American zoologist (1939–2022)

Eric R. Pianka
- Born: Eric Rodger Pianka; January 23, 1939; Siskiyou County, California, U.S.
- Died: September 12, 2022 (aged 83); Texas Hill Country, U.S.
- Education: Carleton College; University of Washington
- Awards: Guggenheim Fellowship, 1978; AAAS Fellow, 1981; American Academy of Arts and Sciences 2014; Eminent Ecologist, Ecological Society of America, 2015
- Scientific career
- Fields: Herpetology
- Workplaces: University of Texas at Austin
- Website: U Texas at Austin writings

Eric Rodger Pianka (January 23, 1939 – September 12, 2022) was an American herpetologist and evolutionary ecologist.

== Early life ==
Pianka was born in Siskiyou County in 1939. At age 13, he was seriously injured in a bazooka blast in the front yard of his childhood home in Yreka, California. His left leg became gangrenous, and he lost 10 cm of his tibia, as well as the terminal digit of the middle finger on his right hand. Pianka's childhood injury left him with a short and partially paralyzed leg. In later life, his short leg resulted in spinal scoliosis and cervical spondylosis.

Pianka graduated from Carleton College (B.A., 1960) and earned his Ph.D. from the University of Washington in 1965. He went on to do postdoctoral work with ecologist Robert H. MacArthur at Princeton University. This period, during which he worked closely with the temporarily studentless MacArthur, had a major influence on Pianka's thinking. In 1966, with MacArthur, Pianka coauthored the paper, "On optimal use of a patchy environment". Pianka frequently mentioned MacArthur in his lectures and kept a webpage for his deceased mentor and colleague. In some ways, Pianka's own research program expands upon and continues the work that he and MacArthur began.

== Career ==
Since 1968, Pianka had been on the faculty of the University of Texas at Austin. His research centered on empirical and theoretical components of natural history, systematics, community and landscape ecology.

Pianka had performed extensive ecological investigations on vertebrate communities in three desert systems on three continents: the Great Basin, Mojave, and Sonora Deserts in North America; the Kalahari in Africa; and the Great Victoria Desert in Western Australia. His monographic treatment of this work is a landmark ecological synthesis (Pianka, 1986).

Pianka's latest work focused on lizard communities in Australia. His research projects included study of the phylogeny and ecology of a number of groups of Australian lizards and an extensive study of the unique biotic landscape produced by Australian brush fires. His favorite lizard was a small Australian goanna, Varanus eremius. In his research, Pianka combined traditional field biological methods with recent technological innovations in statistical analysis, phylogenetic reconstruction, and imaging of the Earth's surface in attempts to answer major questions about evolution and ecology.

Pianka had trained other scientists and twelve of his former graduate students are professors at major universities, including Kirk Winemiller, a professor at Texas A&M University, and Raymond Huey, a professor at the University of Washington. Additionally, he taught a range of popular undergraduate courses; he received an award for excellence in teaching from UT Austin in 1999.

== Texas Academy of Science speech ==
Pianka's acceptance speech for the 2006 Distinguished Texas Scientist Award from the Texas Academy of Science resulted in a controversy in the popular press when Forrest Mims, vice-chair of the Academy's section on environmental science, claimed that Pianka had "enthusiastically advocated the elimination of 90 percent of Earth's population by airborne Ebola." Mims claimed that Pianka said the Earth would not survive without drastic measures. Mims' affiliate at the Discovery Institute, William Dembski, then informed the Department of Homeland Security that Pianka's speech may have been intended to foment bioterrorism. This resulted in the Federal Bureau of Investigation interviewing Pianka in Austin.

Pianka has stated that Mims took his statements out of context and that he was simply describing what would happen from biological principles alone if present human population trends continue, and that he was not in any way advocating for it to happen. The Texas Academy, which hosted the speech, released a statement asserting that "Many of Dr. Pianka's statements have been severely misconstrued and sensationalized." However, Kenneth Summy, an Academy member who observed the speech, wrote a letter of support for Mims' account, saying "Dr. Pianka chose to deliver an inflammatory message in his keynote address, so he should not be surprised to be the recipient of a lot of criticism from TAS membership. Forrest Mims did not misrepresent anything regarding the presentation."

Pianka appeared on NBC-affiliate KXAN Austin and on two cable talk-shows and posted a statement on his University of Texas website that said in part:

I have two grandchildren and I want them to inherit a stable Earth. But I fear for them. Humans have overpopulated the Earth and in the process have created an ideal nutritional substrate on which bacteria and viruses (microbes) will grow and prosper. We are behaving like bacteria growing on an agar plate, flourishing until natural limits are reached or until another microbe colonizes and takes over, using them as their resource. In addition to our extremely high population density, we are social and mobile, exactly the conditions that favor growth and spread of pathogenic (disease-causing) microbes. I believe it is only a matter of time until microbes once again assert control over our population, since we are unwilling to control it ourselves. This idea has been espoused by ecologists for at least four decades and is nothing new. People just don't want to hear it. I do not bear any ill will toward people. However, I am convinced that the world, including all humanity, WOULD clearly be much better off without so many of us. Simply stopping the destruction of rainforests would help mediate some current planetary ills, including the release of previously unknown pathogens. The ancient Chinese curse "may you live in interesting times" comes to mind – we are living in one of the most interesting times humans have ever experienced. For example, consider the manifold effects of global warming. We need to make a transition to a sustainable world. If we don't, nature is going to do it for us in ways of her own choosing. By definition, these ways will not be ours and they won't be much fun. Think about that.

As a consequence of the controversy, Pianka and members of the Texas Academy of Science received death threats. According to Pianka, his daughters were worried about his and their safety, and his life had been "turned upside-down by 'right-wing fools'."

== Awards and accolades ==
Pianka was a 1978 Guggenheim Fellow, a 1981 American Association for the Advancement of Science Fellow, and a 1990 Fulbright Senior Research Scholar. He had received numerous awards, and at least three species, an Australian lizard (Ctenotus piankai) and two lizard parasites, are named after him. A symposium in his honor was held by the Herpetologist's League in 2004. The American Society of Ichthyologists and Herpetologists passed a resolution on the word "Piankafication" to describe Pianka's influence on evolutionary biology and ecology at their business meeting in 2004. In this resolution, they noted that he has had "vast and immeasurable influence on several fields of evolutionary ecology" and that his "years in the field have set the standard for both natural history and for ecological studies, resulting in publications that have lain the foundation for research programs..."

Pianka received the 2006 Distinguished Texas Scientist Award from the Texas Academy of Science. He and his research were featured in a wildlife documentary on monitor lizards — "Lizard Kings" — which premiered nationally on the PBS NOVA series in October 2009.

In 2015, Pianka was awarded the Auffenberg Medal in recognition of his extensive research on monitor lizards by the Monitor Lizard Specialist Group. In the same year, he received the highest award of the Ecological Society of America, the Eminent Ecologist Award, having been elected a Fellow of the Ecological Society of America in 2014.

== Works ==
Pianka had produced about 200 scientific papers, as well as the textbook, Evolutionary Ecology, which has gone through seven editions and has been translated into five languages. In 2003, he also published Lizards: Windows to the Evolution of Diversity, coauthored with longtime collaborator Laurie Vitt, won the Grand Prize at the Robert W. Hamilton Faculty Author Award at The University of Texas at Austin as well as the Oklahoma Book Award from the Oklahoma Center for the Book.

== Books ==
- Evolutionary Ecology (1983), ISBN 0-06-045216-1
- Pianka ER (1994). The Lizard Man Speaks. University of Texas Press. ISBN 0-292-76552-5.
- Pianka ER (1986). Ecology and Natural History of Desert Lizards. Princeton University Press. ISBN 0-691-08148-4.
- Pianka, Eric and Dennis King (2004), Varanoid Lizards of the World, Indiana University Press.
- Pianka, Eric and Laurie Vitt (2003), Lizards: Windows to the Evolution of Diversity, University of California Press.
- Our One and Only Spaceship: Denial, Delusion, and the Population Crisis (2019) (with Laurie Vitt). ISBN 9781733030533
