= Paraclinus sini =

Conservation status
- Least Concern (IUCN 3.1)

Scientific classification
- Kingdom: Animalia
- Phylum: Chordata
- Class: Actinopterygii
- Order: Blenniiformes
- Family: Labrisomidae
- Genus: Paraclinus
- Species: P. sini

Binomial name
- Paraclinus sini C. Hubbs, 1952

Synonyms
- Paraclinus altivelis sini C. Hubbs, 1952

Species of fish

Paraclinus sini, the Flapscale blenny, is a species of labrisomid blenny native to the Pacific coast of Mexico including the Gulf of California. This species can reach a length of 6 centimetres (2.4 in) TL.
