= Paraclinus arcanus =

Conservation status
- Least Concern (IUCN 3.1)

Scientific classification
- Kingdom: Animalia
- Phylum: Chordata
- Class: Actinopterygii
- Order: Blenniiformes
- Family: Labrisomidae
- Genus: Paraclinus
- Species: P. arcanus

Binomial name
- Paraclinus arcanus R. Z. P. Guimarães & Bacellar, 2002

Species of fish

Paraclinus arcanus is a species of labrisomid blenny native to the Atlantic coast of Brazil. It is an inhabitant of reefs at depths of from near the surface to 3 metres (9.8 ft). This species can reach a length of 3.2 centimetres (1.3 in) SL.
