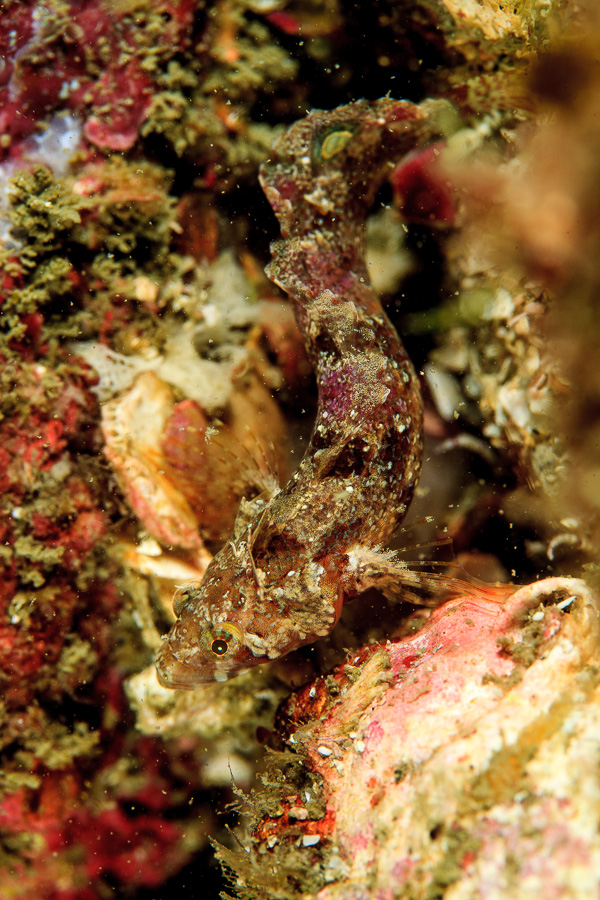

Conservation status
- Least Concern (IUCN 3.1)

Scientific classification
- Kingdom: Animalia
- Phylum: Chordata
- Class: Actinopterygii
- Order: Blenniiformes
- Family: Labrisomidae
- Genus: Paraclinus
- Species: P. spectator

Binomial name
- Paraclinus spectator R. Z. P. Guimarães & Bacellar, 2002

= Paraclinus spectator =

Species of fish

Paraclinus spectator is a species of labrisomid blenny native to the Atlantic coast of Brazil where it can be found on rocky reefs at depths of from 1 to 7 metres (3.3 to 23.0 ft). This species can reach a length of 5.2 centimetres (2.0 in) SL.
