= Paraclinus infrons =

Conservation status
- Least Concern (IUCN 3.1)

Scientific classification
- Kingdom: Animalia
- Phylum: Chordata
- Class: Actinopterygii
- Order: Blenniiformes
- Family: Labrisomidae
- Genus: Paraclinus
- Species: P. infrons

Binomial name
- Paraclinus infrons J. E. Böhlke, 1960

Species of fish

Paraclinus infrons, the Bald blenny, is a species of labrisomid blenny native to reefs of the Atlantic Ocean and the Caribbean Sea from Florida and the Bahamas over to Belize. It is found at depths of from 12 to 45 metres (39 to 148 ft). This species can reach a length of 3 centimetres (1.2 in).
