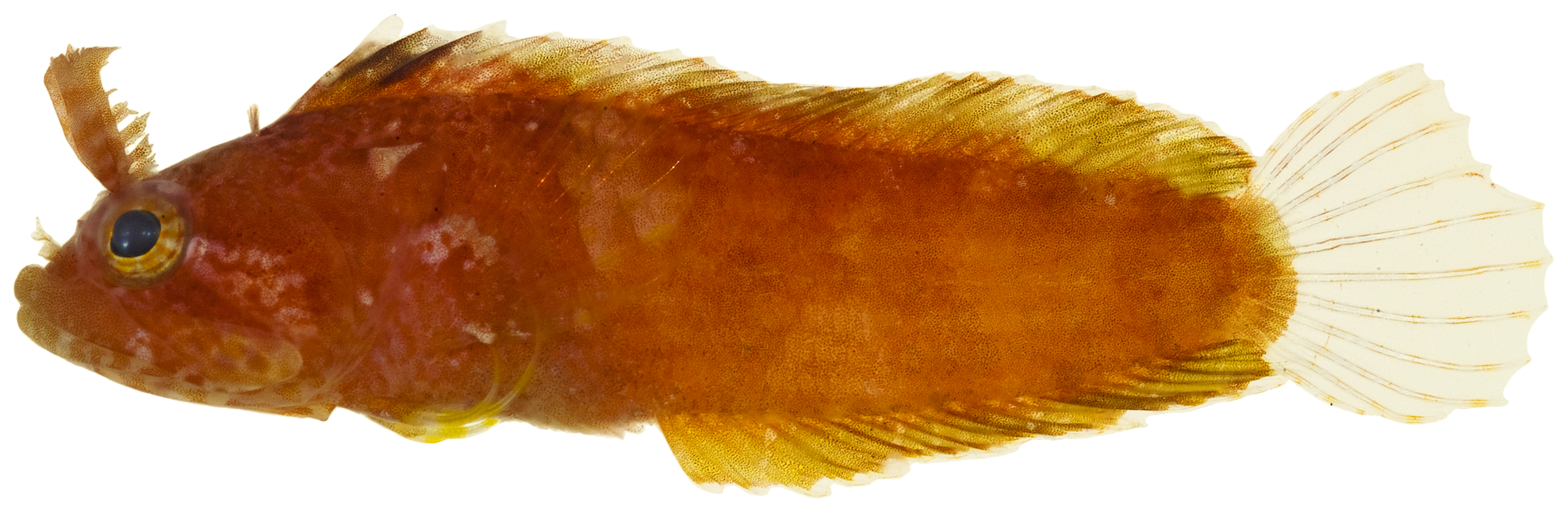

Conservation status
- Least Concern (IUCN 3.1)

Scientific classification
- Kingdom: Animalia
- Phylum: Chordata
- Class: Actinopterygii
- Division: Teleostei
- Order: Blenniiformes
- Family: Labrisomidae
- Genus: Paraclinus
- Species: P. grandicomis

Binomial name
- Paraclinus grandicomis (N. Rosén, 1911)

Synonyms
- Auchenopterus grandicomis N. Rosén, 1911

= Paraclinus grandicomis =

Species of fish

Paraclinus grandicomis, the horned blenny, is a perciform marine species of labrisomid blenny native to reefs of the Atlantic Ocean and the Caribbean Sea. It is a benthic fish, so it cruises along above the sandy or rocky seabed and forages for crustaceans.

== Habitat ==
The horned blenny can be commonly found in shallow waters, between 0 and 3 meters, inhabiting sponges, corals, and sea anemones. Its habitat choice relies on the abundance of food and shelter from predators, which is why it can be observed occupying seabed clams, oysters, shells, and submerged vegetation such as mangroves and seagrass.

== Geographic distribution ==
The Paraclinus grandicomis inhabits tropical waters that range from southern Florida through the Lesser Antilles. This species dwells in tropical (10–23N) and subtropical (23–35N) climate zones.

== Physical description ==
The horned blenny is a brown-colored fish covered in pale mottling all over its body and head. Dorsal, anal, and tail fins have dark brown bases and pale or clear edges. This species is characterized by having elongated snouts that are blunt at the end and a singular large horn called the maxillary bone branching from their heads; additionally, thin strands of cirrus cover the nostrils and line its stalk from eyes to dorsal fin. The blenny's spine is composed of 34–35 small vertebrae, giving it a maximum length of only four centimeters.

== Ecology ==
The horned blenny, as well as some other Caribbean reef fishes, have developed behavioral and physiological adaptations that make them immune to stings of sea anemones. The acclimation process can take several minutes to several hours of being stung repeatedly by an anemone tentacle to build resistance.

== Feeding ==
Horned blennies are carnivorous fish that do not only feast on seabed worms but also benthic crustacea; both of these food sources can be found in large quantities at the sea floor of shallow waters where most blennies live.

== Sexual dimorphism ==
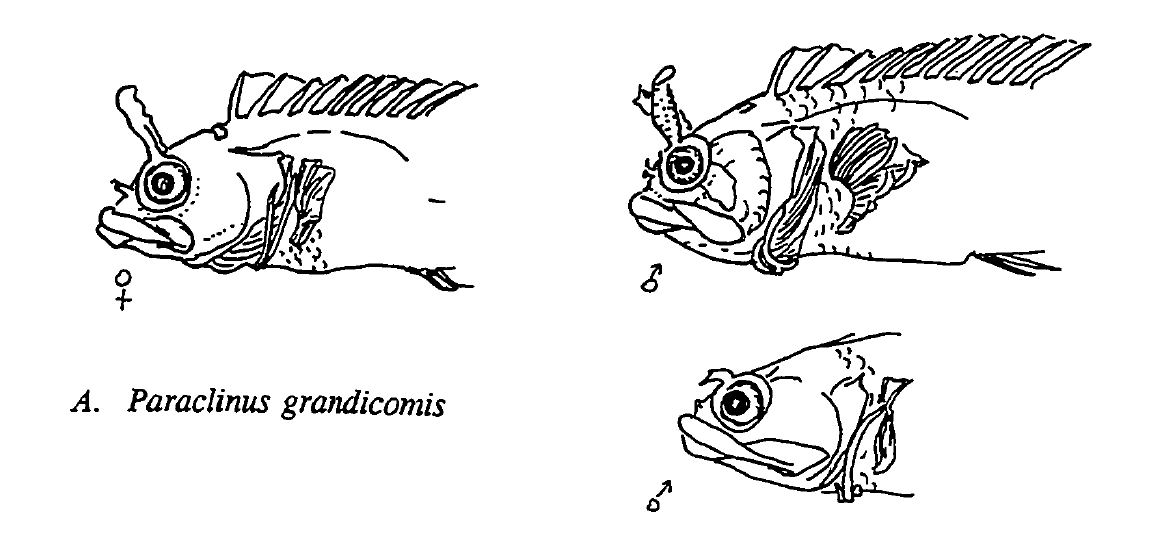
Illustration of P. grandicomis sexual dimorphism.

Typically, the length of the protruding maxillary bone of blennies is longer in males than in females of the same species; however, proportional differences are maintained among species. The horned blenny, both male and female, have their horns located on the anterior half of the skull orbit.
