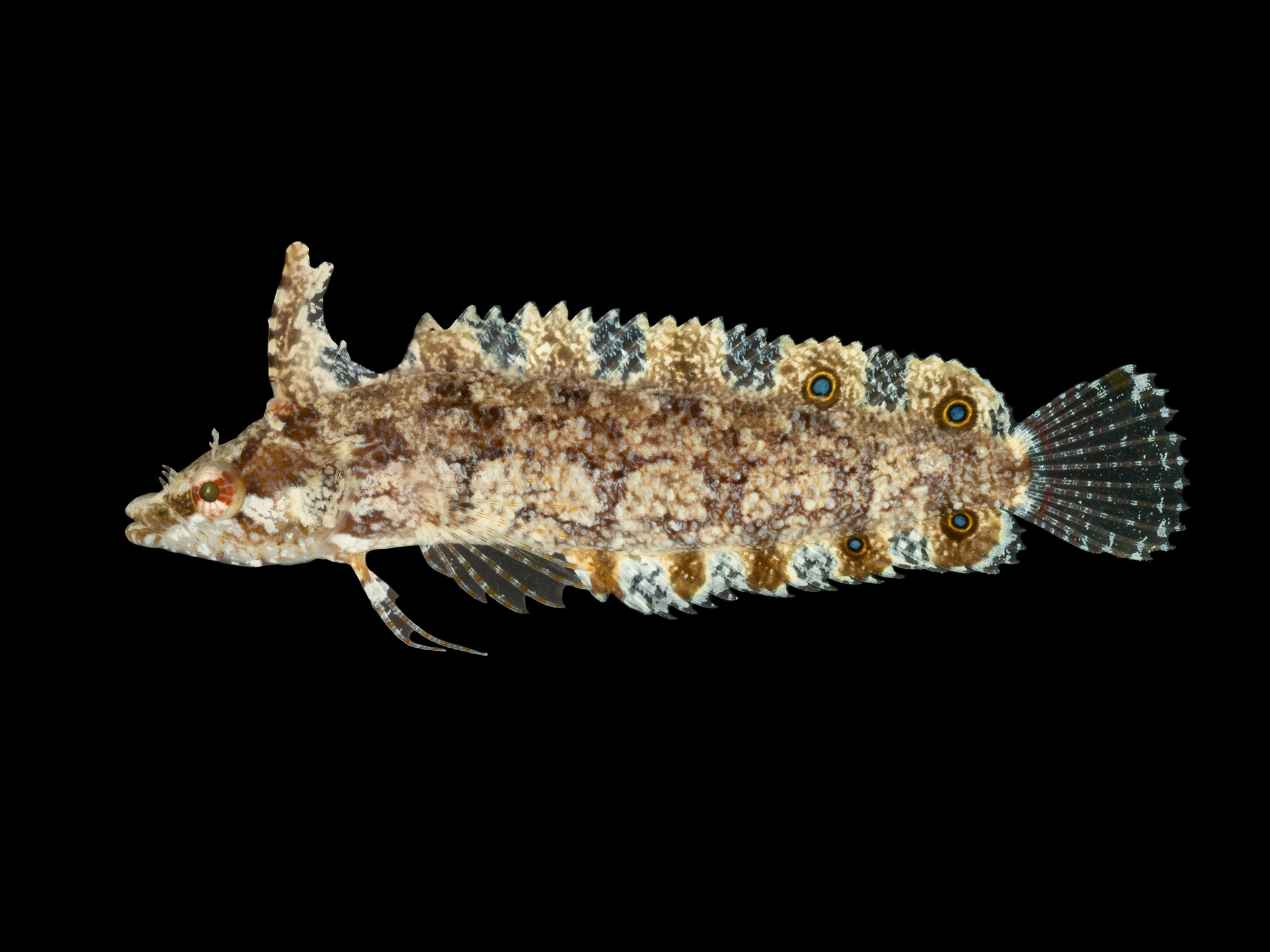

Conservation status
- Least Concern (IUCN 3.1)

Scientific classification
- Kingdom: Animalia
- Phylum: Chordata
- Class: Actinopterygii
- Order: Blenniiformes
- Family: Labrisomidae
- Genus: Paraclinus
- Species: P. marmoratus

Binomial name
- Paraclinus marmoratus (Steindachner, 1876)

Synonyms
- Cremnobates marmoratus Steindachner, 1876

= Paraclinus marmoratus =

Species of fish

Paraclinus marmoratus, the Marbled blenny, is a species of labrisomid blenny native to the western Atlantic Ocean including the Gulf of Mexico and the Caribbean Sea from southern Florida to Venezuela. This species can be found in shallow waters down to a depth of about 6 metres (20 ft) on coral reefs and in sea grass beds. It seems to show a particular association with the sponge Verongia fistularis. This species can reach a length of 10 centimetres (3.9 in) TL. It can also be found in the aquarium trade.
