= Paraclinus monophthalmus =

Conservation status
- Least Concern (IUCN 3.1)

Scientific classification
- Kingdom: Animalia
- Phylum: Chordata
- Class: Actinopterygii
- Order: Blenniiformes
- Family: Labrisomidae
- Genus: Paraclinus
- Species: P. monophthalmus

Binomial name
- Paraclinus monophthalmus (Günther, 1861)

Synonyms
- Auchenopterus monophthalmus Günther, 1861

Species of fish

Paraclinus monophthalmus, known commonly as the One-eyed blenny, is a species of labrisomid blenny native to the Pacific coast of Central America where they occur in shallow waters with plentiful weed growth from Costa Rica to Panama. This species can reach a length of 8.5 centimetres (3.3 in) TL.
