= Paraclinus fehlmanni =

Conservation status
- Vulnerable (IUCN 3.1)

Scientific classification
- Kingdom: Animalia
- Phylum: Chordata
- Class: Actinopterygii
- Division: Teleostei
- Order: Blenniiformes
- Family: Labrisomidae
- Genus: Paraclinus
- Species: P. fehlmanni

Binomial name
- Paraclinus fehlmanni V. G. Springer & Trist, 1969

Species of fish

Paraclinus fehlmanni is a species of labrisomid blenny only known from the Pacific coast of Ecuador where it is found in tide pools down to depths of 2 metres (6.6 ft). Males of this species can reach a length of 4 centimetres (1.6 in) SL while females can grow to 8.4 centimetres (3.3 in). The specific name honours the ichthyologist and herpetologist Herman Adair Fehlmann (1917-2005) who worked at the Smithsonian Oceanographic Sorting Center and who, among collecting many other specimens, collected the type of this species.
