= Paraclinus magdalenae =

Conservation status
- Endangered (IUCN 3.1)

Scientific classification
- Kingdom: Animalia
- Phylum: Chordata
- Class: Actinopterygii
- Order: Blenniiformes
- Family: Labrisomidae
- Genus: Paraclinus
- Species: P. magdalenae

Binomial name
- Paraclinus magdalenae Rosenblatt & T. D. Parr, 1969

Species of fish

Paraclinus magdalenae, the Magdalena blenny, is a species of labrisomid blenny only known from around Isla Margarita in Magdalena Bay on the coast of Baja California Sur, where it is found at depths of around 18 to 21 metres (59 to 69 ft).
