= Paraclinus stephensi =

Conservation status
- Least Concern (IUCN 3.1)

Scientific classification
- Kingdom: Animalia
- Phylum: Chordata
- Class: Actinopterygii
- Order: Blenniiformes
- Family: Labrisomidae
- Genus: Paraclinus
- Species: P. stephensi

Binomial name
- Paraclinus stephensi Rosenblatt & T. D. Parr, 1969

Species of fish

Paraclinus stephensi, the Professor blenny, is a species of labrisomid blenny native to the Pacific coast of Mexico where it can be found at depths of from near the surface to 14 metres (46 ft). The specific name honours the American biologist John S. Stephens Jr., who has extensively studied the Blenniiformes.
