= Paraclinus barbatus =

Conservation status
- Least Concern (IUCN 3.1)

Scientific classification
- Kingdom: Animalia
- Phylum: Chordata
- Class: Actinopterygii
- Order: Blenniiformes
- Family: Labrisomidae
- Genus: Paraclinus
- Species: P. barbatus

Binomial name
- Paraclinus barbatus V. G. Springer, 1955

Species of fish

Paraclinus barbatus, the Goatee blenny, is a species of labrisomid blenny native to reefs of the western Atlantic Ocean and the Caribbean Sea. It can reach a length of 3.4 centimetres (1.3 in) TL.
