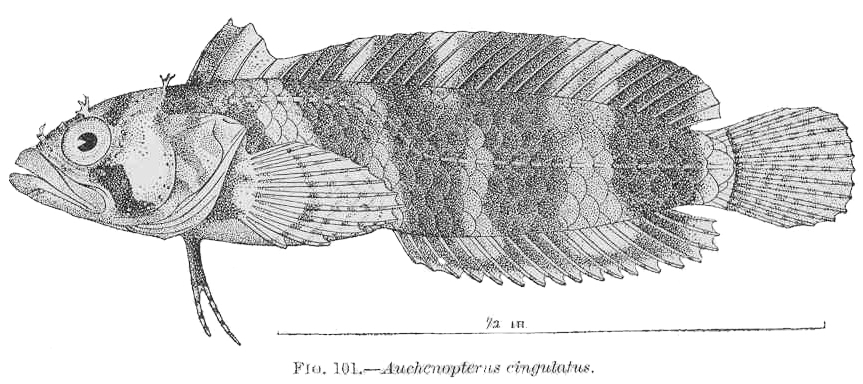

Conservation status
- Least Concern (IUCN 3.1)

Scientific classification
- Kingdom: Animalia
- Phylum: Chordata
- Class: Actinopterygii
- Order: Blenniiformes
- Family: Labrisomidae
- Genus: Paraclinus
- Species: P. cingulatus

Binomial name
- Paraclinus cingulatus (Evermann & M. C. Marsh, 1899)

Synonyms
- Auchenopterus cingulatus Evermann & M. C. Marsh, 1899

= Paraclinus cingulatus =

Species of fish

Paraclinus cingulatus, the coral blenny, is a species of labrisomid blenny native to the Atlantic Ocean and the Caribbean Sea from southern Florida to Honduras and through the Greater Antilles. It is an inhabitant of coral reefs and lives amongst rubble and can also be found in tide pools. This species can reach a length of 3 centimetres (1.2 in) TL.
