= Paraclinus tanygnathus =

Conservation status
- Least Concern (IUCN 3.1)

Scientific classification
- Kingdom: Animalia
- Phylum: Chordata
- Class: Actinopterygii
- Order: Blenniiformes
- Family: Labrisomidae
- Genus: Paraclinus
- Species: P. tanygnathus

Binomial name
- Paraclinus tanygnathus Rosenblatt & T. D. Parr, 1969

Species of fish

Paraclinus tanygnathus, the Longjaw blenny, is a species of labrisomid blenny native to the Pacific coast of Mexico including the Gulf of California where it can be found at depths of from very shallow waters to about 14 metres (46 ft).
