= Paraclinus altivelis =

Conservation status
- Data Deficient (IUCN 3.1)

Scientific classification
- Kingdom: Animalia
- Phylum: Chordata
- Class: Actinopterygii
- Order: Blenniiformes
- Family: Labrisomidae
- Genus: Paraclinus
- Species: P. altivelis

Binomial name
- Paraclinus altivelis (Lockington, 1881)

Synonyms
- Cremnobates altivelis Lockington, 1881

Species of fish

Paraclinus altivelis, the topgallant blenny, is a species of labrisomid blenny endemic to the Gulf of California where it can be found in the vicinity of reefs at depths of from 7.6 to 30 metres (25 to 98 ft).
