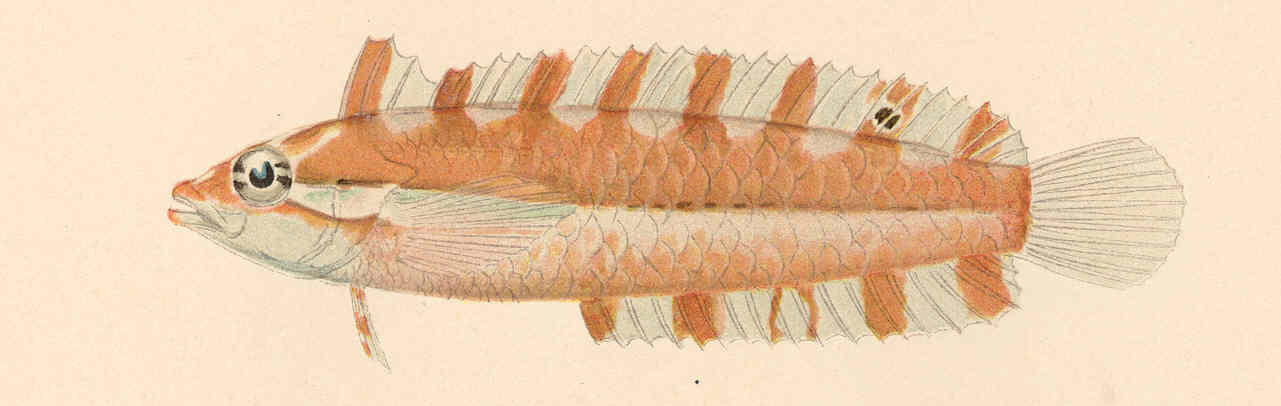

Conservation status
- Least Concern (IUCN 3.1)

Scientific classification
- Kingdom: Animalia
- Phylum: Chordata
- Class: Actinopterygii
- Order: Blenniiformes
- Family: Labrisomidae
- Genus: Paraclinus
- Species: P. nigripinnis

Binomial name
- Paraclinus nigripinnis (Steindachner, 1867)

Synonyms
- Clinus nigripinnis Steindachner, 1867; Auchenopterus fajardo Evermann & M.C. Marsh, 1899

= Paraclinus nigripinnis =

Species of fish

Paraclinus nigripinnis, the Blackfin blenny, is a species of labrisomid blenny native to the western Atlantic Ocean and the Caribbean Sea from southern Florida to Brazil. It inhabits coral reefs, areas of eroded limestone, tide pools, and rocky areas with algal growth down to depths of around 10 metres (33 ft). This species can reach a length of 6.5 centimetres (2.6 in) TL. It can also be found in the aquarium trade.
