= Paraclinus rubicundus =

Conservation status
- Least Concern (IUCN 3.1)

Scientific classification
- Kingdom: Animalia
- Phylum: Chordata
- Class: Actinopterygii
- Order: Blenniiformes
- Family: Labrisomidae
- Genus: Paraclinus
- Species: P. rubicundus

Binomial name
- Paraclinus rubicundus (Starks, 1913)

Synonyms
- Auchenopterus rubicundus Starks, 1913

Species of fish

Paraclinus rubicundus is a species of labrisomid blennie native to the Atlantic coast of Brazil where it inhabits algae-covered reefs at depths of from near the surface to 25 metres (82 ft). This species can reach a length of 4.7 centimetres (1.9 in) SL.
