= Paraclinus naeorhegmis =

Conservation status
- Least Concern (IUCN 3.1)

Scientific classification
- Kingdom: Animalia
- Phylum: Chordata
- Class: Actinopterygii
- Order: Blenniiformes
- Family: Labrisomidae
- Genus: Paraclinus
- Species: P. naeorhegmis

Binomial name
- Paraclinus naeorhegmis J. E. Böhlke, 1960

Species of fish

Paraclinus naeorhegmis, the Surf blenny, is a species of labrisomid blenny endemic to the Bahamas where it occurs in eroded limestone shorelines. This species can reach a length of 2.7 centimetres (1.1 in) TL.
