= Paraclinus ditrichus =

Conservation status
- Data Deficient (IUCN 3.1)

Scientific classification
- Kingdom: Animalia
- Phylum: Chordata
- Class: Actinopterygii
- Order: Blenniiformes
- Family: Labrisomidae
- Genus: Paraclinus
- Species: P. ditrichus

Binomial name
- Paraclinus ditrichus Rosenblatt & T. D. Parr, 1969

Species of fish

Paraclinus ditrichus, the Leastfoot blenny, is a species of labrisomid blenny native to the Pacific coast of Mexico at depths of from near the surface to 6 metres (20 ft).
