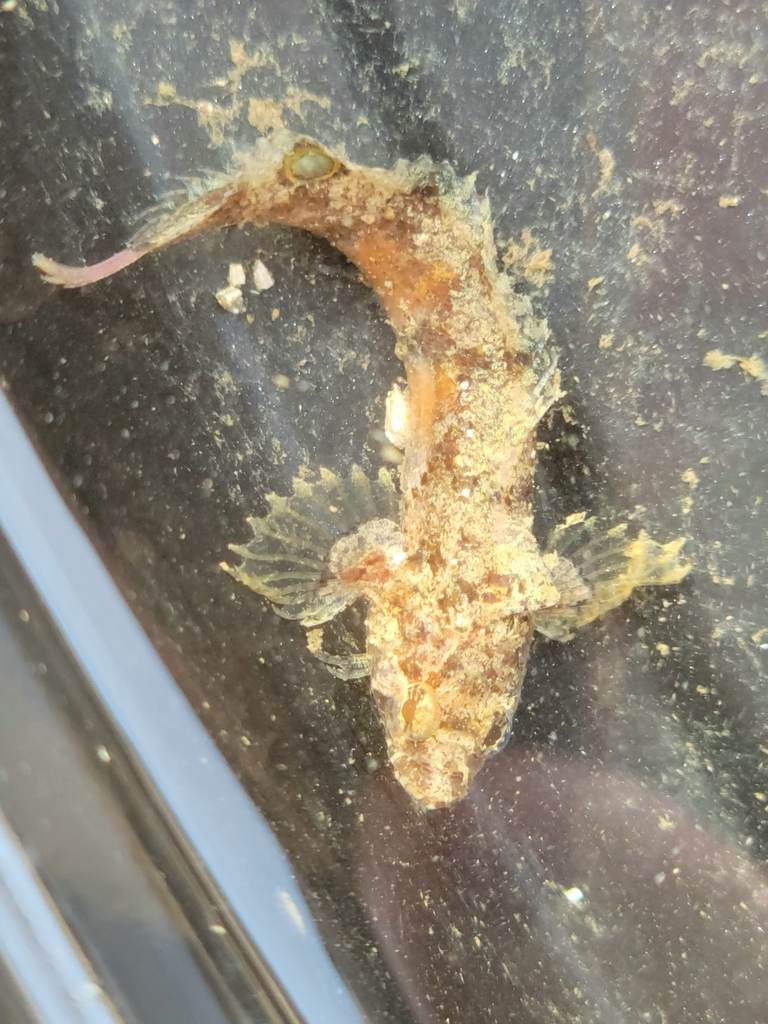

Conservation status
- Least Concern (IUCN 3.1)

Scientific classification
- Kingdom: Animalia
- Phylum: Chordata
- Class: Actinopterygii
- Order: Blenniiformes
- Family: Labrisomidae
- Genus: Paraclinus
- Species: P. integripinnis

Binomial name
- Paraclinus integripinnis (R. S. Eigenmann, 1880)

Synonyms
- Cremnobates integripinnis R. Smith, 1880

= Paraclinus integripinnis =

Species of fish

Paraclinus integripinnis, the reef finspot, is a species of labrisomid blenny native to the Pacific coast of North America from southern California to Baja California. This species inhabits rocky areas and tide pools down to depths of 15 metres (49 ft). It can reach a length of 6.4 centimetres (2.5 in) TL.
