= Paraclinus mexicanus =

Conservation status
- Least Concern (IUCN 3.1)

Scientific classification
- Kingdom: Animalia
- Phylum: Chordata
- Class: Actinopterygii
- Order: Blenniiformes
- Family: Labrisomidae
- Genus: Paraclinus
- Species: P. mexicanus

Binomial name
- Paraclinus mexicanus (C. H. Gilbert, 1904)

Synonyms
- Auchenopterus mexicanus C. H. Gilbert, 1904

Species of fish

Paraclinus mexicanus, the Mexican blenny, is a species of labrisomid blenny native to reefs of the Pacific coast of the Americas from Baja California, Mexico to Ecuador. This species can reach a length of 4 centimetres (1.6 in) TL. It can also be found in the aquarium trade.

== Further references ==
Rosenblatt, Richard; Parr, Terence (6 March 1969). "The Pacific Species of the Clinid Fish Genus Paraclinus". American Society of Ichthyologists and Herpetologists. 1969 (1): 1–20.
