= Paraclinus fasciatus =

Conservation status
- Least Concern (IUCN 3.1)

Scientific classification
- Kingdom: Animalia
- Phylum: Chordata
- Class: Actinopterygii
- Order: Blenniiformes
- Family: Labrisomidae
- Genus: Paraclinus
- Species: P. fasciatus

Binomial name
- Paraclinus fasciatus (Steindachner, 1876)

Synonyms
- Cremnobates fasciatus Steindachner, 1876

Species of fish

Paraclinus fasciatus, the banded blenny, is a species of labrisomid blenny native to the Atlantic Ocean including the Gulf of Mexico and the Caribbean Sea from southern Florida to Venezuela. The banded blenny is a marine organism, meaning it lives in an aquatic environment. This species lives in the vicinity of coral reefs preferring sea grass beds in shallow waters down to 2 metres (6.6 ft). Although they are typically located in shallow waters, their colors camouflage them exceptionally well, leading to them rarely being seen or recognized. They have also been found within floating algae.

They are part of the family perciform teleost fishes within the sub order Blenniodei. The suborder blenniodei currently comprises 6 families, 151 genera, and 883 species. The perciform fish lineage is distinguished by its small body size, as well as their coastal and benthic habitats. The banded blenny has a typical lifespan of one year.

== Taxonomic characteristics ==
Paraclinus fasciatus is a species within the class Osteichthyes, or bony fishes. This class represents the largest class of vertebrates, with more than 31,000 species. One of the distinguishing characteristics of this class is that the organisms have a skeleton at least partially made of bone. Another characteristic being, this class typically has cycloid or ctenoid scales in comparison to pointed placoid scales. These scales are distinguished by their bony makeup and the protective layer of mucous covering them. The operculum is another defining characteristic of this class, it is a gill cover which, as its name implies, protects the gills with a flap. Bony fishes typically have fin rays rather than a fleshy makeup that you see in cartilaginous fishes. Often, you will also see a swim bladder within bony fishes which acts as a floatation tool, allowing the fish to adjust its depth in the water.

== Morphology ==
Banded blennies are small and slender. Their standard length is 15 mm. The color of their body ranges from different shades of brown and has thick black bar-like stripes. They have three well defined dorsal-fin spines. They have fin-hook characteristics which are significant of the adaptations these blennies have made to their bottom-dwelling lifestyle. Adaptations of this pectoral fin has drawn great attention to the blennies from researchers. The lower part of the pectoral fin has a fibrous cord as well as deeply incised fin-web between neighboring rays. Banded blennies are also referred to as "combtooth blennies" because they have ctenoid scales. These are overlapping fish scales. Ctenoid scales are similar to cycloid scales which are large and thin with a circular shape. The main difference here is that ctenoid scales have spines or comb-like spikes at their free edges.

== Reproduction ==
Blenniids are typically sexually dimorphic. The males are larger than the females and exhibit secondary sex characteristics (SSC). The SSC are especially seen during breeding seasons, which is typically early summer resulting in a large increase in population in late Summer/early Fall. The male SSC include, an enlarged dorsal fin, glands on the anal spine, and color marks on the head or body. Banded blennys are oviparous, meaning they release eggs as means of reproduction.

There are breeding patterns observed among Blenniids, this includes males defending the breeding territory in which females come to spawn in a small hole or cavity. The territory is typically a sheltered area. The males provide the exclusive parental care and guard the eggs until they have hatched.

== Habitat ==
The banded blennies tend to be found in tropical/subtropical locations. Within these locations, they are found in shallow waters, in coral, rock, and sandy bottoms. These blennies also seem to favor sea grass beds. They are classified as benthic, coastal fishes, although some have been found at depths of 30m. There have also been studies conducted that correlate the population density of banded blennies to the amount of unattached red algae, also known as drift algae. The study conducted by Stoner shows that the more drift algae there is, the more blennies there also are. This floating red algae is able to provide shelter, as well as food for the fish. These fish are also known to be exceptionally tolerant of physical and chemical conditions within the shallow waters along coastal Florida.

== Feeding ==
Banded blennies are carnivores with highly specialized diets. Meaning, they feed on very specific species. They have teeth in their jaws to help capture prey as do most bony-fishes. Blennies tend to solely prey on amphipods when they are juveniles or below 15 mm in size. If they are above 15 mm in size their diet expands to not only amphipods, but also shrimp, crab, and isopods. Although this species has a highly specialized diet, it also seems to vary with seasonal changes, leading to differences in prey species abundance. A study conducted in Apalachee Bay, Florida, found that the most important prey species were Cymadusa compta and Hippolyte zostericola.
