= Texas Journal of Science =

- Discipline: Science, Science Education
- Language: English

Publication details
- Publisher: Texas Academy of Science (United States)
- Impact factor: 0.113 (2010)

Standard abbreviations
- ISO 4: Tex. J. Sci.

Indexing
- ISSN: 0040-4403
- OCLC no.: 992725318

Links
- Journal homepage

The Texas Journal of Science is a peer reviewed academic journal covering all areas of basic and applied sciences, as well as science education. It is published by the Texas Academy of Science. The journal is abstracted and indexed in Biological Abstracts, BIOSIS Previews, The Zoological Record, and with some interruptions Scopus. It obtained its last impact factor of 0.113 in 2010, but its listing in the Journal Citation Reports has since been discontinued.
