= Clark Hubbs =

American ichthyologist

Clark Hubbs (March 15, 1921 – February 3, 2008) was an American ichthyologist who was professor of zoology at the University of Texas from 1963 until he accepted emeritus status in 1991. He was a leading figure in ichthyology in Texas, teaching students who went on to be renowned in the field, was involved in ichthyological societies and was an editor of scientific journals. Hubbs was also an environmental activist, fighting to conserve freshwater ecosystems.

== Early life ==
Clark Hubbs was born on March 15, 1921, in Ann Arbor, Michigan. His parents were ichthyologists Carl L. Hubbs and Laura C. Hubbs. The Hubbs family undertook trips to Arkansas, Florida, and the Great Basin where they collected zoological specimens. He had a brother and two sisters. His brother, Earl, became a biology teacher and his sister, Frances, married the ichthyologist Robert Rush Miller. His other sister, Margaret, died in childhood. Their father set up a system of "allowances" for each of the children based on their success at collecting specimens; 5 cents for each species with an additional $1 if it was thought to be a taxon new to science, and $5 if it proved to be a new genus, with the last new genera being found in Nevada in 1934 and 1938.

== Education and the army ==
Hubbs gained a post as a field technician with the Michigan Institute for Fisheries Research in 1939 before attending the University of Michigan where he obtained a degree in zoology in 1942. He remained in Ann Arbor during this time. In the summer after he graduated he worked in Massachusetts surveying streams before he was conscripted into the United States Army. In the Army he served with the 96th Infantry Division in the Intelligence Section of its headquarters. The 96th was in action at Leyte and at Okinawa. Hubbs was honorably discharged from the Army in January 1946. Although he escaped being injured in combat he was, however, severely injured by being nipped in the thigh by a blue crab, the resulting injury prevented him from working for six months although he was denied any financial aid by the Workers' Compensation officials.

Following his discharge he enrolled at the University of California Los Angeles, the Hopkins Marine Station, Scripps Institution of Oceanography, and Stanford University. He received his Ph.D. from the latter institution in 1952 and he worked as an acting instructor at the Hopkins Marine Station in the summer of 1948. He joined the American Society of Ichthyologists and Herpetologists as life member in 1940.

== University of Texas ==
Hubbs was appointed as an instructor in zoology at the University of Texas in 1949, he was promoted to assistant professor in 1952, associate professor in 1957, he became the Chairman of the Division of Biological Sciences in 1974 and the Chairman of Zoology in 1978. In 1988 he was appointed the Clark Hubbs Regents Professor in Zoology and in 1991 gained emeritus status. In all, he spent 59 years working at the University of Texas and the university awarded him its Lifetime Service award. He was also a visiting professor of zoology at the University of Oklahoma and at Texas A&M University.

During his career he published over 300 papers and articles and he continued working in the field up to a month before his death. His published literature is mainly in fish, but he published some work on amphibians and an article on the fruit fly, Drosophila, albeit as fish food. He also trained over 40 masters and doctorate students in his time at the University of Texas, including Victor G. Springer and Kirk Winemiller. Hubbs deposited the material he collected at the Ichthyology Division of the Texas Natural History Collections of the Texas Memorial Museum at The University of Texas at Austin.

== Taxa described by him ==
- See Category:Taxa named by Clark Hubbs

== Other activities ==
He served as the president of the Southwestern Association of Naturalists from 1966 to 1967, the Texas Academy of Sciences from 1972 to 1973, the Texas Organization for Endangered Species from 1978 to 1979, the American Society of Ichthyologists and Herpetologists in 1987 and the American Institute of Fisheries Research Biologists from 1995 to 1997. He also spent four years as editor for the Texas Journal of Science. He went on to edit the Southwestern Naturalist and the Transactions of the American Fisheries Society. He was the editor of America's ichthyological and herpetological journal Copeia for 14 years.

He was an environmentalist and fought to protect freshwater ecosystems, appearing as a witness in court cases affecting water supply, canals and dams, for example he was an expert witness in the lawsuit over the Edwards Aquifer which saw the establishment of the Edwards Aquifer Authority to ensure that the spring flows were enough to conserve the habitat of the endangered fishes, the San Marcos gambusia and the fountain darter. His activities as an environmental activist saw him receive awards and he served on the board of the Nature Conservancy, among other organizations. He also worked on the Texas Utilities Environmental Steering Committee, Rio Grande Fishes Recovery Team, Hubbs Sea World Research Institute, the University of Texas Marine Sciences Institute, and the southwestern division of the Environmental Defense Fund.

Hubbs started to publish a checklist, The Fishes of Texas, during the 1960s and in the 1980s colleagues and students associated with Hubbs began to add additional information about each fish species. Hubbs wanted to turn this into a book and he labored on this project, collaborating with others until his death. However, they realized that an electronic format would reach more people and so The Fishes of Texas Online project began.

== Taxa named in his honor ==
Hubbs had at least three species of fish named in his honor:

- The signal triplefin, Lepidonectes clarkhubbsi Bussing, 1991
- Menidia clarkhubbsi, and
- Gambusia clarkhubbsi.

== Personal life ==
Hubbs met Catherine V. Symons on a field trip with the Stanford University Natural History Club and married her in 1949. His parents had met in a similar fashion. They had three children: Laura (born 1950), John (born 1952) and Anne (born 1955). Hubbs was known for his collection of clothing depicting fish. Hubbs died from cancer in Austin on February 3, 2008.
