= Kirk Winemiller =

American ecologist (born 1956)

Kirk Owen Winemiller
- Born: April 4, 1956 (age 70); Richland County, Ohio, United States
- Education: Miami University; University of Texas
- Known for: Fish ecology Life history theory Food web ecology
- Scientific career
- Fields: Ecology
- Workplaces: Oak Ridge National Laboratory; Texas A&M University
- Doctoral advisors: Eric Pianka, Clark Hubbs

Kirk O. Winemiller is an American ecologist, known for research on community ecology, life history theory, food webs, aquatic ecosystems, tropical ecology and fish biology. A strong interest of his has been convergent evolution and patterns, causes and consequences of biological diversity, particularly with respect to fishes. His research also has addressed the influence of hydrology on the ecological dynamics of fluvial ecosystems and applications of this knowledge for managing aquatic biodiversity and freshwater resources in the United States and other regions of the world. He currently is a University Distinguished Professor Emeritus and Regents Professor Emeritus at Texas A&M University and an Elected Fellow of the Ecological Society of America, American Fisheries Society and the American Association for the Advancement of Science.

== Works ==
Winemiller has produced more than 300 scientific papers and 30 book chapters on topics ranging from food web ecology to the evolutionary ecology of fishes. He coauthored the books "The Science of Instream Flows: A Review of the Texas Instream Flow Program" (2005, National Academies Press) and "Peacock Bass: Diversity, Ecology and Conservation" (2021, with L.C. Kelso Winemiller and C.G. Montaña Elsevier), and with G.A. Polis coedited the book "Food Webs: Integration of Patterns and Dynamics" (1996, reprinted in 2013 by Springer Science). In 1992, he received the Mercer Award from the Ecological Society of America in recognition for his paper on food web ecology published in Ecological Monographs (1990) and which formed a part of his doctoral dissertation (1987).

Winemiller's early research on the life history of fish species resulted in the development of the triangular continuum, or E-P-O (Equilibrium-Periodic-Opportunistic) model. The model arose from an analysis of reproductive traits and demographic parameters using his own field-derived datasets and data compiled via review of hundreds of articles and reports (Winemiller 1989, Winemiller & Rose 1992). Building on these analyses, fundamental inferences were developed that unified earlier life history continua in one dimension, such as fast vs. slow life histories, and r vs. K strategists. The E-P-O model integrated, and to an extent reconciled, the much-debated r/K and bet-hedging theories. The E-P-O model predicts how spatial and temporal environmental variation influences selection for reproductive strategies, and further explains previously identified tradeoffs among demographic variables. The model has helped to clarify the influence of density dependence during population responses to harvest and environmental disturbances over variable scales of space and time.

Winemiller also made influential contributions in food web ecology, the study of networks of species interactions. His extensive field studies, laboratory dietary and isotopic analyses, and quantitative innovations revealed that networks of predator-prey interactions were far more complex than had been previously described. He discovered that the structure of freshwater and estuarine food webs was strongly influenced by seasonal environmental variation, selection of methods, units and resolution scales for network components, and species life history strategies influencing population dynamics and relative abundances of consumers and resources. This body of work, together with his research on fish community ecology, reveals how functional traits influence the manner that organisms respond to abiotic and biotic environmental features. Winemiller has been a proponent of the idea that universal form-function relationships and constraints result in widespread convergence of species adaptations and the structure of ecological communities in similar environments.

== Selected bibliography ==
- Winemiller, K.O. 1989. Patterns of variation in life history among South American fishes in seasonal environments. Oecologia 81:225-241.
- Winemiller, K.O. 1990. Spatial and temporal variation in tropical fish trophic networks. Ecological Monographs 60:331-367.
- Winemiller, K.O. and E.R. Pianka. 1990. Organization in natural assemblages of desert lizards and tropical fishes. Ecological Monographs 60:27-55.
- Winemiller, K.O. 1991. Ecomorphological diversification of freshwater fish assemblages from five biotic regions. Ecological Monographs 61:343-365.
- Winemiller, K.O. 1992. Life history strategies and the effectiveness of sexual selection. Oikos 62:318-327.
- Winemiller, K.O. and K.A. Rose. 1992. Patterns of life-history diversification in North American fishes: implications for population regulation. Canadian Journal of Fisheries and Aquatic Sciences 49:2196-2218.
- Winemiller, K.O. and K.A. Rose. 1993. Why do most fish produce so many tiny offspring? Evidence from a size-based model. American Naturalist 142:585-603.
- Winemiller, K.O., L.C. Kelso-Winemiller, and A.L. Brenkert. 1995. Ecomorphological diversification and convergence in fluvial cichlid fishes. Environmental Biology of Fishes 44:235-261.
- Winemiller, K.O. 1996. Dynamic diversity: Fish communities of tropical rivers. Pages 99–134, In: M.L. Cody and J.A. Smallwood, eds. Long-term Studies of Vertebrate Communities. Academic Press, Orlando, Florida.
- Winemiller, K.O. and D.B. Jepsen. 1998. Effects of seasonality and fish movement on tropical river food webs. Journal of Fish Biology 53 (Supplement A):267-296.
- Winemiller, K.O., E.R. Pianka, L.J. Vitt, and A. Joern. 2001. Food web laws or niche theory? Six independent empirical tests. American Naturalist 158:193-199.
- Winemiller, K.O. 2004. Floodplain river food webs: generalizations and implications for fisheries management. Pages 285–309 in: Proceedings of the Second International Symposium on the Management of Large Rivers for Fisheries Volume II. R. Welcomme, and T. Petr, editors. Regional Office for Asia and the Pacific, Bangkok, Thailand. RAP Publication 2004/16.
- Winemiller, K.O. 2005. Life history strategies, population regulation, and their implications for fisheries management. Canadian Journal of Fisheries and Aquatic Sciences 62:872-885.
- Winemiller, K.O. and C.A. Layman. 2005. Food web science: moving on the path from abstraction to prediction. Pages 10–23 in: Dynamic Food Webs: Multispecies Assemblages, Ecosystem Development and Environmental Change, P.C. de Ruiter, V. Wolters, and J.C. Moore, editors. Elsevier, Amsterdam.
- Winemiller, K.O., H. López Fernández, D.C. Taphorn, L.G. Nico, and A. Barbarino Duque. 2008. Fish assemblages of the Casiquiare River, a corridor and zoogeographic filter for dispersal between the Orinoco and Amazon basins. Journal of Biogeography 35:1551-1563.
- Winemiller, K.O., A.S. Flecker, and D.J. Hoeinghaus. 2010. Patch dynamics and environmental heterogeneity in lotic ecosystems. Journal of the North American Benthological Society 29:84-99.
- Winemiller, K.O., D.L. Roelke, J.B. Cotner, J.V. Montoya, L. Sanchez, M.M. Castillo, C.G. Montaña, and C.A. Layman. 2014. Pulsing hydrology determines top-down control of basal resources in a tropical river-floodplain ecosystem. Ecological Monographs 84(4):621-635.
- Winemiller, K.O., D.B. Fitzgerald, L.M. Bower, and E.R. Pianka. 2015. Functional traits, convergent evolution, and periodic tables of niches. Ecology Letters 18:737-751.
- Winemiller, K.O. and 39 coauthors. 2016. Balancing hydropower and biodiversity in the Amazon, Congo, and Mekong: Basin-scale planning is needed to minimize impacts in mega-diverse rivers. Science 351/6269:128-129.
- Winemiller, K.O. 2017. Food web dynamics when divergent life history strategies respond to environmental variation differently: a fisheries ecology perspective. pp. 306–323 In: Adaptive Food Webs: Stability and Transitions of Real and Model Ecosystems, J. Moore, P. de Ruiter, K. McCann and V. Wolters, Editors, Cambridge University Press, Cambridge, UK.
- Winemiller K.O. 2018. Trends in Biodiversity: Freshwater. pp. 151–161 In: The Encyclopedia of the Anthropocene, Volume 3, D.A. DellaSala and M.I. Goldstein, Editors, Elsevier, Oxford, UK; also published online as Reference Module in Earth Systems and Environmental Science, Elsevier Science Direct.
- Winemiller, K.O., L.C. Kelso Winemiller, and C.G. Montaña. 2021. Peacock Bass: Diversity, Ecology and Conservation. Academic Press, Elsevier, 305 pp.
- Winemiller, K.O., J.S. Perkin, J.F. Trungale, D.J. Hoeinghaus, G.W. Moore, A.N. Schwalb, Z.A. Mitchell, A. Trimble, C. Reeves, M.R. Acre, K. Wheeler, T.B. Hardy, and D. Buzan. 2024. Advancing the state of environmental flows science: monitoring, hindcasting and forecasting flow-ecology relationships. Fisheries 49(8):353-368.

== See also ==
- Category:Taxa named by Kirk O. Winemiller

Ammoglanis pulex

Cichla cataractae

Neolebias lozii

Schistura diminuta

Serranochromis altus

- Species named after Kirk O. Winemiller

Geophagus winemilleri
