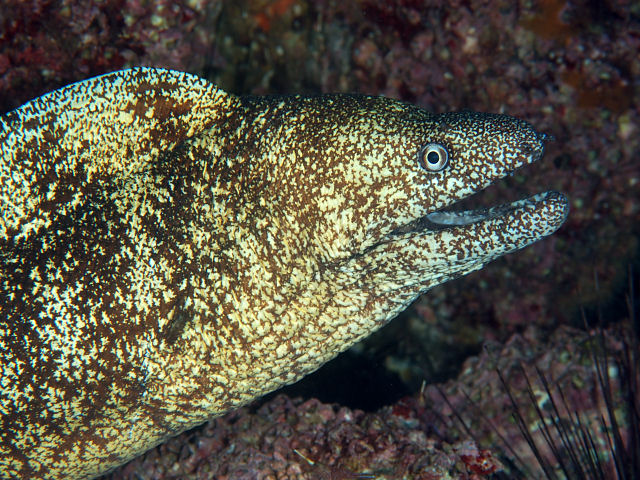

Conservation status
- Least Concern (IUCN 3.1)

Scientific classification
- Kingdom: Animalia
- Phylum: Chordata
- Class: Actinopterygii
- Division: Teleostei
- Order: Anguilliformes
- Family: Muraenidae
- Genus: Gymnothorax
- Species: G. kidako

Binomial name
- Gymnothorax kidako (Temminck & Schlegel, 1846)

Synonyms
- Muraena kidako Temminck & Schlegel, 1846

= Kidako moray =

Species of fish

The Kidako moray (Gymnothorax kidako) is a species of marine fish in the family Muraenidae. It inhabits coral reefs or lagoons and can be found in tropical and subtropical seas near Taiwan and Japan. The species is diurnal, which means it is more active in the daytime than the nighttime. It is also piscivorous: it consumes fish, octopus, and squid. Other than the Kidako moray, there are about 200 species of moray eels in the Muraenidae family. The Kidako moray doesn't attack humans unless they are provoked. However, due to the menacing looks of the Kidako moray and moray eels in general, they are feared by divers and snorkelers.

== Description ==
The Kidako moray is a medium size fish that can reach a maximum length of 91cm. It has a brownish color with white spots (snowflake-like) on its head, body and fins. It also has a pattern of blotches all over its body. They continue onto its tail. However, some of the patterns disappear as they get closer to the tail. The snout and chin are brown with yellow streaks.

== Distribution and habitat ==
Morays are commonly found in warm-temperature areas like tropical and subtropical seas. Specifically, the Kidako moray is found throughout the western Pacific area from Taiwan to Japan. The Kidako moray usually inhabits coral reefs or lagoons. They hide in rocky bottoms, but they expose their heads occasionally. Some of them also reside in waters up to 400 meters deep, where there is a lower temperature compared to the shallower areas where most of the moray eels inhabit. In addition, morays are usually known to be nocturnal; however, observation has discovered that many of them are also diurnal.

Sometimes, the Kidako moray, which is quite common in some areas in Japan, is used for food. It is harvested in some minor commercial fisheries.

== Dietary habits ==
The Kidako moray is piscivorous. It consumes fish and cephalopods such as octopuses and squids to survive. The dietary habits of morays could be divided into two types, piscivory and durophagy. Feeding types differ depending on the sharpness of the teeth as well as the shape or size of the jaws. The species that have long caniniform teeth are more likely to consume octopus, fish, and crustaceans occasionally. On the other hand, species with molariform or short caniniform teeth tend to consume more on crustaceans.

== Taxonomy ==
The Kidako moray belongs to the genus called Gymnothorax under the Muraenidae family with other 15 genera, including Anarchias, Channomuraena, Cirrimaxilla, Diaphenchelys, Echidna, Enchelyore, Enchelynassa, Gymnomuraena, Monopenchelys, Muraena, Pseudechidna, Rhinomuraena, Scuticaria, Strophidon, and Uropterygius. According to some studies, the Muraenidae family originated 34 to 54 million years ago in the Pacific Ocean. There are approximately 200 species of moray eels split across 16 genera globally. Some species of moray eels are commonly served as a delicacy in various countries such as Portugal, Japan, and Vietnam. Moreover, there are around 122 species under the genus Gymnothorax.

== Relationships with humans ==
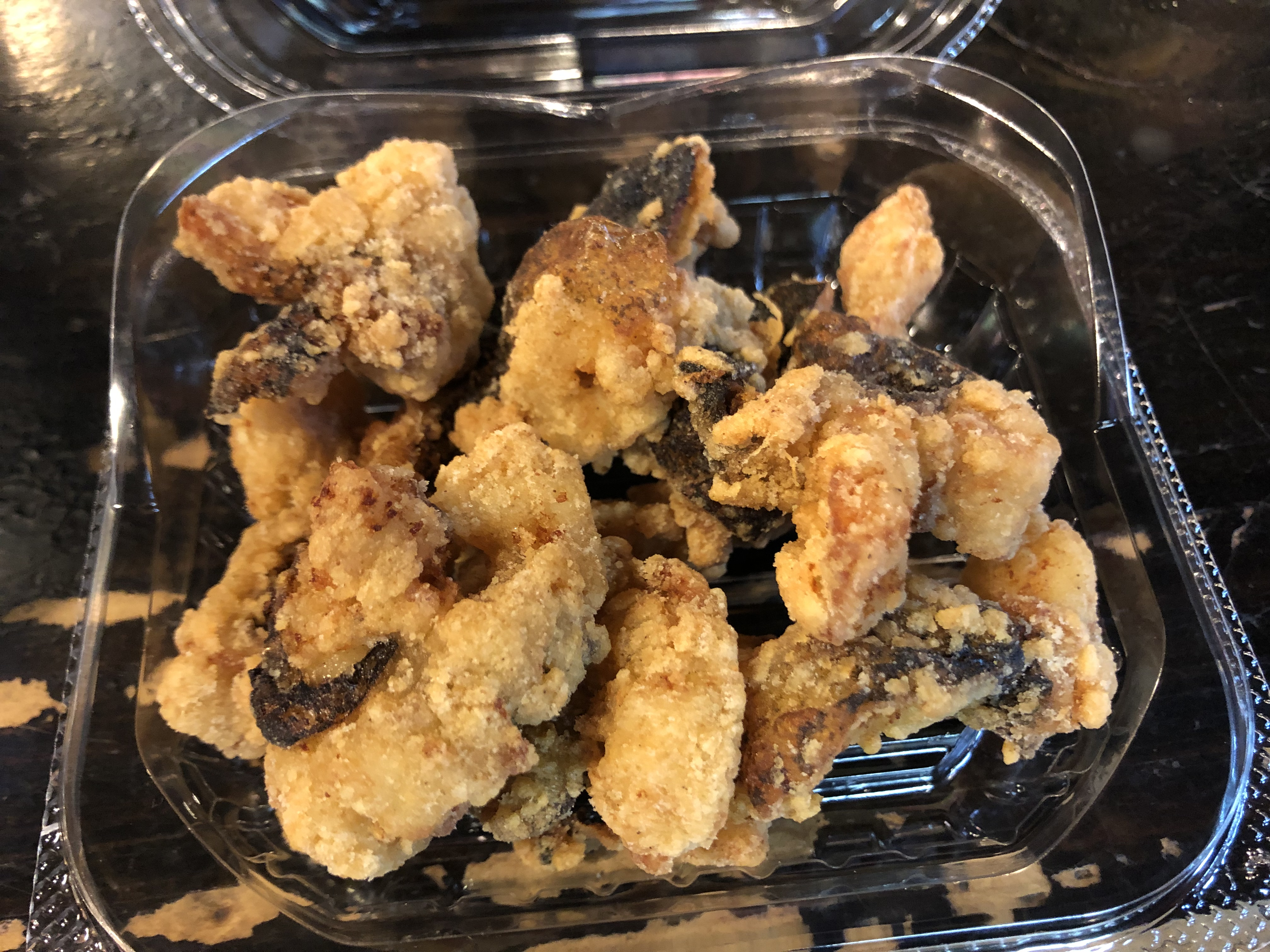
Japanese utsubo karaage, or deep fried eel

It is rare for moray to make unprovoked attacks on humans. When threatened, the eels activate a protection mechanism by extending their jaws widely to the direction of the threat when encountering an intruder. However, moray eel attacks are rare and normally the result of a diver placing their hand into a hole in the reef.

Some species of the moray eels are also able to cause wounds. Three similar cases were found during research of moray eels, and the common facts between those three were that all moray eels had serrated teeth. Researchers speculated that they were venomous, however, no study has been able to prove this.

=== As food ===
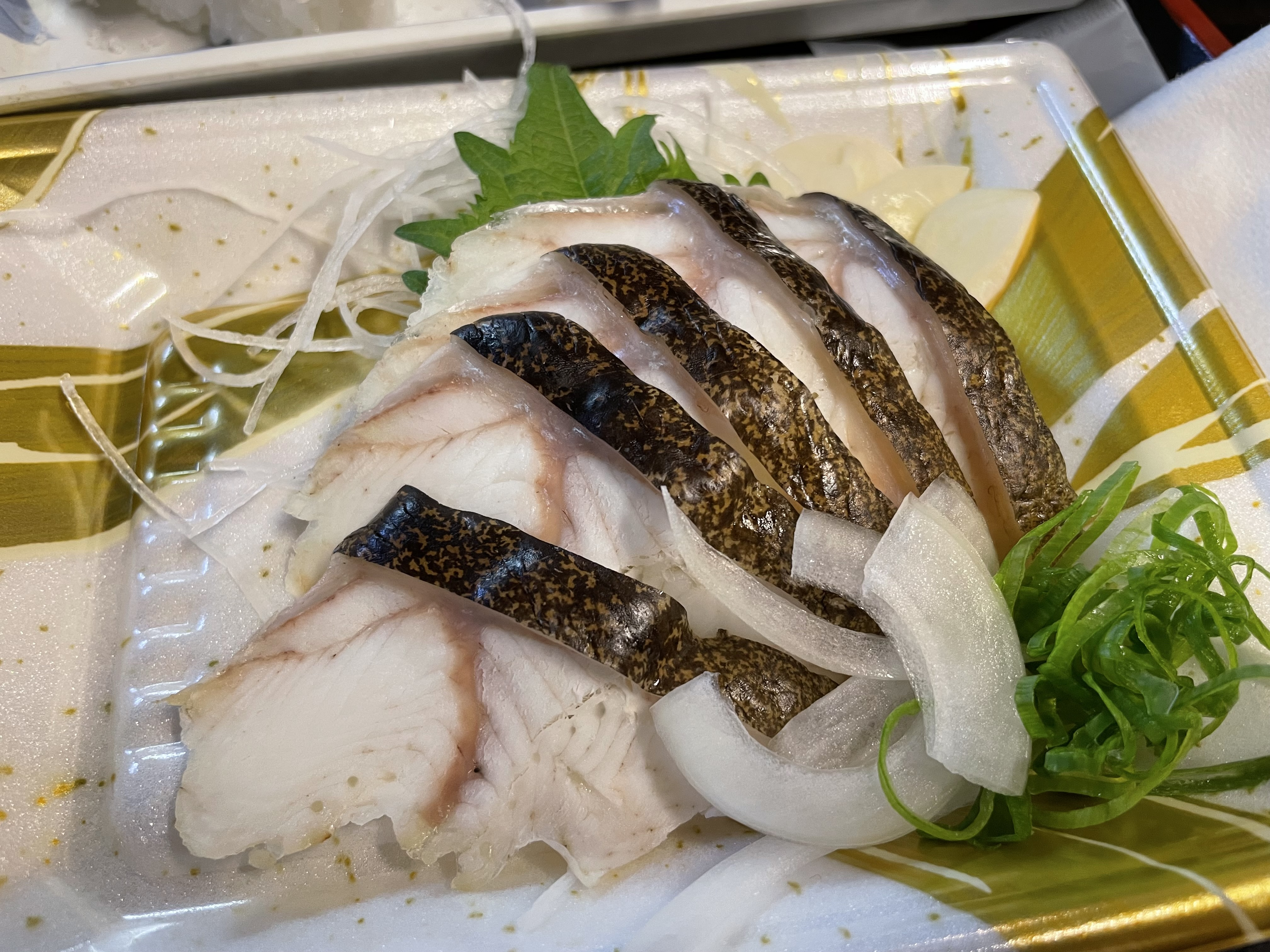
Japanese utsubo tataki, sliced eel

Kidako moray is eaten in Japan, where it is called utsubo, although this name is also used for other moray eels.

Few death cases were reported from consuming moray eels. As moray eels are being used as food in some places, fish poisoning has the chance to happen. On Saipan island, 57 people were reportedly poisoned by consuming moray 12 inches thick. This caused 2 deaths and 14 of them became comatose. Later in the investigation, it was found to be a typical ciguatera poisoning. The poison has a highly toxic compound that could show its highest levels in a large moray.

== Anatomy ==
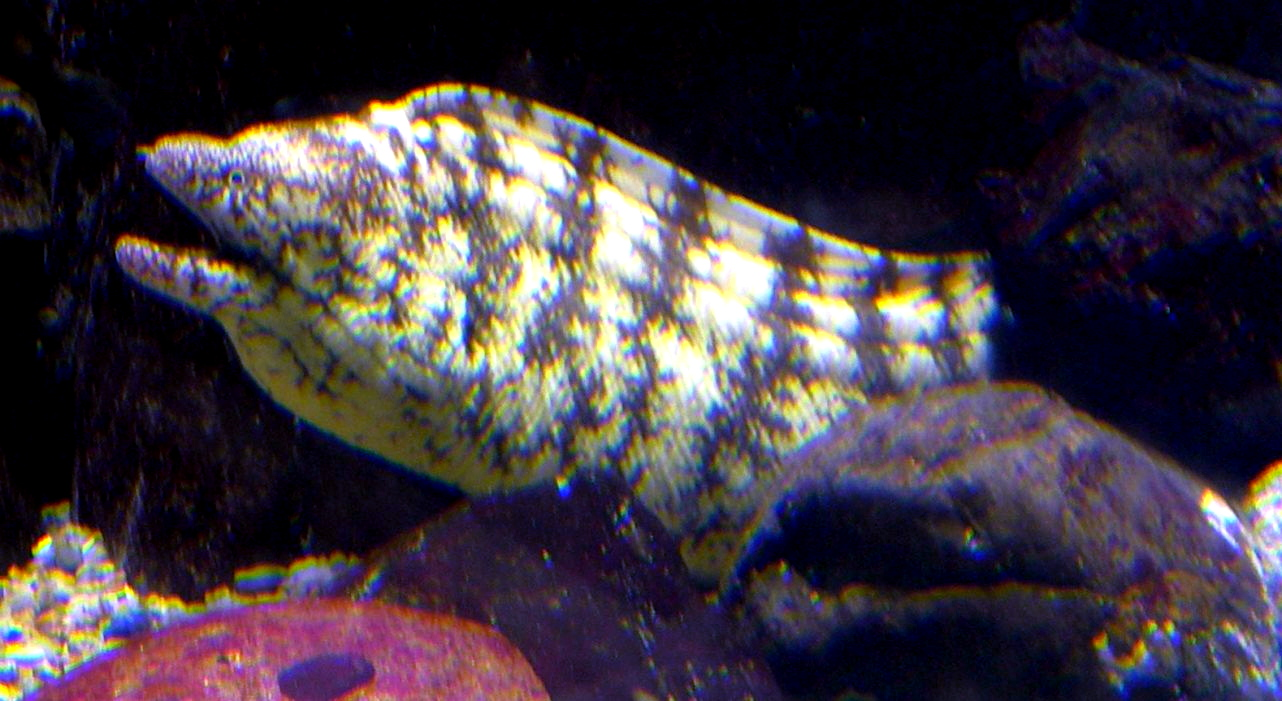
Head

Pharyngeal jaws of moray eels

=== Jaw ===
Moray eels have pharyngeal jaws and are categorised into two types of feeding habits, piscivorous or durophagous. The piscivorous morays have longer jaws and teeth, and narrower heads compared to durophagous morays. Durophagous morays have shorter jaws, short, blunt teeth, and larger depths of dentary. The Kidako moray falls into the category of piscivorous with pharyngeal jaws. The jaws of the Kidako moray, or moray eels in general, hold a dual-jaw system for feeding. They primarily use the oral jaws to deliver prey into the esophagus with sharp and piercing teeth. The teeth are curved backward and point towards its throat to avoid prey coming back out of its mouth. After they transport prey, they use the pharyngeal jaws to crush it. During pre-digestion, the pharyngeal jaws crush, shred, and prepare prey for digestion. Moreover, a piscivorous moray is also assumed to have larger adductor muscles in the pharyngeal jaws for them to be able to carry and transport large fish.

=== Teeth ===
The Kidako moray generally has large and uniserial teeth except for small specimens. It has six large teeth on the peripheral part of the inter-maxillary segment with the smallest pair at the most anatomical position. Others include 1 to 3 tiny flanking teeth, 3 long median teeth, and 8 to 16 maxillary teeth. However, the size decreases posteriorly. On the contrary, specimens with less than 300mm have 1 to 3 inner teeth, and 4 to 14 tiny and staggered teeth on vomer which is hard to find on large specimens. Small specimens also have 2 to 4 large or 1 to 4 small teeth anteriorly. Unlike the large specimens, small specimens have 13 to 23 teeth that continue as row and become larger as it is closer to the back.

=== Length-weight relationships ===
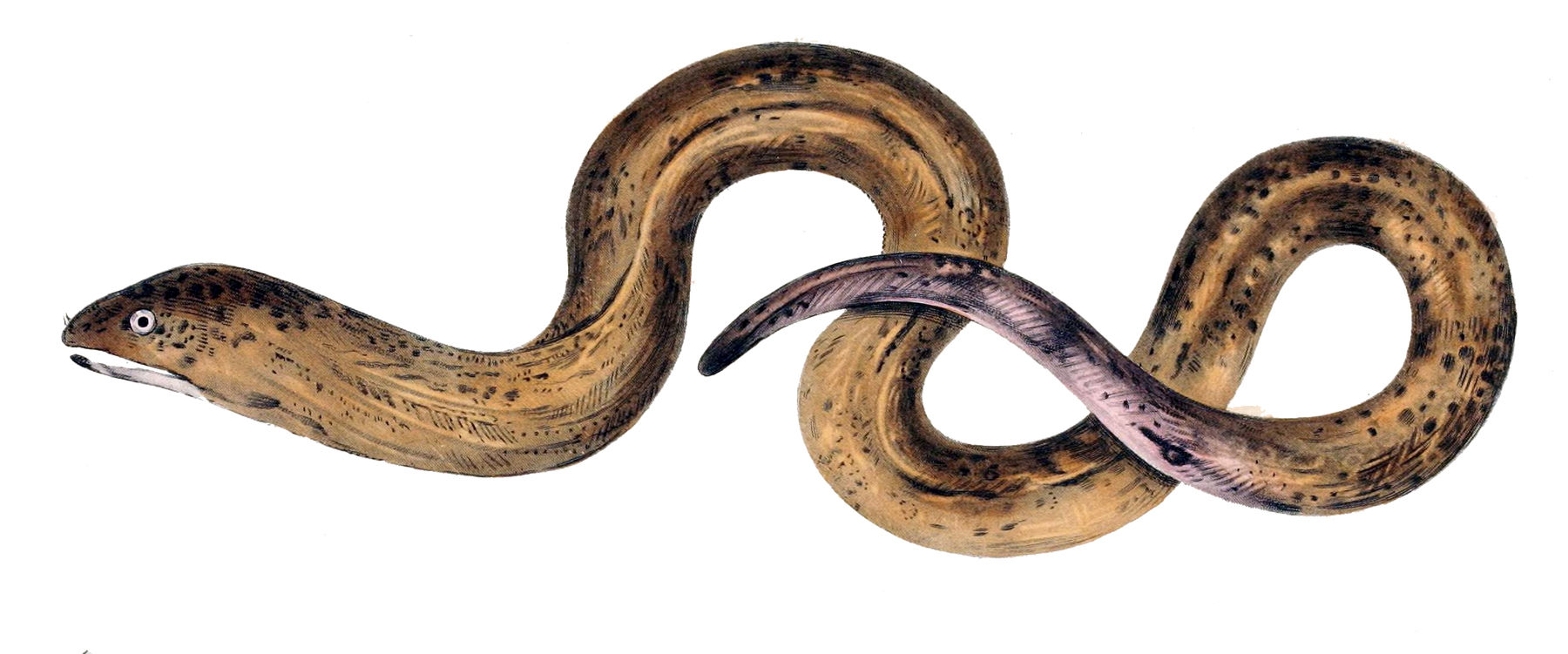
Gymnothorax Kidako

Further research by Loh has found that there is a relationship between the length and the weight of moray eels, including the Kidako moray. Luh measured from the tip of the closed mouth to the beginning of the anal fin rays. Its head width is the width from suspensorium to suspensorium with the mouth closed. Head length is the distance from the tip of the rostrum to the neurocranium-vertebral joint and head height is measured from the bottom of the dentary directly below the eye to the top of the head above the eye. The table below shows the data from 9 samples of the Kidako moray. The average standard length of the Kidako moray being observed is approximately 63.15 cm and the average weight of the Kidako moray being observed is approximately 627.25g. The length range and weight range are broad due to the combined sexes of samples. However, these data are broad enough to carry out a conclusion that length and weight are correlated as the $r^2$ is above 0.90. The correlations between the length and the weight are also found from other moray eels such as G. chilospilus, G. meleagris, and G. pictus.

			length (cm)		weight (g)		
Species	sex	n (sample size)	min	max	min	max	$r^2$
Kidako moray	Female & Male	9	39.4	86.9	65.2	1189.3	0.906
