= Channomuraena bauchotae =

Conservation status
- Data Deficient (IUCN 3.1)

Scientific classification
- Kingdom: Animalia
- Phylum: Chordata
- Class: Actinopterygii
- Order: Anguilliformes
- Family: Muraenidae
- Genus: Channomuraena
- Species: C. bauchotae

Binomial name
- Channomuraena bauchotae Saldanha & Quéro, 1994

Species of fish

Channomuraena bauchotae, the Réunion broadbanded moray, is a moray eel found in the western Indian Ocean. It inhabits rocky coasts.
