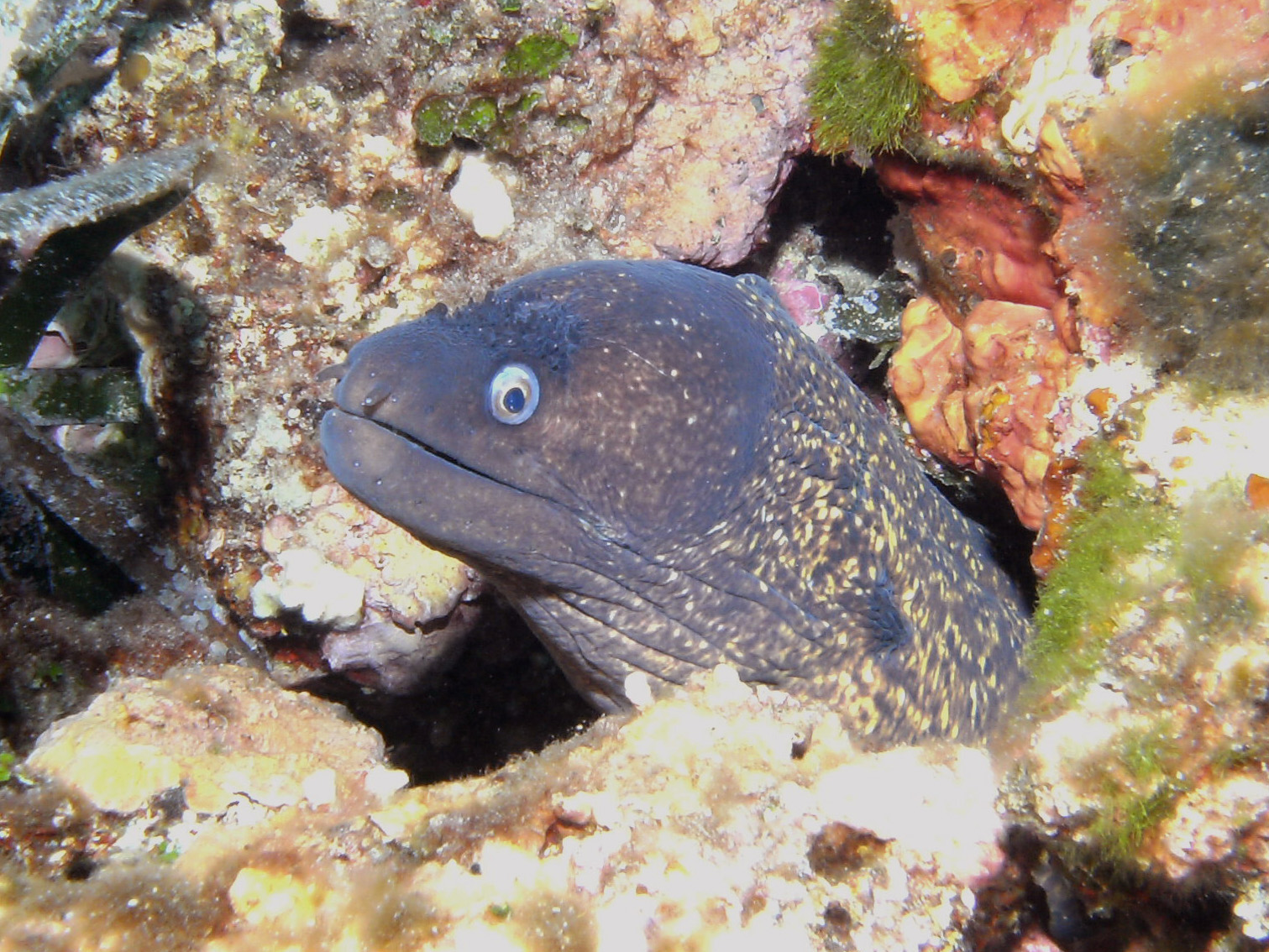
- Muraenales represented by a Mediterranean moray, (Muraena helena)
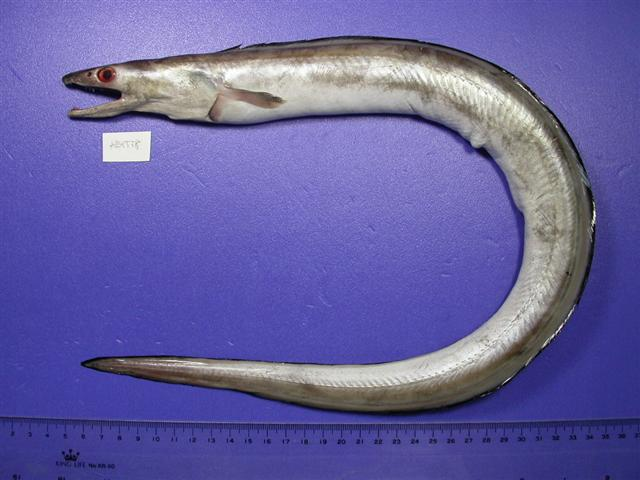
- Congrales, represented by a darkfin pike eel (Muraenesox cinereus)

Scientific classification
- Kingdom: Animalia
- Phylum: Chordata
- Class: Actinopterygii
- Order: Anguilliformes
- Suborder: Muraenoidei; Fitzinger, 1832

Families
- see text

= Muraenoidei =

Suborder of fishes

Muraenoidei is a suborder of mainly marine ray-finned fishes belonging to the order Anguilliformes, the eels. The eels in this suborder are distributed in the tropical and temperate seas around the world.

== Families ==
The Muraenoidei contains the following nine families:

- Infraorder Muraenales
  - Family Heterenchelyidae Regan, 1912 (mud eels)
  - Family Myrocongridae Gill, 1890 (myroconger eels)
  - Family Muraenidae Rafinesque, 1815 (moray eels)
    - Subfamily Uropterygiinae Fowler, 1925 (tailfin moray eels)
    - Subfamily Muraeninae Rafinesque, 1815 (morays)
- Infraorder Congrales
  - Family Colocongridae Smith, 1976 (shorttail eels)
  - Family Derichthyidae Gill, 1884 (longneck eels or narrowneck eels)
  - Family Ophichthidae Günther, 1870 (snake eels and worm eels)
    - Subfamily Myrophinae Kaup, 1856 (worm eels)
    - Subfamily Ophichthinae Günther, 1870 (snake eels)
  - Family Muraenesocidae Kaup, 1859 (pike conger eels)
  - Family Nettastomatidae Kaup, 1859 (duckbill eels)
  - Family Congridae Kaup, 1856 (conger eels)
    - Subfamily Congrinae Kaup, 1856 (congers)
    - Subfamily Bathymyrinae Böhlke, 1949
    - Subfamily Heterocongrinae Günther, 1870 (garden eels)
