= Mud-dwelling moray =

Conservation status
- Data Deficient (IUCN 3.1)

Scientific classification
- Kingdom: Animalia
- Phylum: Chordata
- Class: Actinopterygii
- Order: Anguilliformes
- Family: Muraenidae
- Subfamily: Muraeninae
- Genus: Diaphenchelys; McCosker & J. E. Randall, 2007
- Species: D. pelonates

Binomial name
- Diaphenchelys pelonates McCosker & J. E. Randall, 2007

Species of fish

The mud-dwelling moray (Diaphenchelys pelonates) is a species of eel in the family Muraenidae It was described by John E. McCosker and John Ernest Randall in 2007. It is a marine, tropical eel which is known from Indonesia, in the western Pacific Ocean. It dwells at a depth range of 15 to 32 metres (49 to 105 ft), and inhabits muddy bottoms, from which its species epithet, "pelonates" (translating literally as "mud dweller", from Ancient Greek, and treated as a noun in apposition), is derived. Males can reach a maximum total length of 46.5 centimetres (18.3 in).
