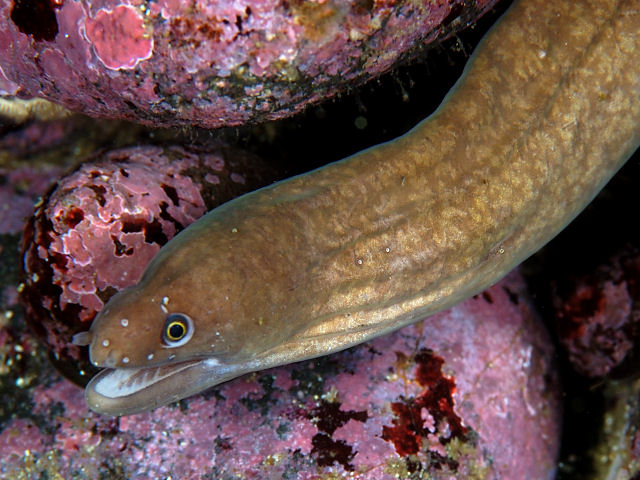
- Anarchias seychellensis

Scientific classification
- Kingdom: Animalia
- Phylum: Chordata
- Class: Actinopterygii
- Order: Anguilliformes
- Family: Muraenidae
- Subfamily: Uropterygiinae; Fowler, 1925

= Uropterygiinae =

Subfamily of fishes

Uropterygiinae is a subfamily of moray eels.

== Genera ==
- Anarchias D. S. Jordan & Starks, 1906
- Channomuraena Richardson, 1848
- Cirrimaxilla H.-M. Chen & K.-T .Shao, 1995
- Scuticaria D. S. Jordan & Snyder, 1901
- Uropterygius Rüppell, 1838
