= Diaphenchelys =

Scientific classification
- Kingdom: Animalia
- Phylum: Chordata
- Class: Actinopterygii
- Order: Anguilliformes
- Family: Muraenidae
- Subfamily: Muraeninae
- Genus: Diaphenchelys; McCosker & Randall, 2007

Type species
- Diaphenchelys pelonates McCosker & Randall, 2007

Species
- 3, see text.

Genus of fishes

Diaphenchelys is a genus of moray eels in the family Muraenidae.

== Species ==
There are currently 3 recognized species in this genus:

- Diaphenchelys dalmatian Hibino, Satapoomin & Kimura, 2017 (Dalmatian moray eel)
- Diaphenchelys laimospila Huang, Smith & Liao, 2021 (Spotted-throat moray)
- Diaphenchelys pelonates McCosker & Randall, 2007 (Mud-dwelling moray)
