= Channomuraena vittata =

Conservation status
- Least Concern (IUCN 3.1)

Scientific classification
- Kingdom: Animalia
- Phylum: Chordata
- Class: Actinopterygii
- Order: Anguilliformes
- Family: Muraenidae
- Genus: Channomuraena
- Species: C. vittata

Binomial name
- Channomuraena vittata (J. Richardson, 1845)

Species of fish

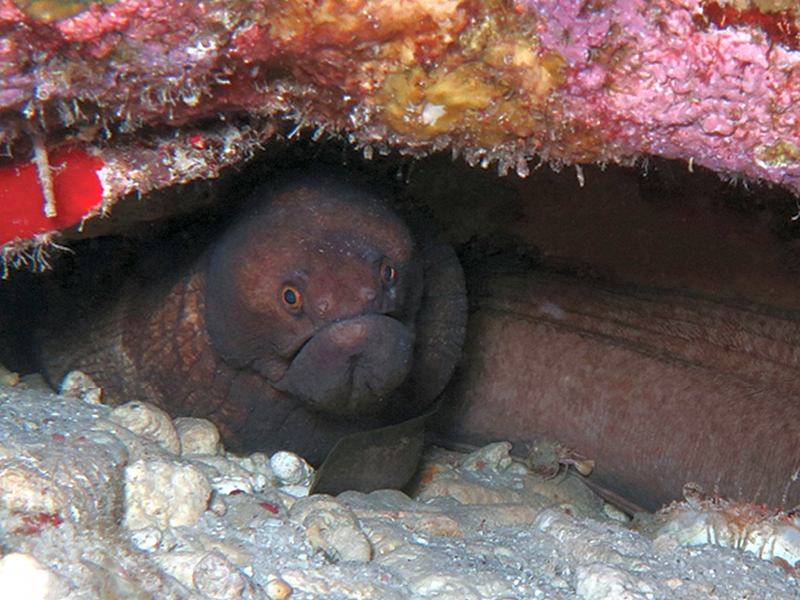
A specimen of Channomuraena vittata found in reefs off the coast of Bonaire, Lesser Antilles

Channomuraena vittata is a species of moray eel from the Anguiliformes order found in reefs. It is commonly known as the broadbanded moray, banded moray, Chinese moray, double-ended moray, or the long-jawed moray.

== Detailed description ==
The broadbanded moray is a large, thick, muscular moray that can grow up to 150 cm (59 in) in length, although its common length is 80 cm (31 in). The fins are confined to the posterior part of the tail, which is short and lacks pectoral and pelvic fins. It has no scales and produces a mucus over its thick skin. It has rather small eyes positioned at the end of the short snout. It has numerous and short, sharp teeth inserted into a large and profound jaw that extends back into the head. In addition, there is a second jaw, the pharyngeal jaw located further down the throat, used to capture and transport the prey into the throat. It possesses a posterior nostril in short tube. It has gills positioned far back behind the head. Its anus is located at the posterior third of the total length of its body.

== Determination sign ==
The distinctive features are the small cranium, the anterior position of the eyes, an enlarged lower jaw that projects beyond upper jaw and 13 to 16 dark bars or bands throughout the body.

== Occurrence ==
Only native cases have been found, so it is not invasive to anywhere.

Atlantic Ocean: Ascension Island, the Cape Verde Islands, Annobon Island, and Sao Tome Island, Bermuda, the Bahamas, in the Gulf of Mexico from northwestern Cuba, in the Caribbean from Mona Island, Puerto Rico to St. Vincent, Colombia, Curaçao to Margarita Island, St. Paul's Rocks and Brazil (Bahia).

Indo-pacific: Reunion and Mauritius and Christmas Island, Palau, and the Hawaiian Islands, Kiribati Island, Palmyra Island, Micronesia (Pohnpei), Indonesia (Bali).

== Ecology ==
Habitat: Subtidal rocks, rocky reefs and coral reefs. It is an uncommon bottom dwelling species. Uniquely snake-like in appearance and behavior, it is a benthic and solitary species mostly found in outer reef slopes under ledges and in holes. It is secretive and nocturnal.

Depth range: 5–100 metres (20–330 ft), but usually around 40 metres (130 ft) of depth.

== Food ==
Being a relatively newly discovered species, its feeding habits are still unknown.

== Spawning ==
Moray eels are known to have very long migrations for spawning in open waters, where the eggs are then fertilized by the male outside of the female's body, yet the spawning rituals specific for the broadbanded moray are still unknown, as they are hard to capture.

== Importance ==
This species is captured occasionally and consumed in local fisheries. It is also known to be sought for aquarium fish trade.

== Conservation/risk ==
There are currently no major threats to this species apart from the occasional impact from local fisheries and the aquarium trade.

There are no species-specific conservation measures.

According to the IUCN Red List Status, it is classified as Least Concern.
