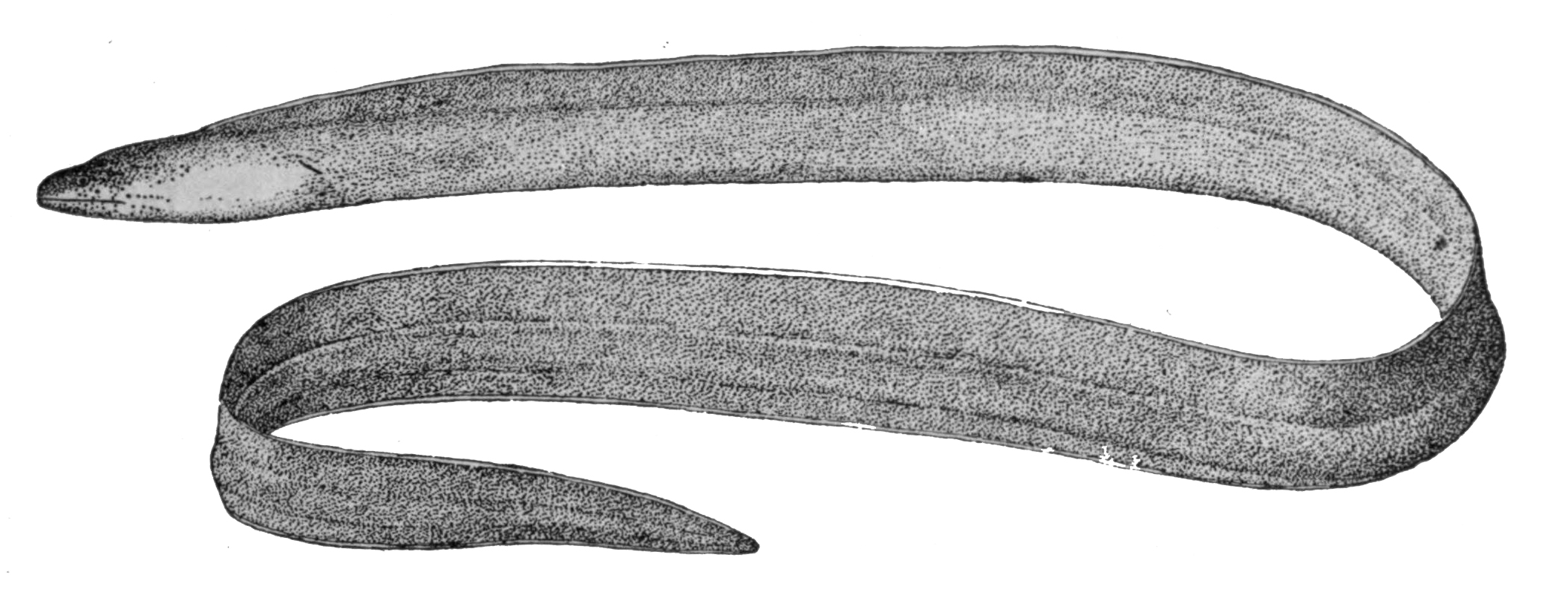

Conservation status
- Least Concern (IUCN 3.1)

Scientific classification
- Kingdom: Animalia
- Phylum: Chordata
- Class: Actinopterygii
- Order: Anguilliformes
- Family: Muraenidae
- Subfamily: Muraeninae
- Genus: Pseudechidna; Bleeker, 1863
- Species: P. brummeri

Binomial name
- Pseudechidna brummeri (Bleeker, 1858)

= White ribbon eel =

Species of fish

The white ribbon eel or ghost eel, Pseudechidna brummeri, is a species of saltwater eels, the only member of the genus Pseudechidna of the Muraenidae (Moray eel) family. It is found in the Indo-Pacific oceans from the western Indian Ocean to Samoa, and north to the Ryukyu Islands. Its length is 8–30 inches (20–76 cm).

The eel is centered around "Indonesia, Papua New Guinea, New Caledonia, and Fiji". It can also occur in Australian waters, although live sightings of the species are exceptionally rare with only three recorded incidents as of 2025. The eel can sometimes be mistaken for a flatworm.

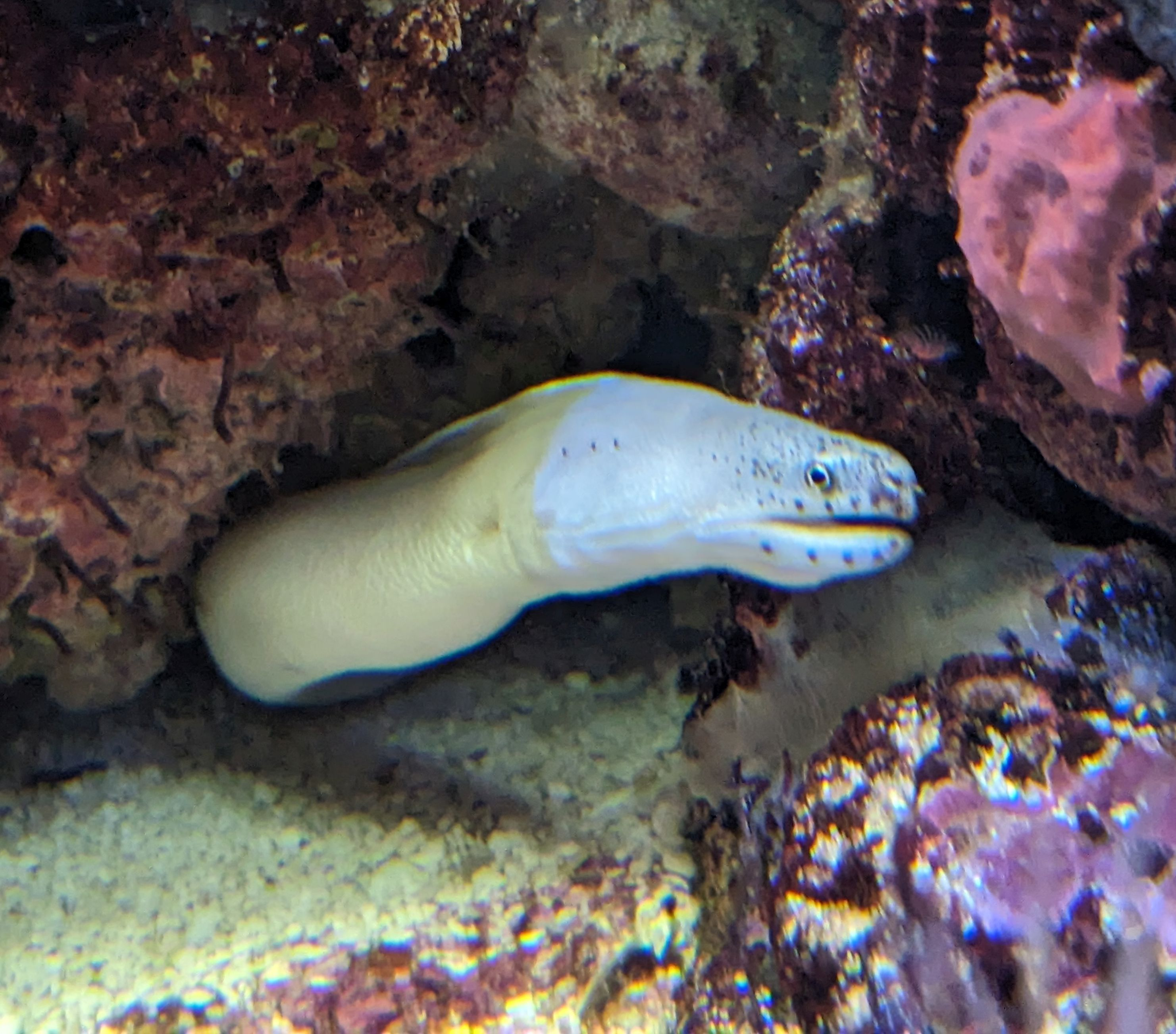
White ribbon eel in captivity
