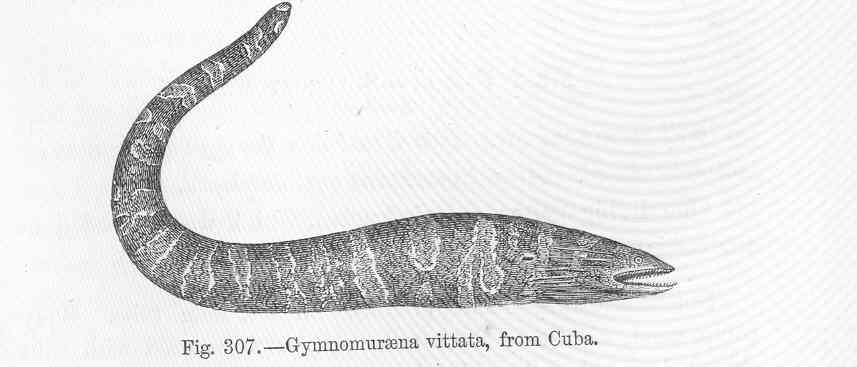
- Illustration of the Channomuraena

Scientific classification
- Kingdom: Animalia
- Phylum: Chordata
- Class: Actinopterygii
- Order: Anguilliformes
- Family: Muraenidae
- Subfamily: Uropterygiinae
- Genus: Channomuraena; J. Richardson, 1848

Type species
- Ichthyophis vittatus Richardson, 1845

Species
- See text.

= Channomuraena =

Genus of fishes

Channomuraena is a genus of moray eels in the family Muraenidae.

== Species ==
- Channomuraena bauchotae Saldanha & Quéro, 1994
- Channomuraena vittata (J. Richardson, 1845) (Broadbanded moray)
