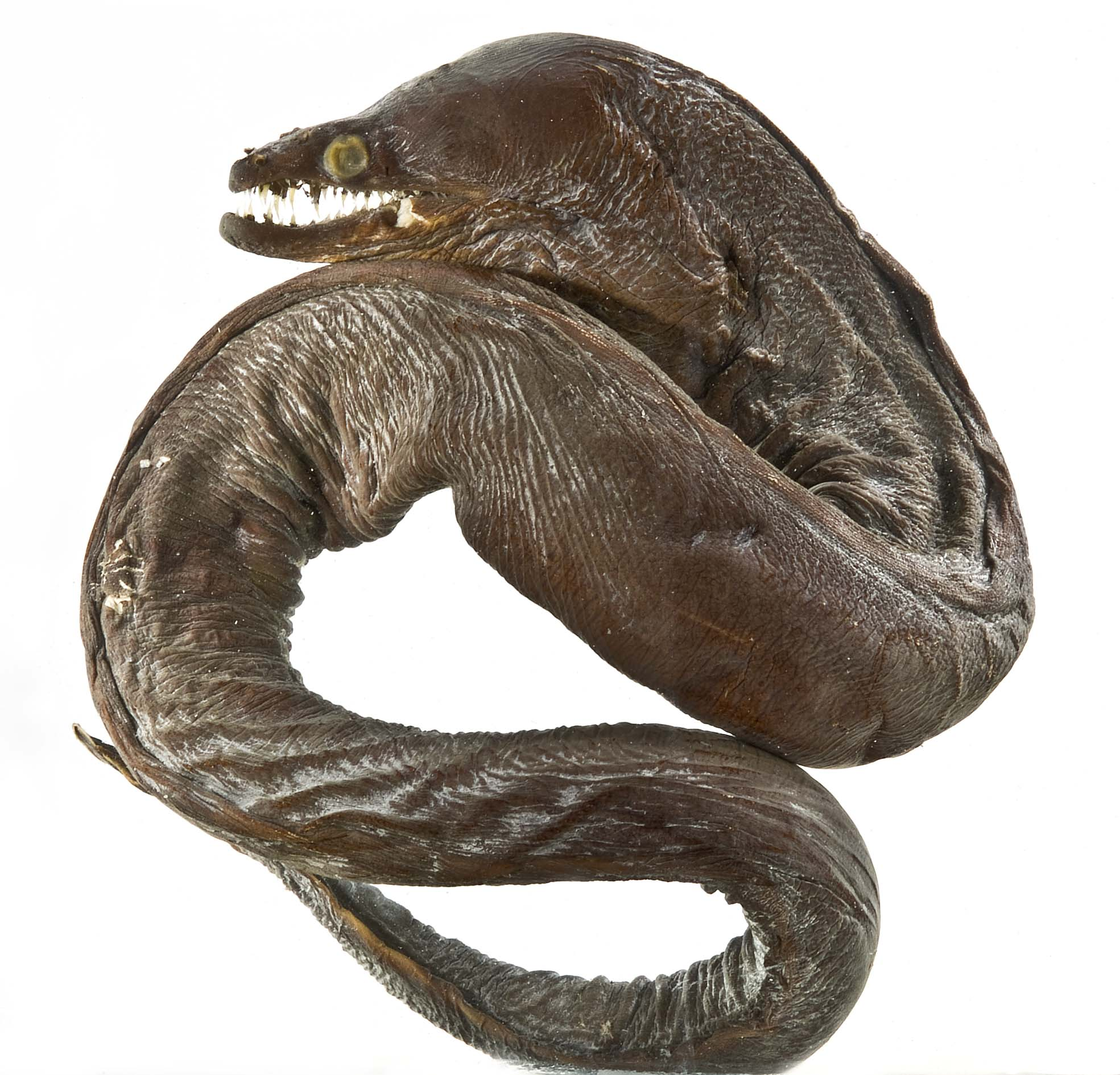

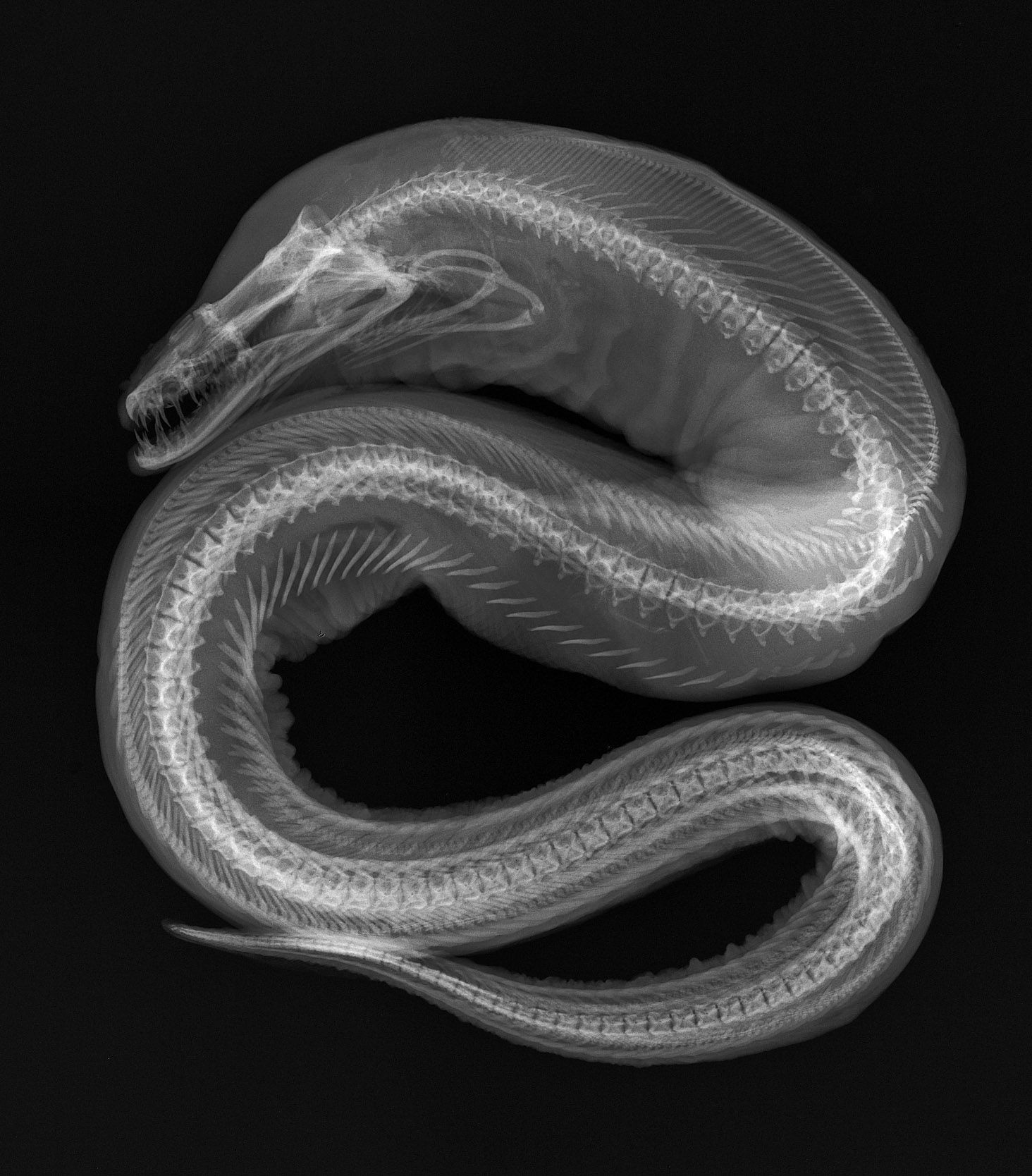
- Viper moray, X-ray image

Conservation status
- Least Concern (IUCN 3.1)

Scientific classification
- Kingdom: Animalia
- Phylum: Chordata
- Class: Actinopterygii
- Order: Anguilliformes
- Family: Muraenidae
- Subfamily: Muraeninae
- Genus: Enchelynassa; Kaup, 1855
- Species: E. canina

Binomial name
- Enchelynassa canina (Quoy & Gaimard, 1824)

Synonyms
- Enchelynassa bleekeri Kaup, 1855; Gymnothorax feyhonnieni J. T. F. Chen, 1929; Gymnothorax vinolentus D. S. Jordan & Evermann, 1903

= Viper moray =

Species of fish

The viper moray (Enchelynassa canina) is a species of saltwater eel, the only member of the genus Enchelynassa of the family Muraenidae. It is found in the Indo-Pacific oceans.

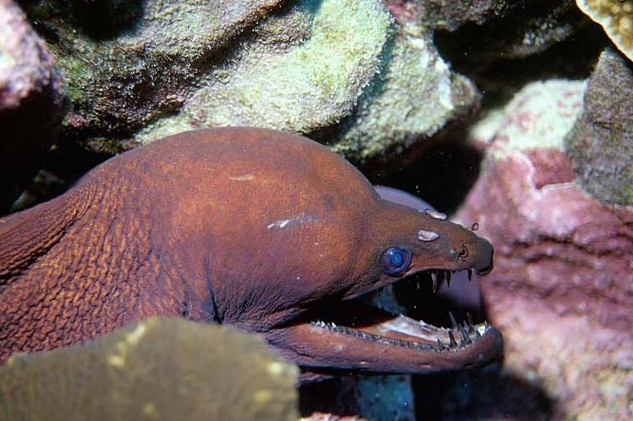
Viper moray, Clipperton Island

== Description ==
The viper moray can grow up to 250 cm. Recognized for its elongated body and sharp, fang-like teeth, this eel is a formidable predator in coral reef ecosystems. It has a slender, elongated body with a dark brown or grayish coloration. One of its most distinctive features is its set of large, pointed teeth. The body is long and sturdy, with a tail shorter than the combined length of the head and trunk. It has a wide mouth with curved jaws, and its sharp teeth remain visible even when the mouth is closed. The large, oval-shaped rear nostrils are surrounded by a fleshy rim and positioned in front of the eyes. The front nostrils are tubular, each featuring a bilobed fleshy flap. Its teeth are sharp and fang-like, arranged in two rows along the jaws, with two small conical teeth on the vomer at the roof of the mouth. The dorsal fin begins in front of the gill openings. The body is a nearly uniform dark brown, while the dorsal and anal fins are lighter towards the back.

== Distribution and habitat ==
Viper moray eels are widely distributed across the Indo-Pacific region, inhabiting tropical and subtropical marine environments. Its range extends from the eastern coast of Africa, including the Red Sea, to the central and western Pacific Ocean. It can be found in the waters around the coastlines of India, Indonesia, and Australia. The species is also present in Japan, the Philippines, Papua New Guinea, and various Pacific islands, including Hawaii and French Polynesia.

This species inhabits outer reefs and reef flats, with recorded depths reaching up to 30 meters. It is believed to be nocturnal, hunting for fish and octopuses at night. As a nocturnal predator, E. canina tends to remain hidden during the day and becomes more active at night when hunting. While its population distribution is broad, localized data on its abundance are limited. They are known for hiding in crevices during the day and emerging at night to hunt.

== Diet and hunting behavior ==
The viper moray eel is a carnivorous predator that primarily feeds on fish and octopus. Like other moray eels, E. canina possesses a secondary set of jaws known as pharyngeal jaws, which are located in its throat.
