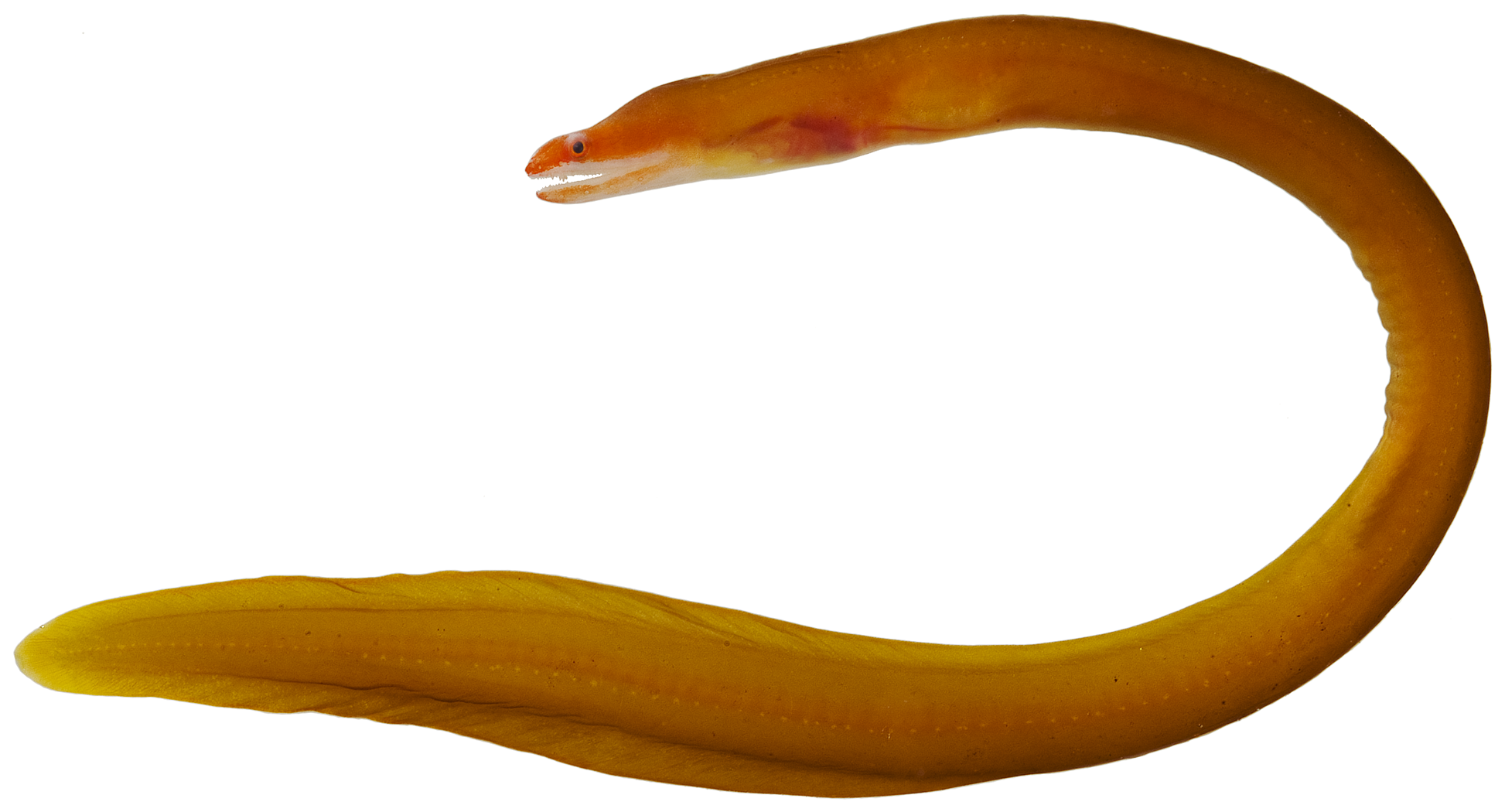
- Monopenchelys acuta

Conservation status
- Least Concern (IUCN 3.1)

Scientific classification
- Kingdom: Animalia
- Phylum: Chordata
- Class: Actinopterygii
- Order: Anguilliformes
- Family: Muraenidae
- Subfamily: Muraeninae
- Genus: Monopenchelys; E. B. Böhlke & McCosker, 1982
- Species: M. acuta

Binomial name
- Monopenchelys acuta (A. E. Parr, 1930)

Synonyms
- Uropterygius acutus Parr, 1930; Rabula acuta (Parr, 1930)

= Monopenchelys =

Redface moray

Genus of fishes

Monopenchelys acuta, the redface moray or redface eel, is a species of saltwater eel, the only member of the genus Monopenchelys of the Muraenidae (Moray eel) family. It is found in the Atlantic, the eastern Pacific, and the western Indian Ocean. Its length is up to 209 mm (8.2 in).
