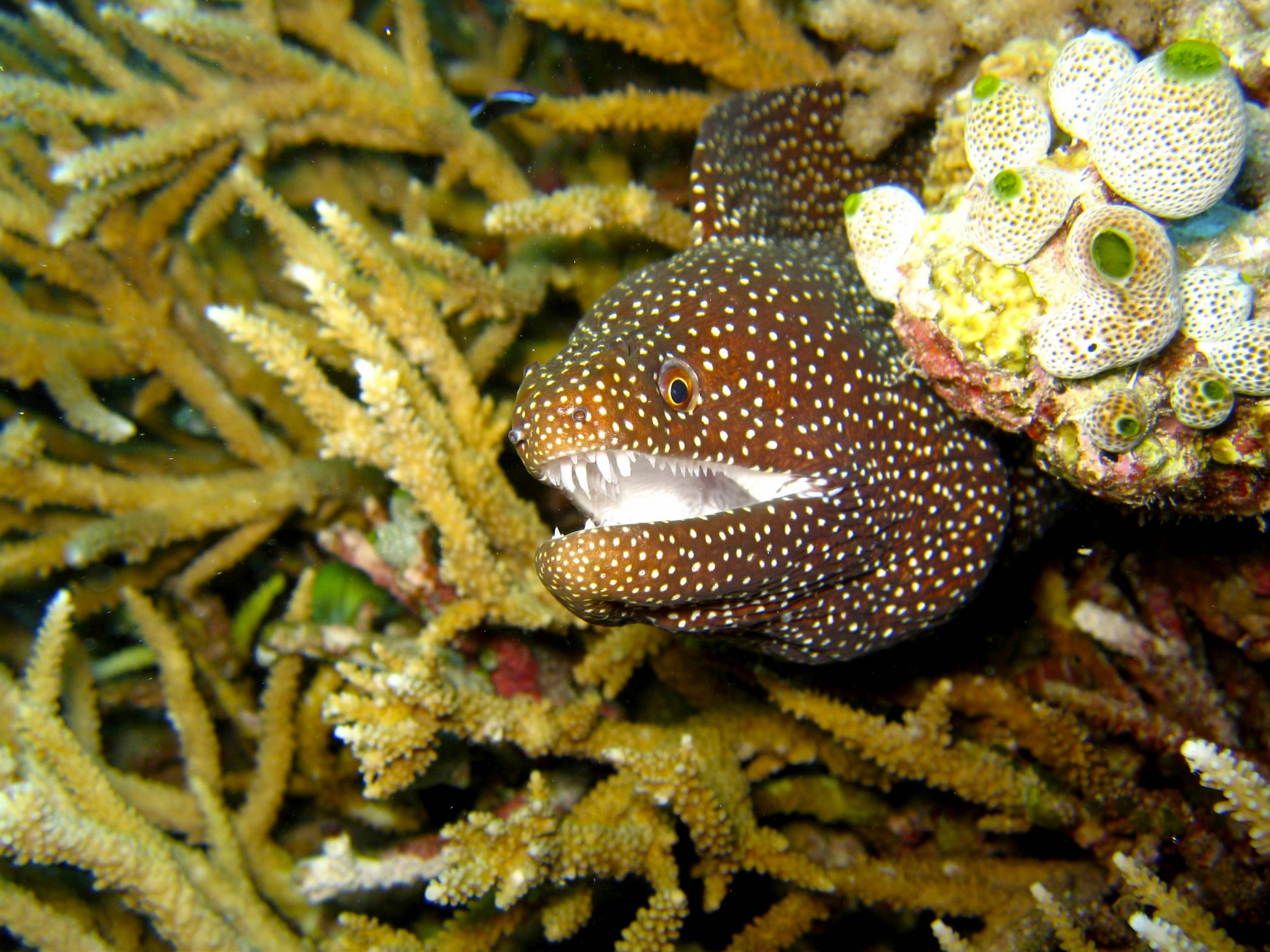
- Whitemouth moray eel in the Maldives

Scientific classification
- Kingdom: Animalia
- Phylum: Chordata
- Class: Actinopterygii
- Division: Teleostei
- Order: Anguilliformes
- Suborder: Muraenoidei
- Family: Muraenidae; Rafinesque, 1810

Subfamiles
- Muraeninae Rafinesque, 1815; Uropterygiinae Fowler, 1925

= Moray eel =

Moray eel Temporal range: Early Eocene– Recent

Family of fishes

Moray eels, or Muraenidae (/ˈmɒreɪ, məˈreɪ/), are a family of eels whose members are found worldwide. There are approximately 200 species in 16 genera which are almost exclusively marine, but several species are regularly seen in brackish water, and a few are found in fresh water.

The English name, moray, dates back to the early 17th century, and is believed to be a derivative from Portuguese moreia, which itself derives from Latin mūrēna, in turn from Greek μύραινα, muraina; these are the Latin and Greek names of the Mediterranean moray.

== Anatomy ==
The dorsal fin extends from just behind the head along the back and joins seamlessly with the caudal and anal fins, with the exception of members of the subfamily Uropterygiinae, which have fins restricted to the tip of the tail. Most species lack pectoral and pelvic fins, contributing to their elongated appearance. Their eyes are relatively small; morays rely mostly on their highly developed sense of smell, while remaining concealed to ambush prey.

The body is generally patterned. In some species, the interior of the mouth is patterned as well. Their jaws are wide, framing a protruding snout. Most possess large teeth suited for tearing flesh or grasping slippery prey. A smaller number of species, for example the snowflake moray (Echidna nebulosa) and zebra moray (Gymnomuraena zebra), primarily feed on crustaceans and other hard-shelled animals, and they have blunt, molar-like teeth suitable for crushing.

Morays secrete a protective mucus over their smooth, scaleless skin, which in some species contains a toxin. They have much thicker skin and high densities of goblet cells in the epidermis that allows mucus to be produced at a higher rate than in other eel species. This allows sand granules to adhere to the sides of their burrows in sand-dwelling morays, thus making the walls of the burrow more permanent due to the glycosylation of mucins in mucus. Placement of their small, circular gills on their flanks, far behind the mouth, requires the moray to maintain a gape / gulping motion to facilitate respiration.

=== Jaw ===
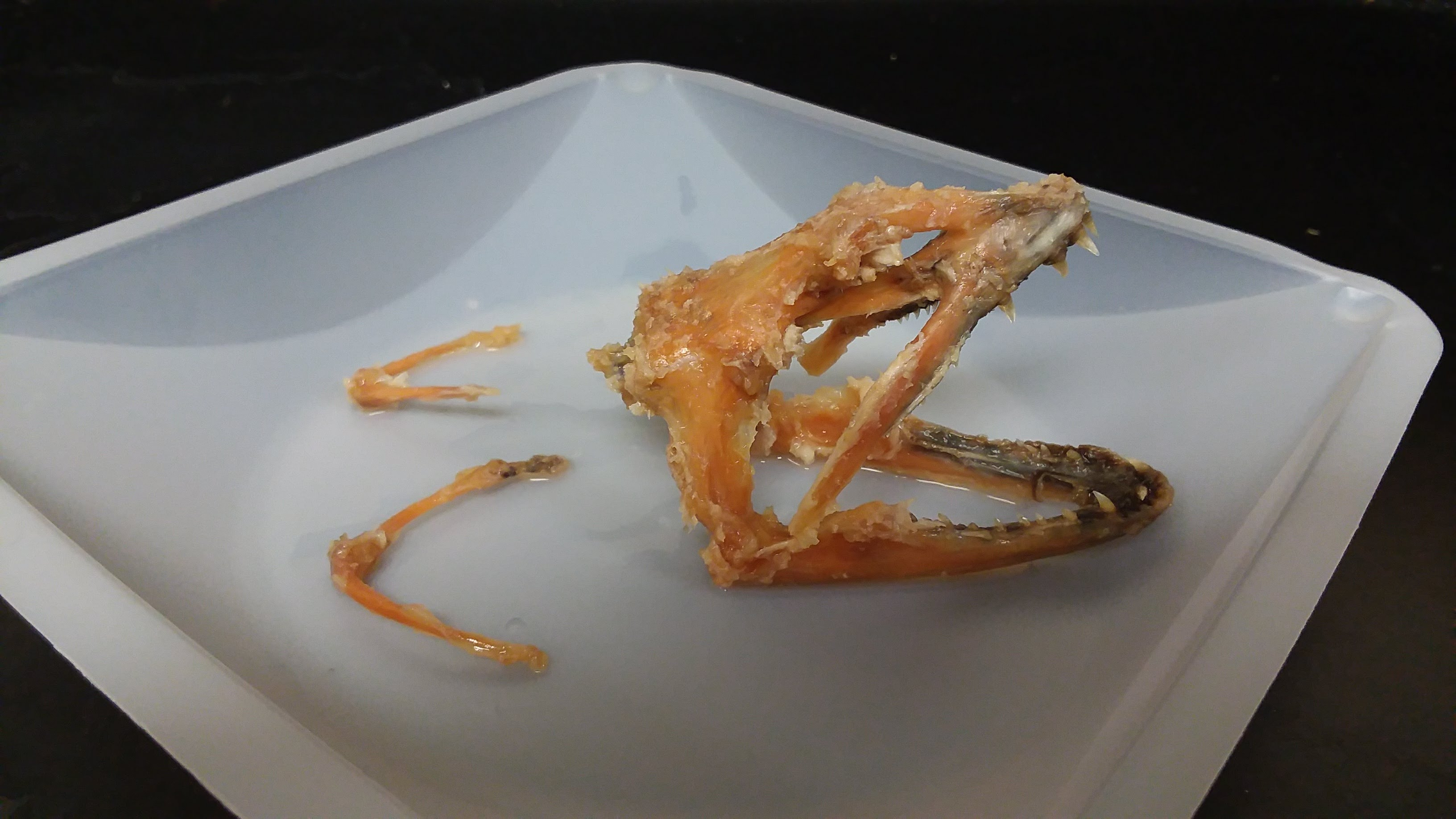
Skull and pharyngeal jaws of a Gymnothorax miliaris (goldentail moray)

The pharyngeal jaws of morays are located farther back in the head and closely resemble the oral jaws (complete with tiny "teeth"). When feeding, morays launch these jaws into the mouth cavity, where they grasp prey and transport it into the throat. Moray eels are the only known animals that use pharyngeal jaws to actively capture and restrain prey in this way.

Moray eel jaw anatomy

In addition to the presence of pharyngeal jaws, morays' mouth openings extend far back into the head, compared to fish which feed using suction. In the action of lunging at prey and biting down, water flows out the posterior side of the mouth opening, reducing waves in front of the eel which would otherwise displace prey. Thus, aggressive predation is still possible even with reduced bite times. In at least one species, the California moray (Gymnothorax mordax), teeth in the roof of the mouth are able to fold down as prey slides backwards, thus preventing the teeth from breaking and maintaining a hold on prey as it is transported to the throat.

Differing shapes of the jaw and teeth reflect the respective diets of different species of moray eel. Evolving separately multiple times within the Muraenidae family, short, rounded jaws and molar-like teeth allow durophagous eels (e.g. zebra moray and genus Echidna) to consume crustaceans, while other piscivorous genera of Muraenidae have pointed jaws and longer teeth. These morphological patterns carry over to teeth positioned on the pharyngeal jaw.

== Feeding behavior ==
Morays are opportunistic, carnivorous predators, and feed primarily on smaller fish, crabs and octopuses. A spotted moray eel has been observed eating a red lionfish without harm. Groupers, barracudas and sea snakes are among their few known predators, making many morays (especially the larger species) apex predators in their ecosystems.

=== Cooperative hunting ===
Reef-associated roving coral groupers (Plectropomus pessuliferus) have been observed recruiting giant morays to help them hunt. The invitation to hunt is initiated by head-shaking. This style of hunting may allow morays to flush prey from niches not accessible to groupers.

== Habitat ==
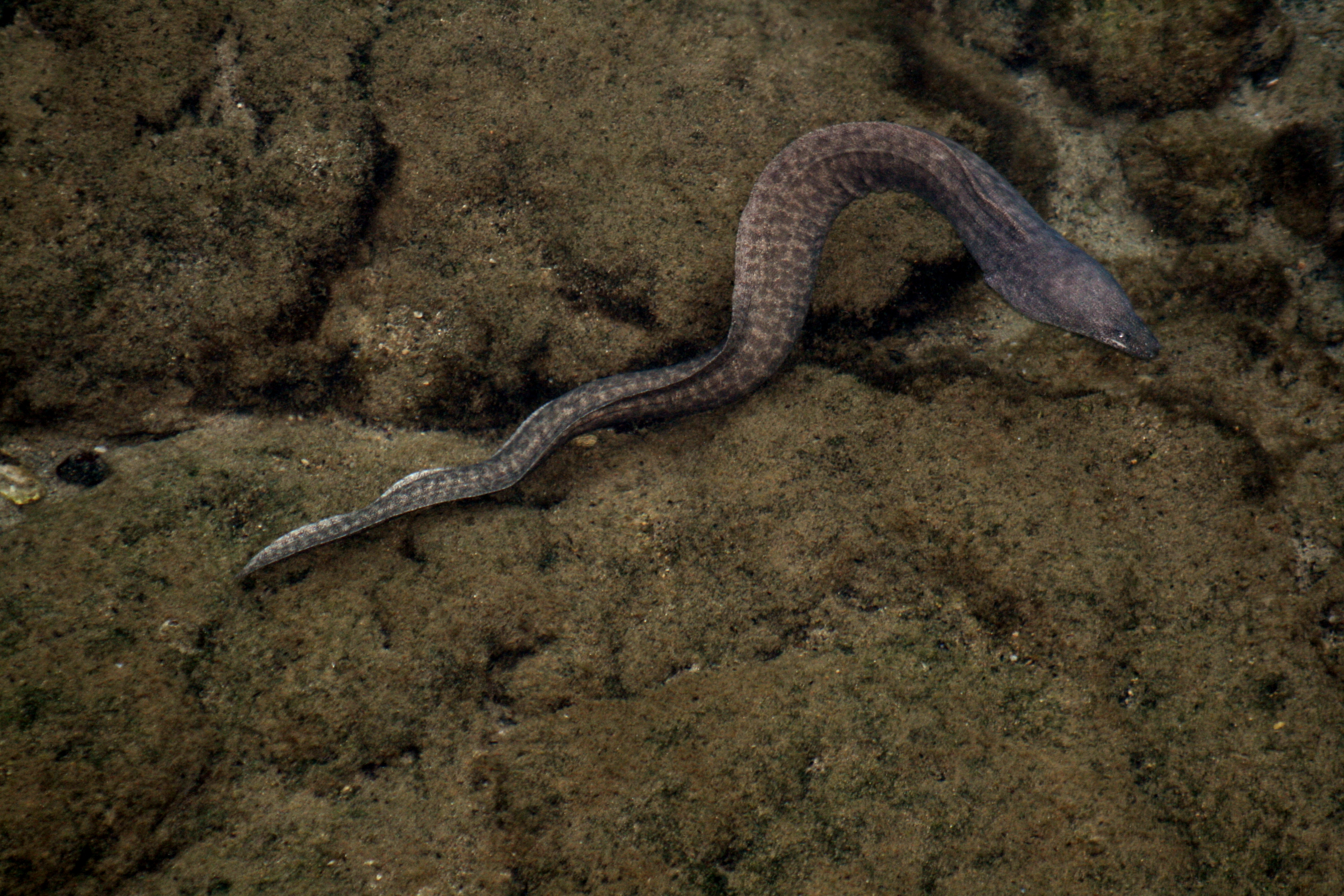
A moray occupying a dead patch reef, located in Kona, Hawaii

The moray eel can be found in both fresh and saltwater habitats. The vast majority of species are strictly marine, never entering freshwater. Of the few species known to live in freshwater, the most well-known is Gymnothorax polyuranodon.

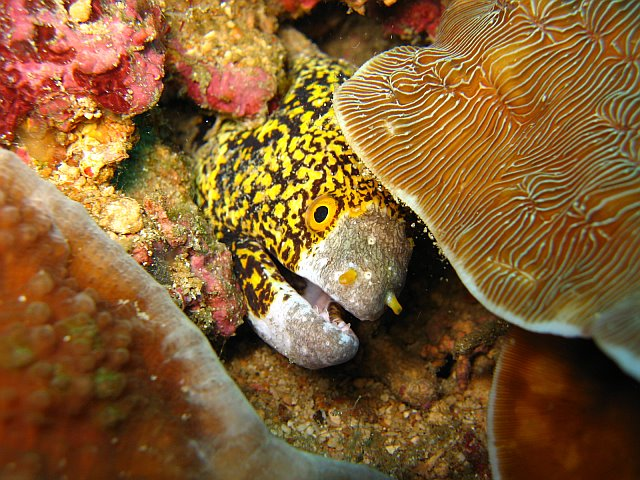
Echidna nebulosa occupying a live coral reef, located in Sabang, Philippines

Within the marine realm, morays are found in shallow water nearshore areas, continental slopes, continental shelves, deep benthic habitats, and mesopelagic zones of the ocean, and in both tropical and temperate environments. Most species are found in tropical or subtropical environments, with only a few species (yellow moray) found in temperate ocean environments.

Although the moray eel can occupy both tropical oceans and temperate oceans, as well as both freshwater and saltwater, the majority of moray eels occupy warm saltwater environments, which contain reefs. Within the tropical oceans and temperate oceans, the moray eel occupies shelters, such as dead patch reefs and coral rubble rocks, and less frequently occupies live coral reefs.

== Reproduction and lifecycle ==
The reproductive biology of moray eels remains incompletely understood. Most species are oviparous, with external fertilization occurring in the water column. During spawning, both males and females release gametes simultaneously, and the fertilized eggs are subsequently dispersed by ocean currents.

Following fertilization, the eggs develop into leptocephalus larvae, which are transparent and ribbon-like in appearance. These larvae remain in the pelagic zone for extended periods—often up to a year—feeding on microscopic plankton. This prolonged larval phase facilitates wide geographic dispersal prior to settlement in benthic habitats such as coral reefs or rocky substrates, where metamorphosis into juvenile eels occurs.

The transition from larva to juvenile involves significant morphological and behavioral changes, including the development of adult pigmentation, body form, and ecological habits. Juvenile moray eels typically adopt the solitary and territorial behavior characteristic of adults.

Due to their nocturnal activity and the often inaccessible environments in which reproduction occurs, direct observations of moray eel courtship and spawning behavior are rare. Consequently, their reproductive mechanisms remain one of the least documented aspects of their biology.

Environmental factors such as water temperature, photoperiod, and food availability are believed to influence spawning events. Breeding in captivity is infrequent, which further limits opportunities for scientific study of their reproductive cycle.

== Taxonomy ==
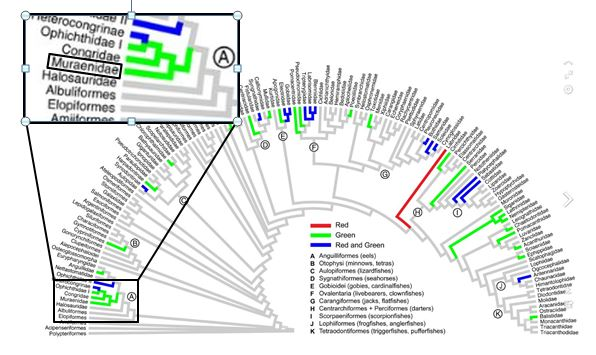
Muranidae represented on a phylogenetic tree

=== Genera ===
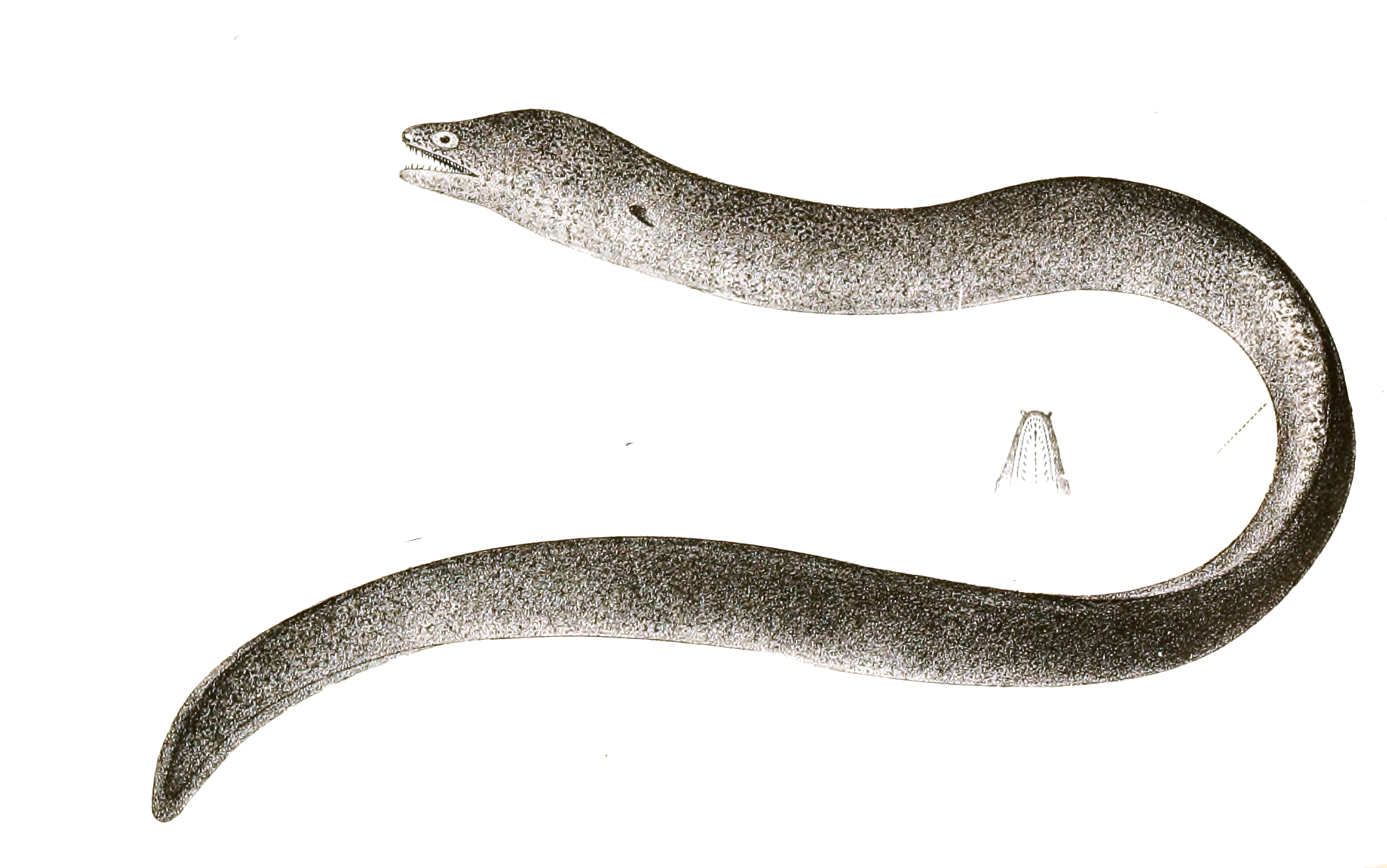
A representative structure of the subfamily Uropterygiinae

There are over 200 known species of moray eels, in 16 genera. These genera are in two sub-families, Muraeninae and Uropterygiinae, which are distinguished by the location of their fins. In Muraeninae the dorsal fin is near the gill slits and runs down the back of the eel, and the anal fin is behind the anus. In Uropterygiinae, both the dorsal and the anal fin are at the end of the tail. Though this distinction can be seen between the two sub-families, there are still many varieties of genera within Muraeninae and Uropterygiinae. Of these, the genus Gymnothorax is by far the broadest, including more than half of the total number of species.

The family Muraenidae comprises the following subfamiles and genera:

- †Eomuraena Casier, 1967 (fossil; Early Eocene of Germany)
- Subfamily Muraeninae Rafinesque, 1815
  - Diaphenchelys McCosker & Randall, 2007
  - Echidna Forster, 1788
  - Enchelycore Kaup, 1856
  - Enchelynassa Kaup, 1855
  - Gymnomuraena Lacépède, 1803
  - Gymnothorax Bloch, 1795
  - Monopenchelys Böhlke & McCosker, 1982
  - Muraena Linnaeus, 1758
  - Pseudechidna Bleeker, 1863
  - Rhinomuraena Garman, 1888
  - Strophidon McClelland, 1844
- Subfamily Uropterygiinae Fowler 1925
  - Anarchias D. S. Jordan & Starks, 1906
  - Channomuraena Richardson, 1848
  - Cirrimaxilla H.-M. Chen & K.-T .Shao, 1995
  - Scuticaria D. S. Jordan & Snyder, 1901
  - Uropterygius Rüppell, 1838
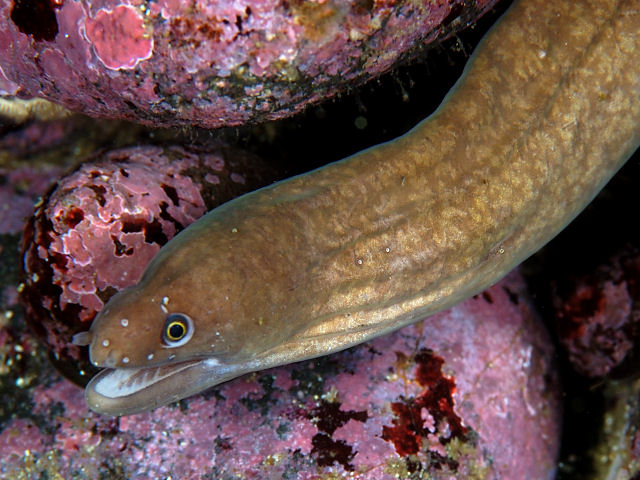
Anarchias seychellensis

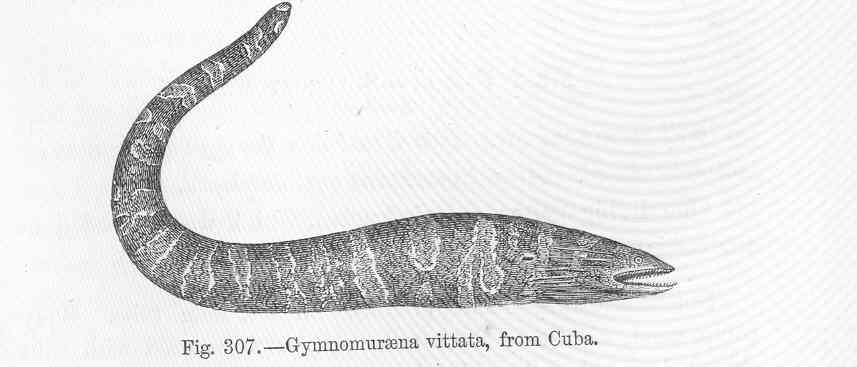
Channomuraena vittata

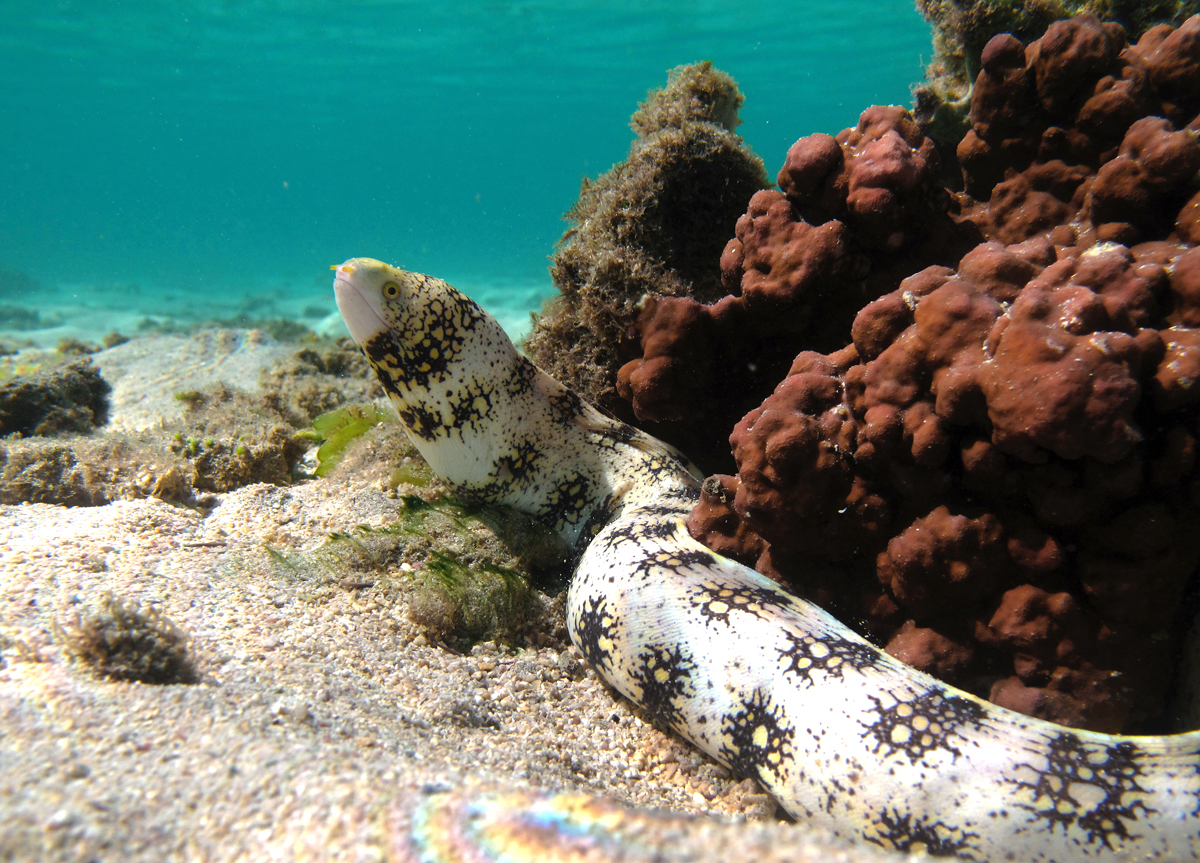
Snowflake moray (Echidna nebulosa)

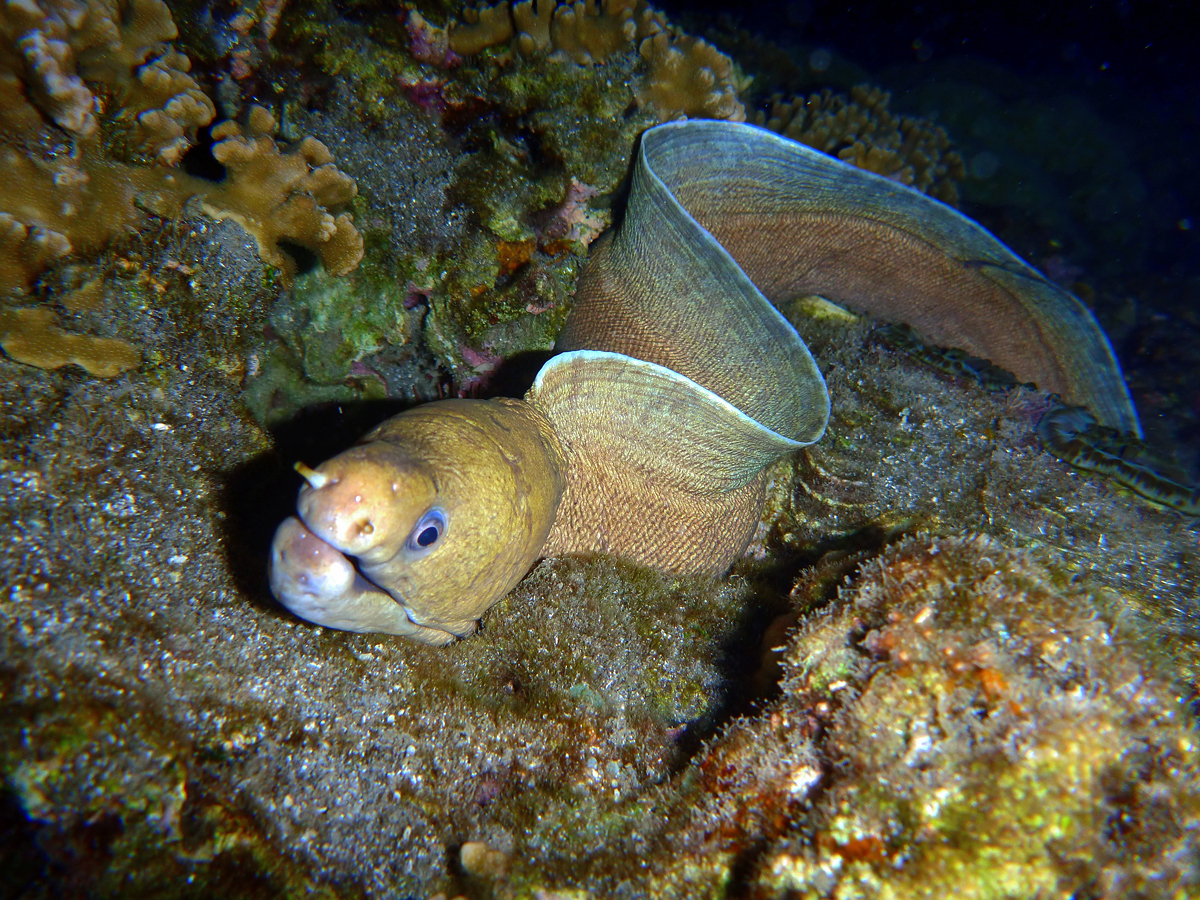
Barred moray (Echidna polyzona)

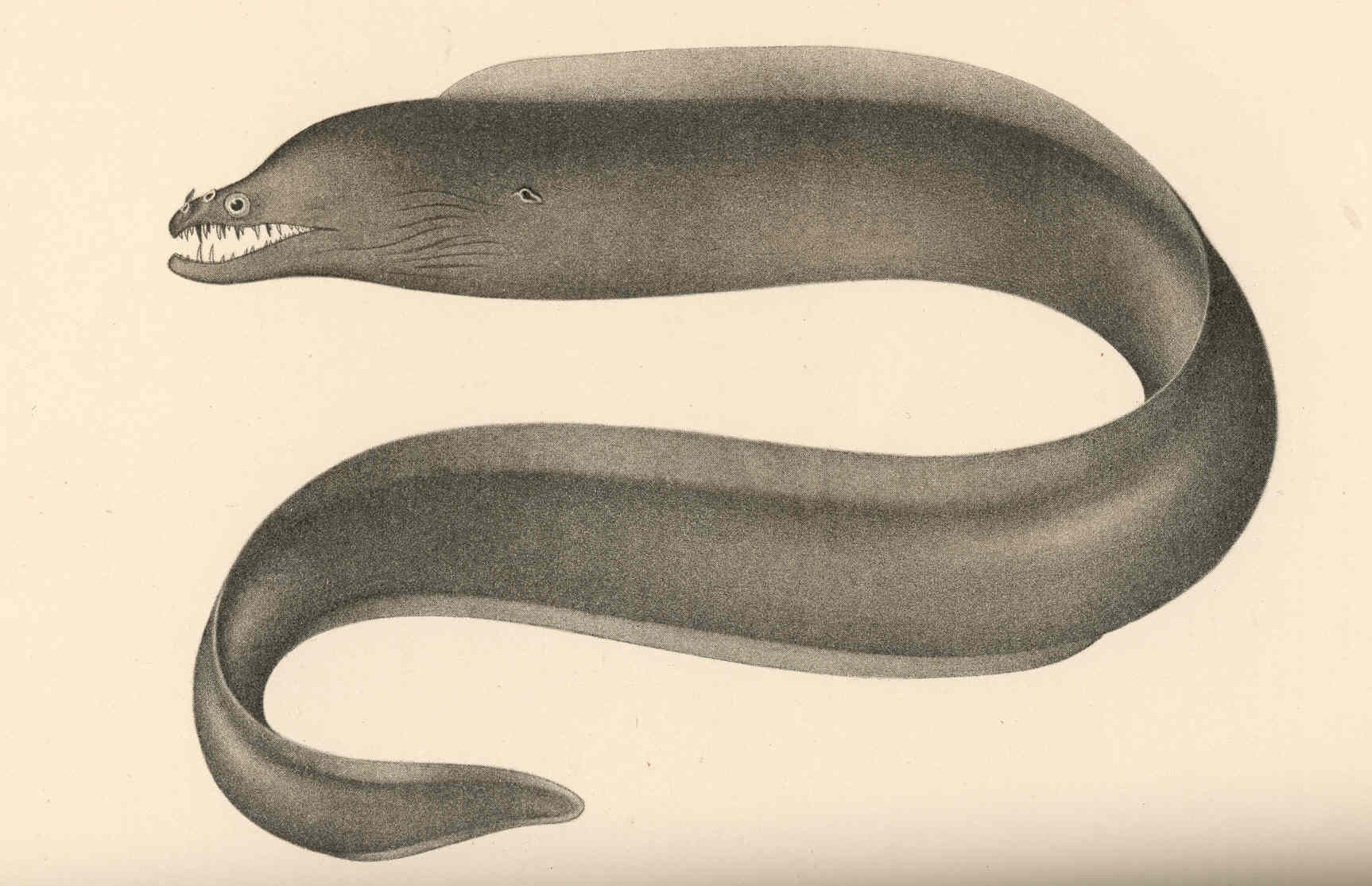
Viper moray (Enchelynassa canina)

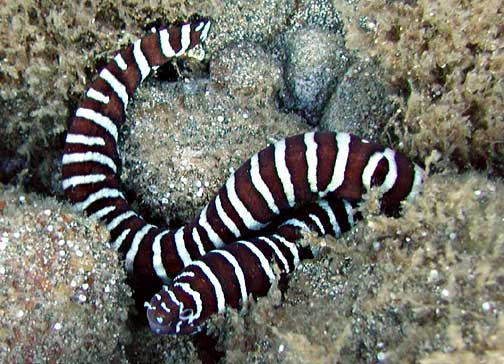
Zebra moray (Gymnomuraena zebra)

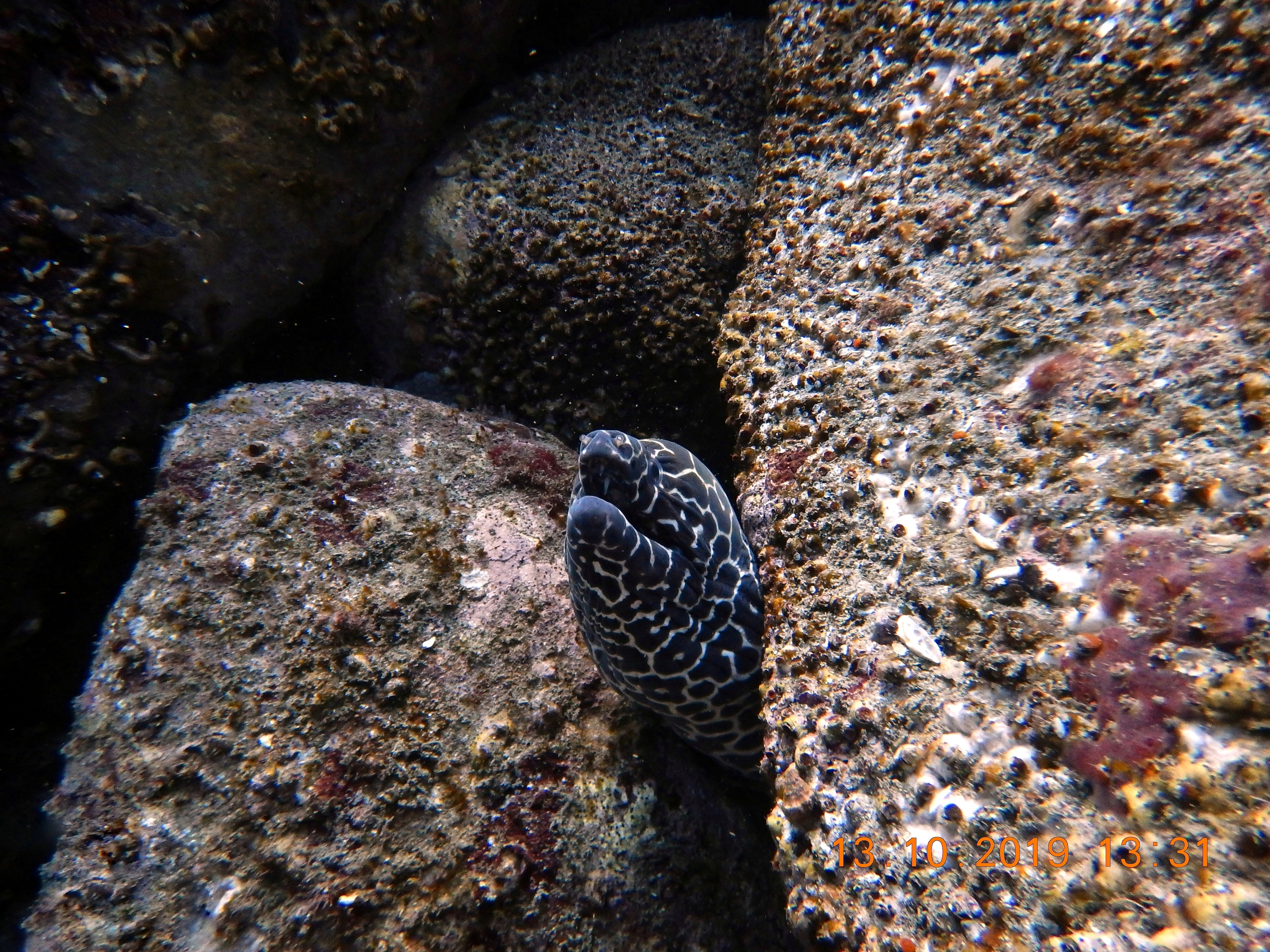
Laced moray (Gymnothorax favagineus)

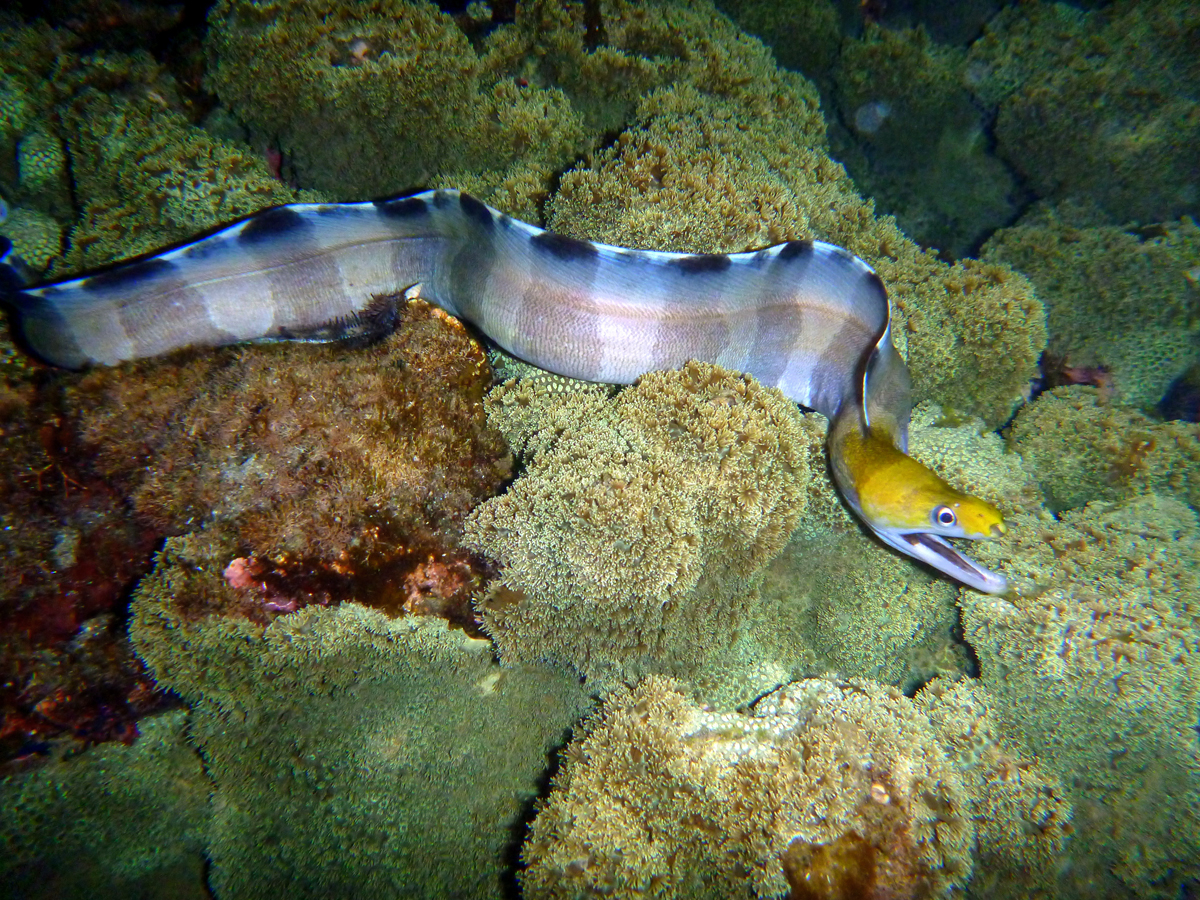
Gymnothorax rueppelliae

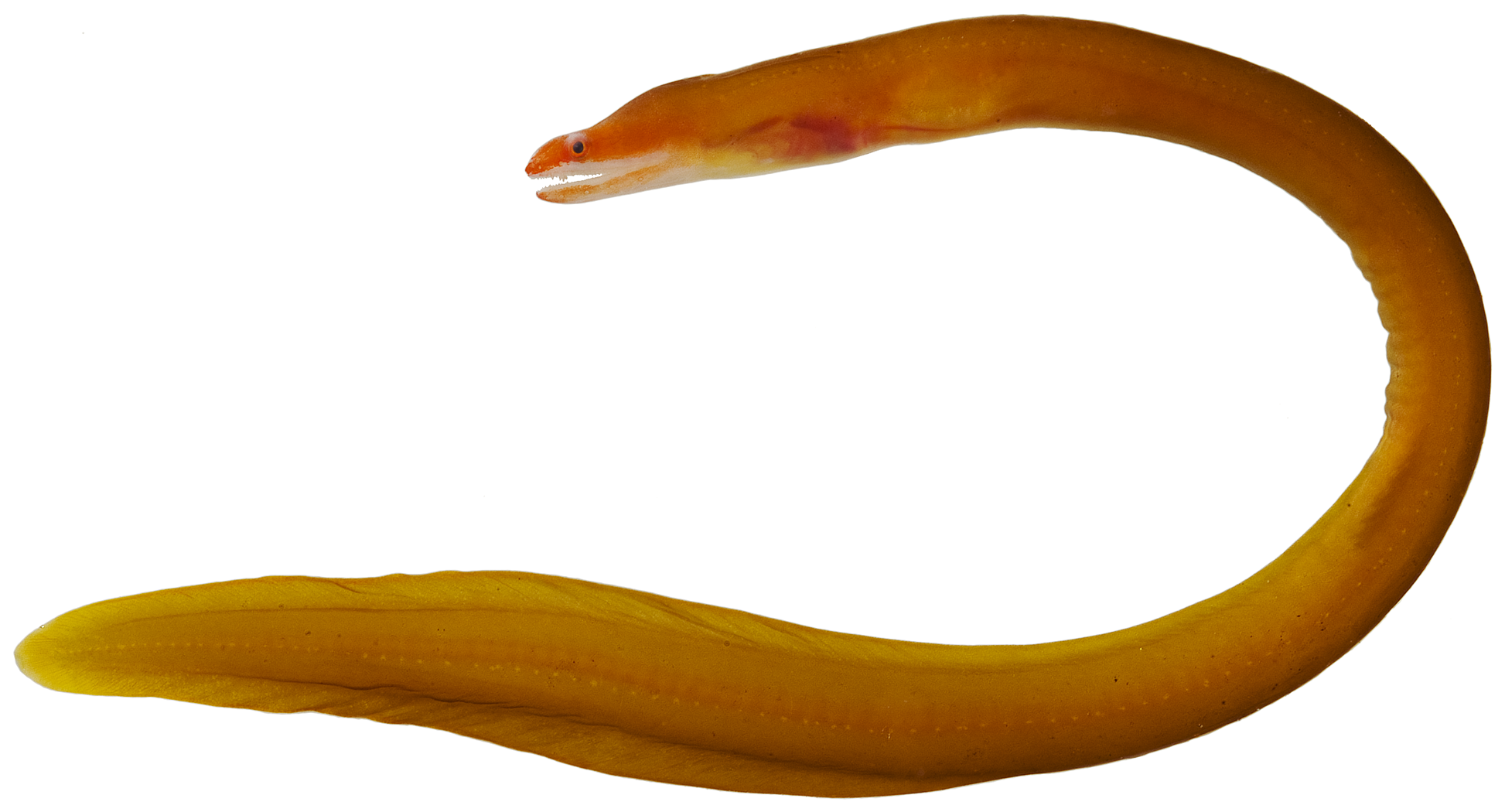
Monopenchelys acuta

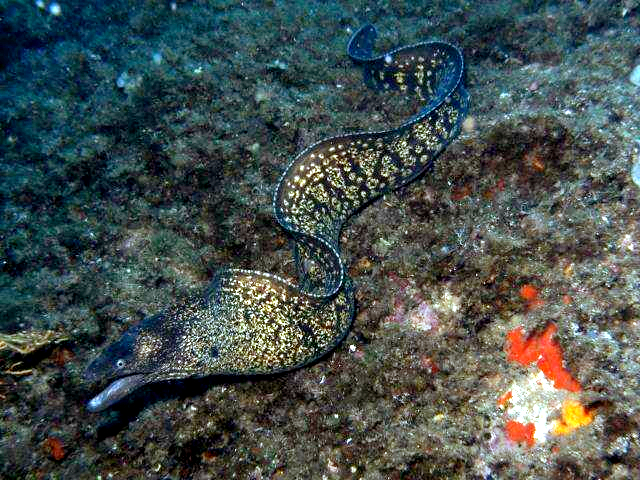
Mediterranean moray (Muraena helena)

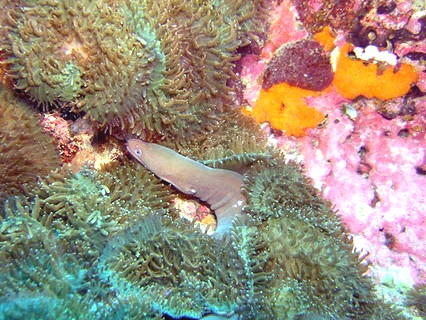
White ribbon eel (Pseudechidna brummeri)

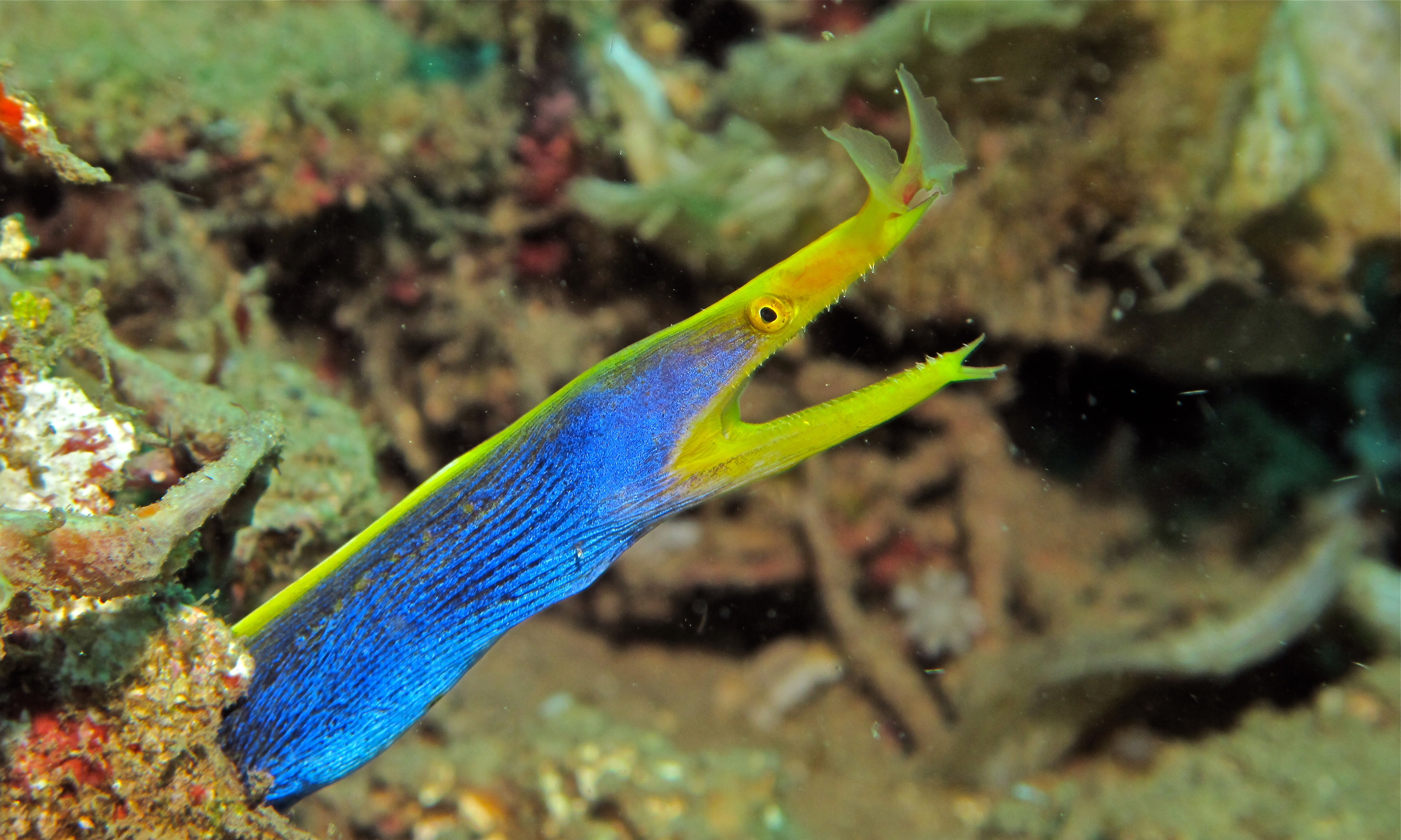
Ribbon eel (Rhinomuraena quaesita)

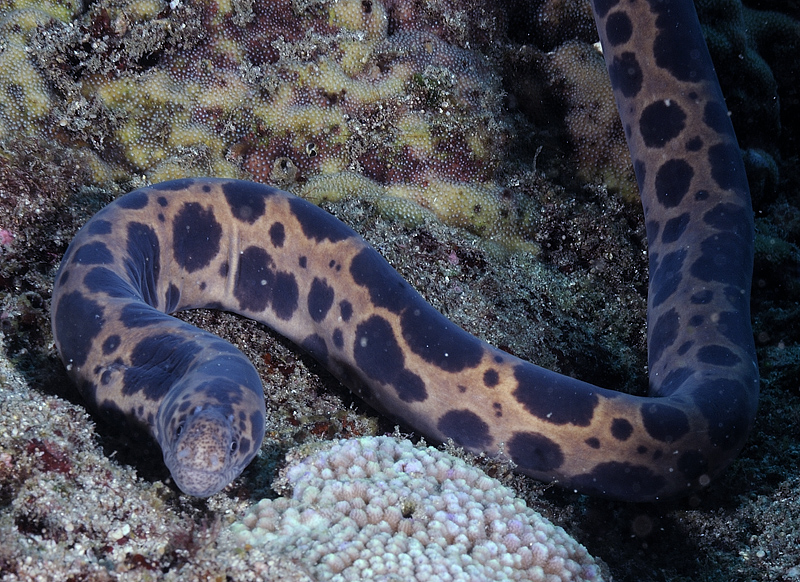
Scuticaria tigrina

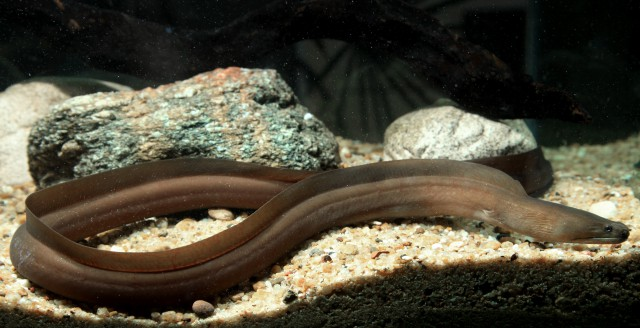
Slender giant moray (Strophidon sathete)

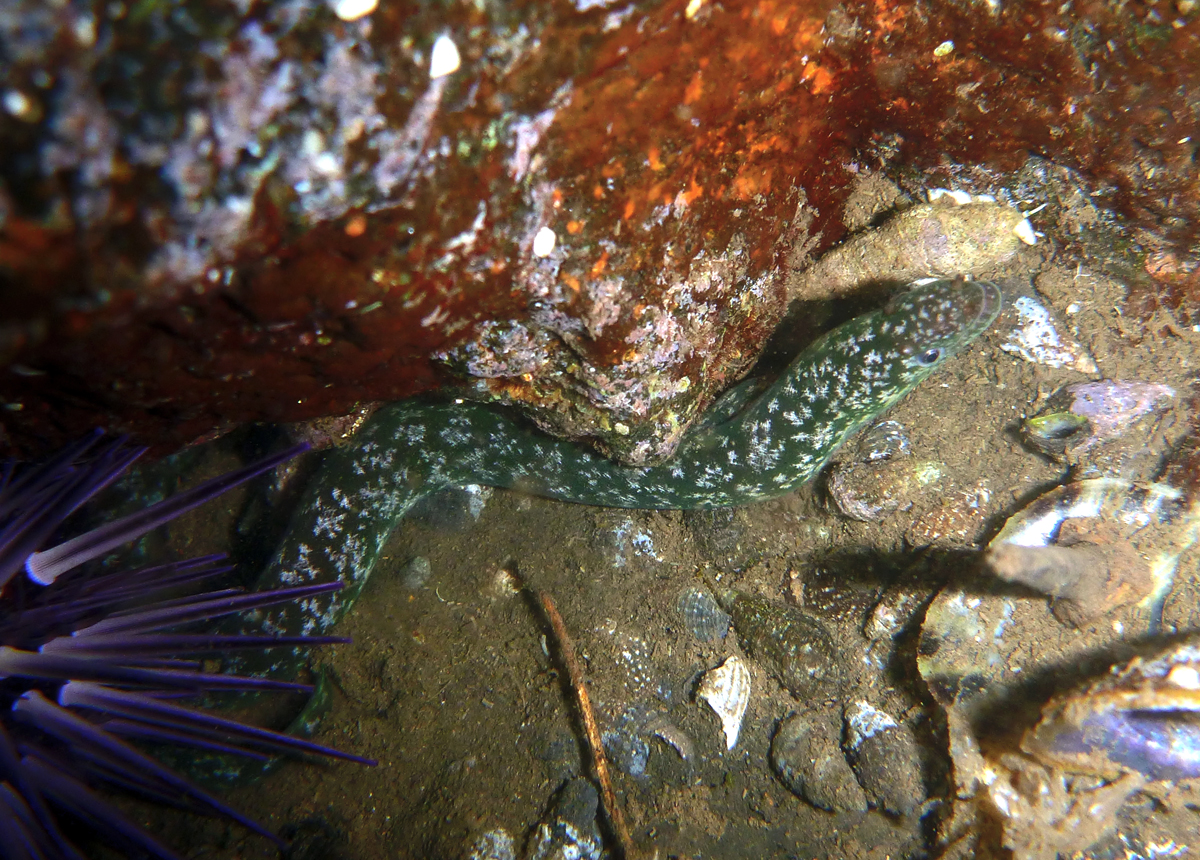
Uropterygius xanthopterus

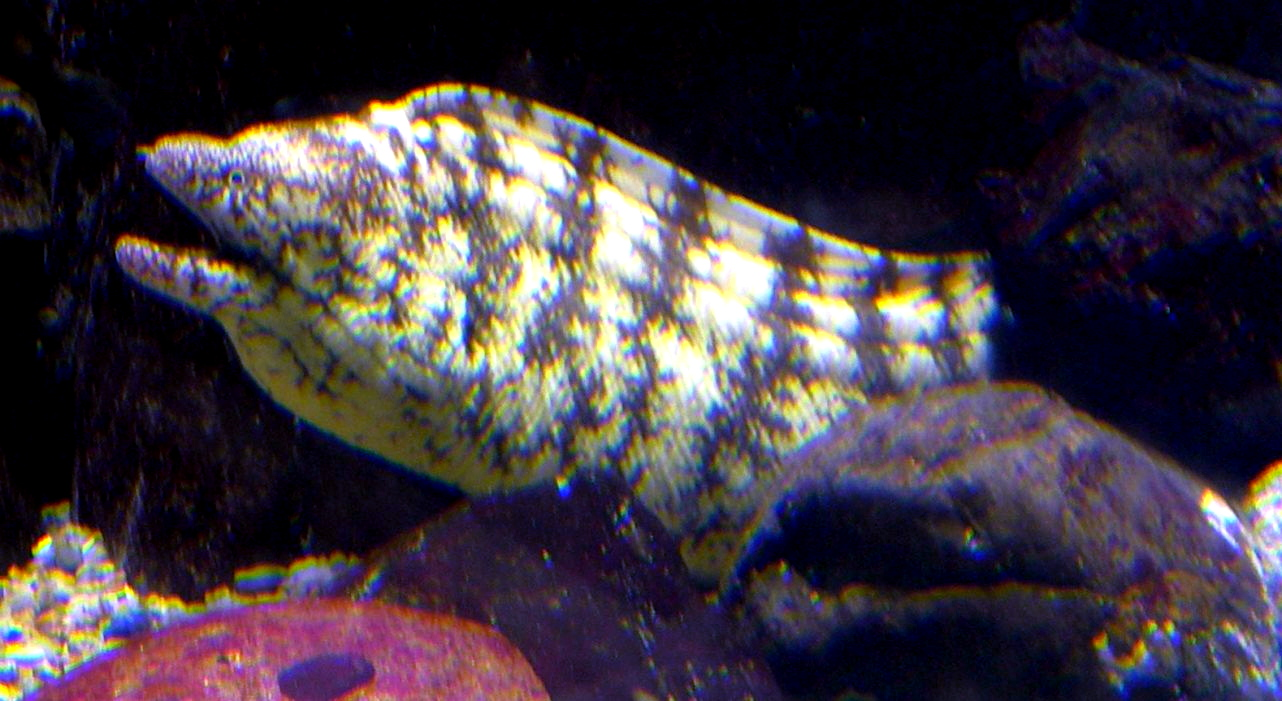
Kidako moray (Gymnothorax kidako)

== Evolution ==
The moray eel's elongation is due to an increase in the number of vertebrae, rather than a lengthening of each individual vertebra or a substantial decrease in body depth. Vertebrae have been added asynchronously between the pre-tail ("precaudal") and tail ("caudal") regions, unlike other groups of eels such as Ophicthids and Congrids.

== Relationship with humans ==
=== Aquarium trade ===
Several moray species are popular among aquarium hobbyists for their hardiness, flexible diets, and disease resistance. The most commonly traded species are the snowflake, zebra and goldentail moray (Gymnothorax miliaris). Several other species are occasionally seen, but are more difficult to obtain and can command a steep price on the market.

=== Food poisoning ===
Moray eels, particularly the giant moray (Gymnothorax javanicus) and yellow-edged moray (G. flavimarginatus), are known to accumulate high levels of ciguatoxins, unlike other reef fish; if consumed by humans, ciguatera fish poisoning may result. Ciguatera is characterised by neurological, gastrointestinal, and cardiovascular problems that may persist for days after eating tainted fish. In morays, the toxins are most concentrated in the liver. In an especially remarkable instance, 57 people in the Northern Mariana Islands were poisoned after eating just the head and half of a cooked yellow-edged moray. Thus, morays are not recommended for human consumption.
