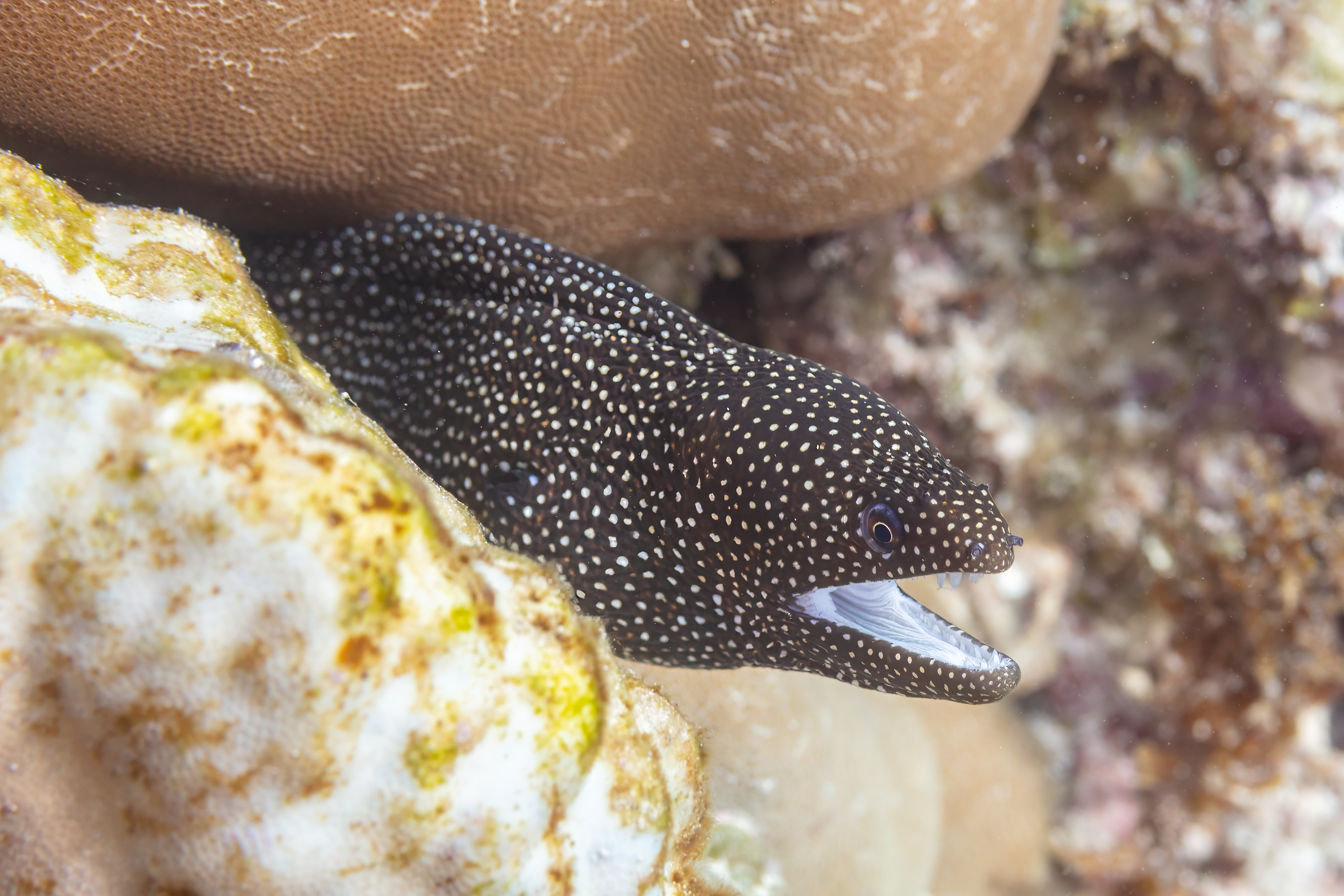

Conservation status
- Least Concern (IUCN 3.1)

Scientific classification
- Kingdom: Animalia
- Phylum: Chordata
- Class: Actinopterygii
- Division: Teleostei
- Order: Anguilliformes
- Family: Muraenidae
- Genus: Gymnothorax
- Species: G. meleagris

Binomial name
- Gymnothorax meleagris (G. Shaw, 1795)

= Turkey moray =

Species of fish

The turkey moray (Gymnothorax meleagris), also known as the guineafowl moray or the white-mouth/whitemouth moray, is a species of marine fish in the family Muraenidae.

== Description ==
The turkey moray is a medium size moray which can reach a maximum length of 120 cm, but are typically much smaller. Its body is serpentine in shape and has a dark brown to black background color dotted with numerous small, uniformly distributed white spots. The inside of its mouth is completely white.

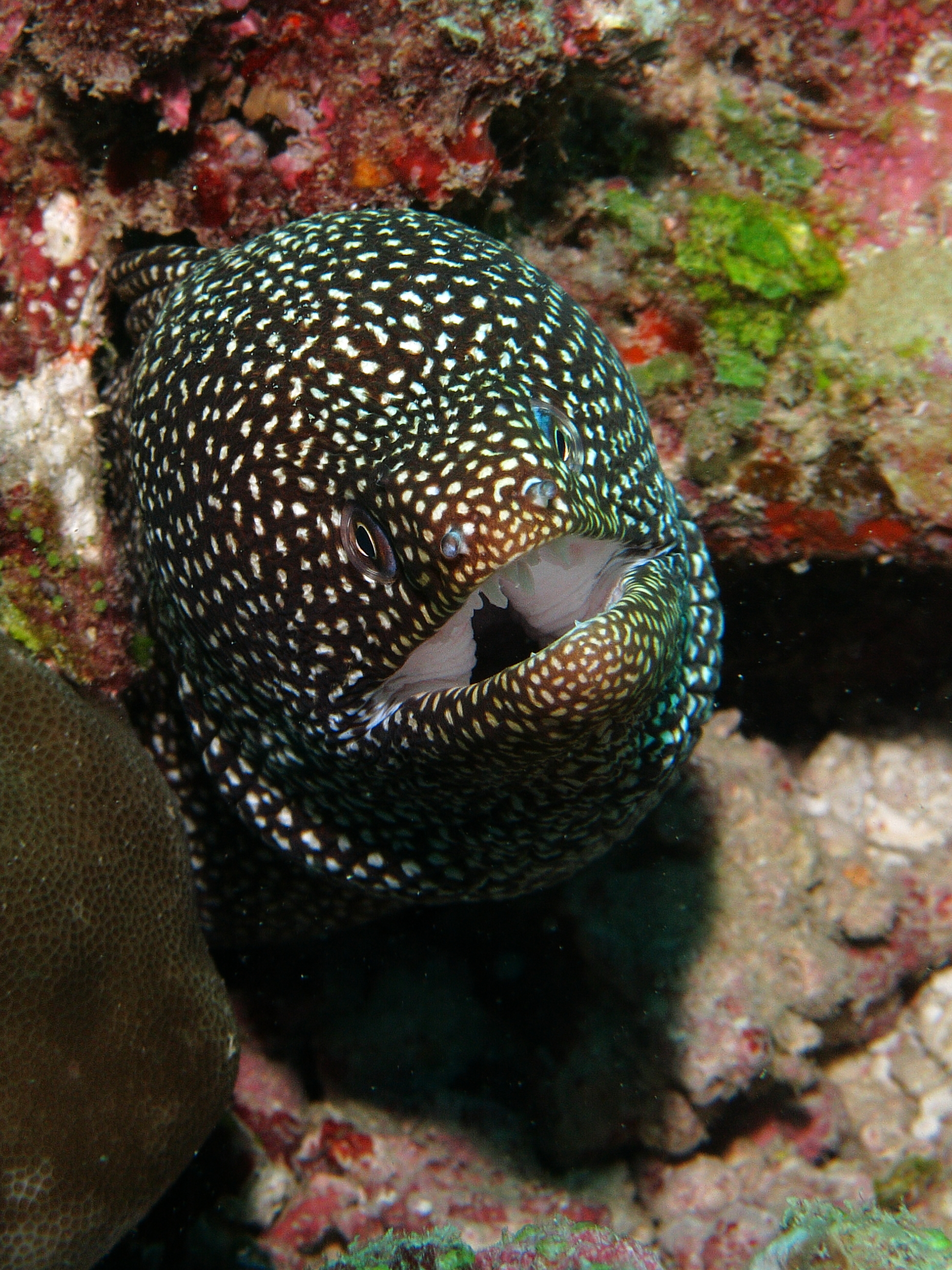

== Distribution and habitat ==
The turkey moray is widespread throughout the Indo-Pacific area from the eastern coast of Africa (Red Sea included) to Polynesia and Hawaii and from south Japan to New Caledonia. This is a relatively rare moray, even within its distribution area, except in Hawaii, where it seems to be common.

It likes shallow waters such as lagoons and reefs rich in coral and fish life, up to 36 meters (118 feet) deep, spending time in holes in the reef from which it can quickly emerge and ambush and capture passing fish. The moray senses prey by picking up its scent through the water.

== Biology ==
The turkey moray seems to be equally active day and night and feeds on small fish and occasionally crustaceans.
