= Piscivore =

Organism that eats mostly or exclusively fish tissue

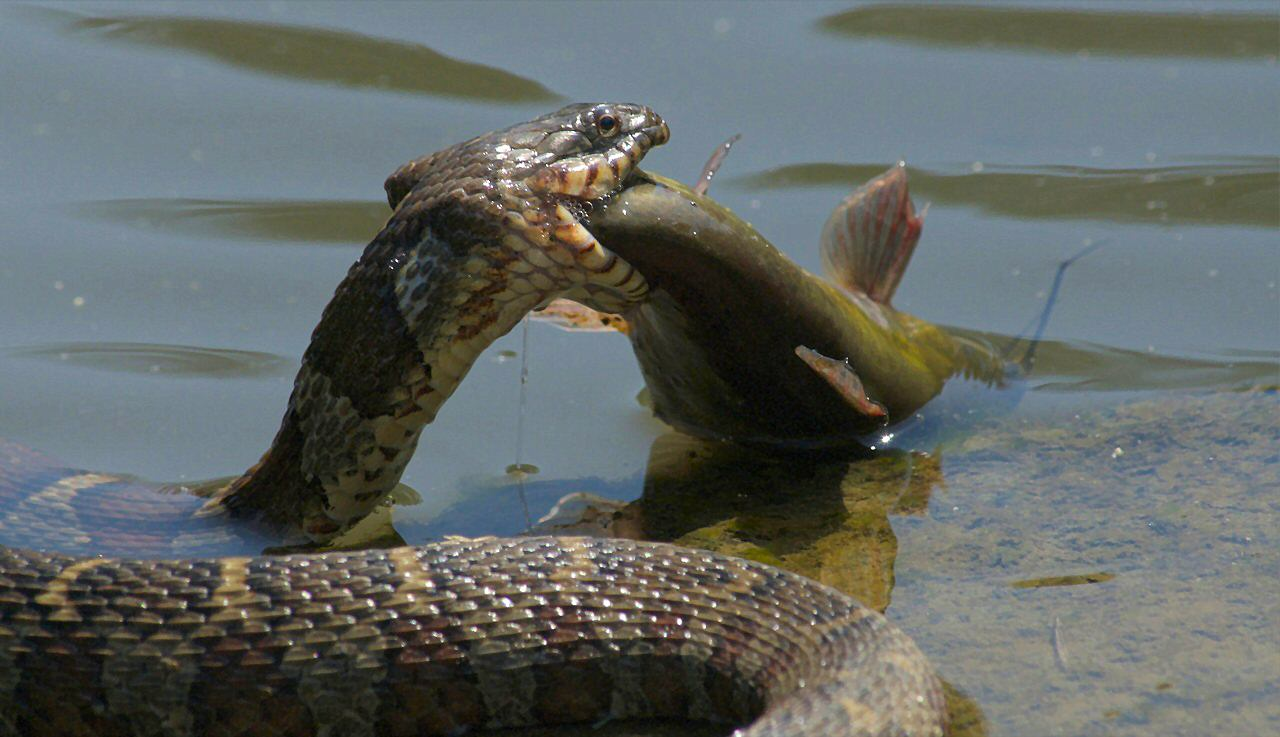
Northern water snake (Nerodia sipedon) eating a catfish

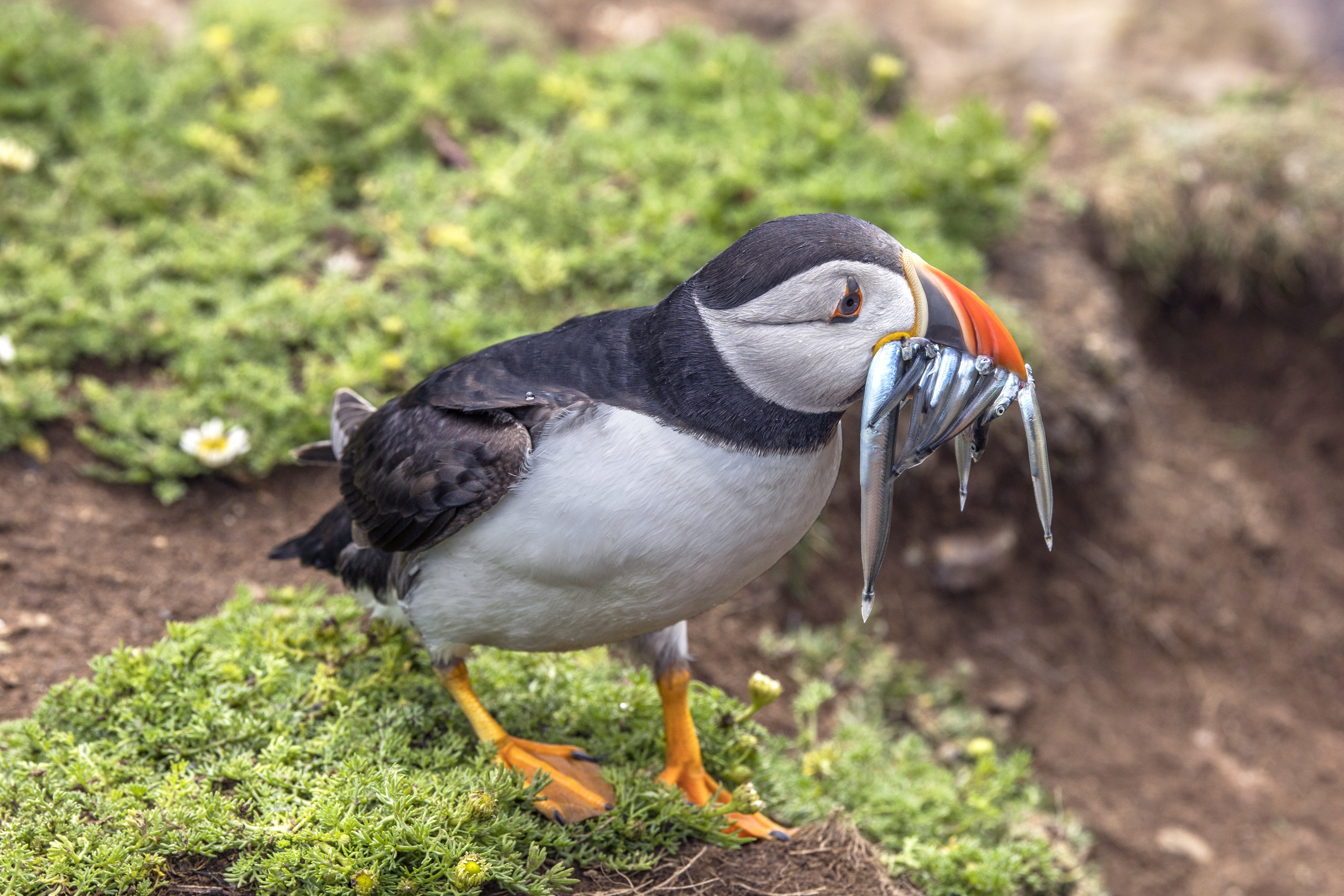
An Atlantic puffin with a mouth full of lesser sand eels

A piscivore (/ˈpɪsɪvɔːr/) is a carnivorous animal that primarily eats fish. Fish were the diet of early tetrapod evolution (via water-bound amphibians during the Devonian period); insectivory came next; then in time, the more terrestrially adapted reptiles and synapsids evolved herbivory.

Almost all predatory fish (most sharks, tuna, billfishes, pikes etc.) are obligated piscivores. Some non-piscine aquatic animals, such as whales, sea lions, and crocodilians, are not completely piscivorous; often also preying on invertebrates, marine mammals, waterbirds and even wading land animals in addition to fish, while others, such as the bulldog bat and gharial, are strictly dependent on fish for food. Some creatures, including cnidarians, octopuses, squid, cetaceans, spiders, grizzly bears, jaguars, wolves, snakes, turtles and sea gulls, may have fish as significant if not dominant portions of their diets. Humans can live on fish-based diets, as can their carnivorous domesticated pets such as dogs and cats.

== Etymology ==
The name piscivore is derived from Latin piscis 'fish' and vorō 'to devour'. Piscivore is equivalent to the Greek-derived word ichthyophage, both of which mean "fish eater".

== Discussion ==
The ecological effects of piscivores can extend to other food chains. In a study of cutthroat trout stocking, researchers found that the addition of this piscivore can have noticeable effects on non-aquatic organisms, in this case bats feeding on insects emerging from the water with the trout. Another study done on lionfish removal to maintain low densities used piscivore densities as a biological indicator for coral reef success.

There exist classifications of primary and secondary piscivores. Primary piscivores, also known as "specialists", shift to this habit in the first few months of their lives. Secondary piscivores will move to eating primarily fish later in their lifetime. It is hypothesized that the secondary piscivores' diet change is due to an adaptation to maintain efficiency in their use of energy while growing.

== Examples of extant piscivores ==
=== Arachnids ===
- Fishing spider

=== Birds ===
- Bald eagle
- Merganser
- Osprey
- Penguin

=== Fish ===
- African tigerfish
- Alligator gar
- Arapaima
- Barracuda
- Bluefish
- Giant trevally
- Kidako moray
- Lemon shark
- Lionfish
- Piranha
- Silver arowana

=== Mammals ===
- Amazon river dolphin
- American mink
- Aquatic genet
- Bottlenose dolphin
- Bulldog bat
- Eurasian otter
- Fish-eating bat
- Fishing cat
- Flat-headed cat
- Fur seal
- Giant otter
- Harbor seal
- North American river otter
- Orca
- Otter shrew
- Sea lion
- Tiger

=== Reptiles ===
- Asian water monitor
- Gharial
- Green anaconda
- Komodo dragon
- Yellow anaconda
- Yellow-bellied sea snake

== Extinct and prehistoric piscivores ==
Numerous extinct and prehistoric animals are hypothesized to have been primarily piscivorous due to anatomy and/or ecology. Furthermore, some have been confirmed to be piscivorous through fossil evidence. This list includes specialist piscivores, such as Laganosuchus, as well as generalist predators, such as Baryonyx and Spinosaurus, found to have or assumed to have eaten fish:

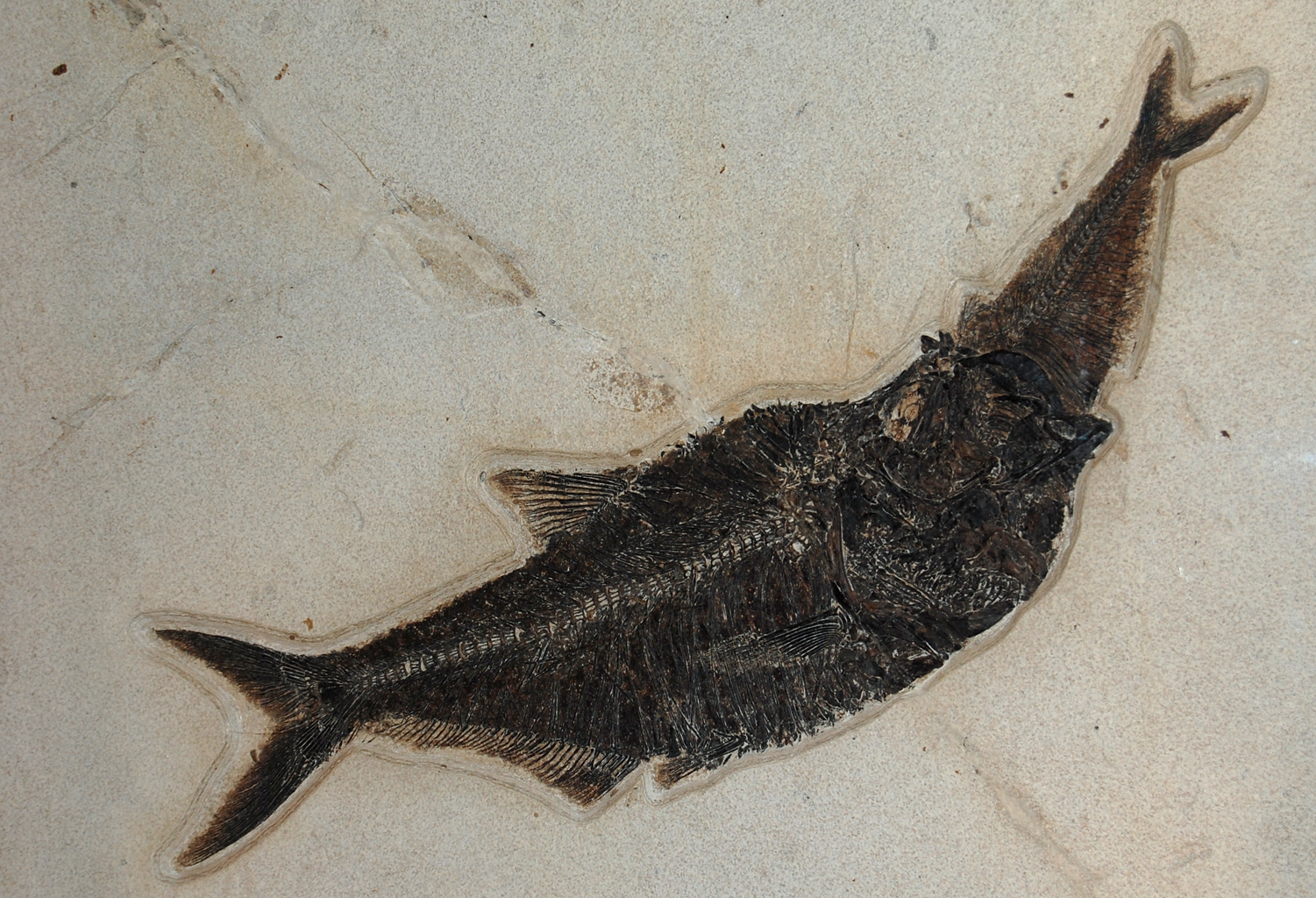
Specimen of Diplomystus swallowing another fish

=== Fish ===
- Diplomystus (a small relative of the herring, numerous fossils of individuals that died while trying to swallow other fishes, including smaller individuals of the same species, are known)
- Thyrsocles (fossil specimen found with the stomach stuffed with the extinct herring Xyne grex)
- Xiphactinus (a 4-meter-long specimen was found with a perfectly preserved skeleton of its relative, Gillicus, in its stomach)

=== Reptiles ===
- Baryonyx (an opportunistic predator that had a crocodile-like skull, and scales of the lepidotid fish Scheenstia have been found in a skeleton where the stomach should be)
- Elasmosaurus (long neck, stereoscopically positioned eyes, and long teeth are thought to be adaptations for stalking and trapping fish and other schooling animals)
- Laganosuchus (flattened head suggests that it passively waited for fish to swim near its mouth in order to engulf them)
- Ornithocheirus (hypothesized to be piscivorous due to anatomy of its jaws and dentition)
- Pteranodon (remains of fish found in the beaks and stomach cavities of some specimens)
- Spinosaurus (close relative of Baryonyx, is hypothesized to have preyed on fish because of giant coelacanthids found in the same environment, and due to anatomical features, including a pressure-sensitive snout that could have detected movements of swimming prey)
- Titanoboa (multiple cranial and biochemical characteristics suggest that it was primarily piscivorous)
