= Cirrimaxilla =

Conservation status
- Data Deficient (IUCN 3.1)

Scientific classification
- Kingdom: Animalia
- Phylum: Chordata
- Class: Actinopterygii
- Order: Anguilliformes
- Family: Muraenidae
- Genus: Cirrimaxilla; Hong Ming Chen & K. T. Shao, 1995
- Species: C. formosa

Binomial name
- Cirrimaxilla formosa Hong Ming Chen & K. T. Shao, 1995

Genus of fishes

The Taiwanese barbel moray, Cirrimaxilla formosa, is a species of moray eel in the family Muraenidae, and the only member of the genus Cirrimaxilla. It was described by Hong Ming Chen and K. T. Shao in 1995. It is found only in Pingtung County, Taiwan. The holotype, a female, measures a total length of 16.6 centimetres (6.5 in).
