= Banded moray =

Banded moray is a common name for several fishes and may refer to:

- Channomuraena vittata
- Echidna polyzona
- Gymnothorax rueppelliae

== See also ==
- Myrichthys colubrinus, banded snake eel
- Gymnomuraena zebra, zebra moray
