= James Dwight Dana =

American scientist (1813–1895)

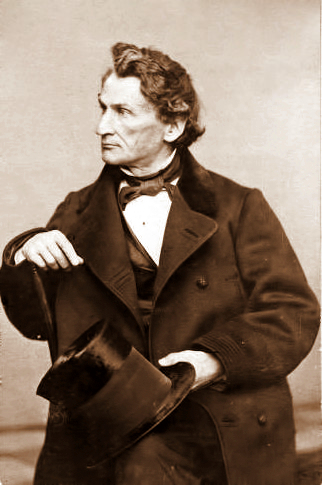
- Dana in 1865
- Born: February 12, 1813; Utica, New York
- Died: April 14, 1895 (aged 82); New Haven, Connecticut
- Scientific career
- Fields: geology, mineralogy, zoology
- Author abbrev. (zoology): Dana

Signature
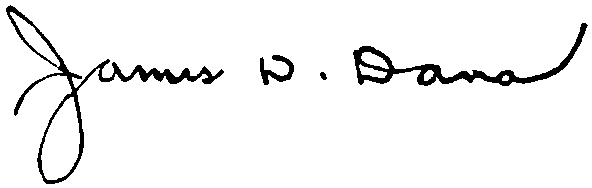

James Dwight Dana FRS FRSE (February 12, 1813 – April 14, 1895) was an American geologist, mineralogist, volcanologist, and zoologist. He made pioneering studies of mountain-building, volcanic activity, and the origin and structure of continents and oceans around the world.

His zoological author abbreviation is Dana.

== Early life and career ==
Dana was born February 12, 1813, in Utica, New York. His father was merchant James Dana (1780–1860) and his mother was Harriet Dwight (1792–1870). Through his mother he was related to the Dwight New England family of missionaries and educators including uncle Harrison Gray Otis Dwight and first cousin Henry Otis Dwight. He showed an early interest in science, which had been fostered by Fay Edgerton, a teacher in the Utica high school, and in 1830 he entered Yale College in order to study under Benjamin Silliman the elder.

Graduating in 1833, for the next two years he was teacher of mathematics to midshipmen in the Navy, and sailed to the Mediterranean while engaged in his duties. In 1836 and 1837 he was assistant to Professor Silliman in the chemical laboratory at Yale, and then, for four years, acted as mineralogist and geologist of the United States Exploring Expedition, commanded by Captain Charles Wilkes, in the Pacific Ocean. His labors in preparing the reports of his explorations occupied parts of thirteen years after his return to America in 1842. His notebooks from the four years of travel contained fifty sketches, maps, and diagrams, including views of both Mount Shasta and Castle Crags. Dana's sketch of Mount Shasta was engraved in 1849 for publication in the American Journal of Science and Arts (which Silliman had founded in 1818), along with a lengthy article based on Dana's 1841 geological notes. In the article he described in scientific terms the rocks, minerals, and geology of the Shasta region. As far as is known, his sketch of Mount Shasta became the second view of the mountain ever published.

In 1844 he again became a resident of New Haven, and married Professor Silliman's daughter, Henrietta Frances Silliman. In 1850, he was appointed as Silliman's successor, as Silliman Professor of Natural History and Geology in Yale College, a position which he held until 1892. In 1846 he became joint editor, and during the later years of his life was chief editor, of the American Journal of Science and Arts, to which he was a constant contributor, principally of articles on geology and mineralogy.

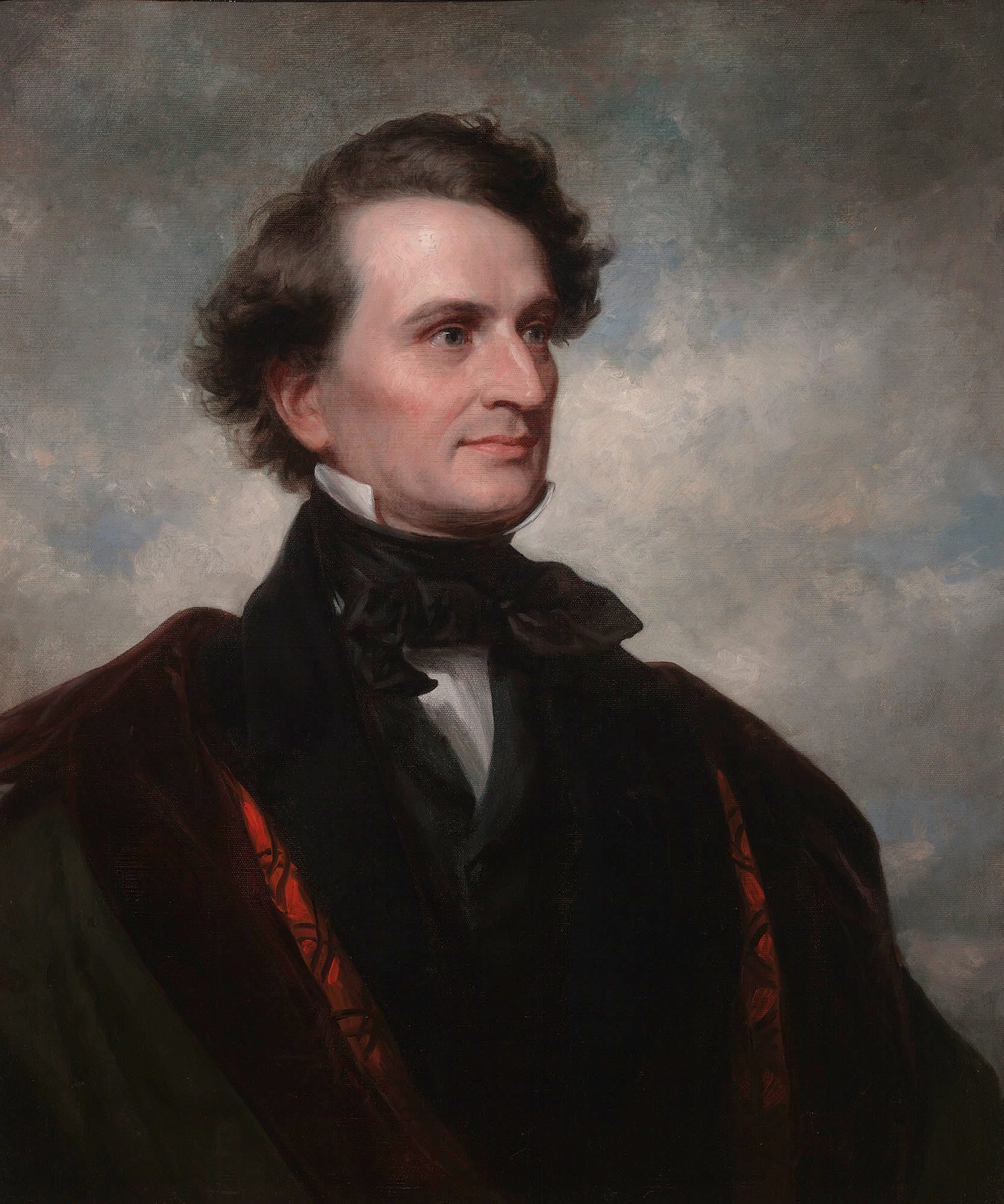
Dana, painted by Daniel Huntington in 1858

The 1849 publication of his geology of Mount Shasta was undoubtedly a response to the California gold rush publicity. Dana was the pre-eminent U.S. geologist of his time, and he also was one of the few trained observers anywhere who had first-hand knowledge of the northern California terrain. He had previously written that there was a likelihood that gold was to be found all along the route between the Umpqua River in Oregon and the Sacramento Valley. He was probably deluged with inquiries about the Shasta region, and was forced to publish in more detail some advice to the would-be gold miners.

He was elected as a member to the American Philosophical Society in 1854.

Dana was responsible for developing much of the early knowledge on Hawaiian volcanism. In 1880 and 1881 he led the first geological study of the volcanics of Hawaii island. Dana theorized that the volcanic chain consisted of two volcanic strands, dubbed the "Loa" and "Kea" trends. The Kea trend included Kīlauea, Mauna Kea, Kohala, Haleakala, and West Maui. The Loa trend includes Kamaʻehuakanaloa (formerly Lōʻihi), Mauna Loa, Hualālai, Kahoʻolawe, Lānaʻi, and West Molokaʻi.

Following another expedition by fellow geologist C. E. Dutton in 1884, Dana returned to the island once again and in 1890 he published a manuscript on the island that was the most detailed of its day, and would be the definitive source upon the island's volcanics for decades.

Dana was a beloved teacher of geology. According to Oliver C. Farrington, To SIT at the feet of Professor Dana and drink from the overflowing fountains of his knowledge, was a privilege which once enjoyed could never be forgotten. Some examples of his teaching style were given by Oliver C. Farrington

The quality in an investigator which, other things being equal, he seemed to esteem most highly, was that of carefulness. How often were his students advised to trust or to doubt the statements of an author according as he was or was not, in the opinion of Professor Dana a careful man. With hasty and ill-considered conclusions or elaborate theories built from meager observations he had no patience, but to opinions which he believed had been derived from a careful and thorough study of facts, he was ever ready to give the fullest consideration, however much they might be opposed to his previous conclusions. "More," he said, "could be learned by studying unconformities than conformities," and this he believed to be as true of unconformable opinions as of heterogeneous strata.

Professor Dana's first teacher was an ardent student of nature who was wont to go with his pupils on long tramps for the purpose of collecting minerals, plants and insects, and aroused in them much of his own eagerness for the pursuit of knowledge. It is therefore but just that some of the fame of his distinguished pupil should be attributed to him. One incident which Professor Dana used to relate to illustrate his teacher's fervor as a collector was that when on one occasion his little party had gathered at a remote place more mineral specimens than they could carry in their hands, the master, in preference to leaving any behind, improvised a bag from a pair of trousers and thus bore them safely to their destination.

Dana died on April 14, 1895.

== Family ==
Dana was married to Henrietta Frances, daughter of Benjamin Silliman, in 1844.

Their son, Edward Salisbury Dana (1849–1935), was also a distinguished mineralogist.

== Publications ==
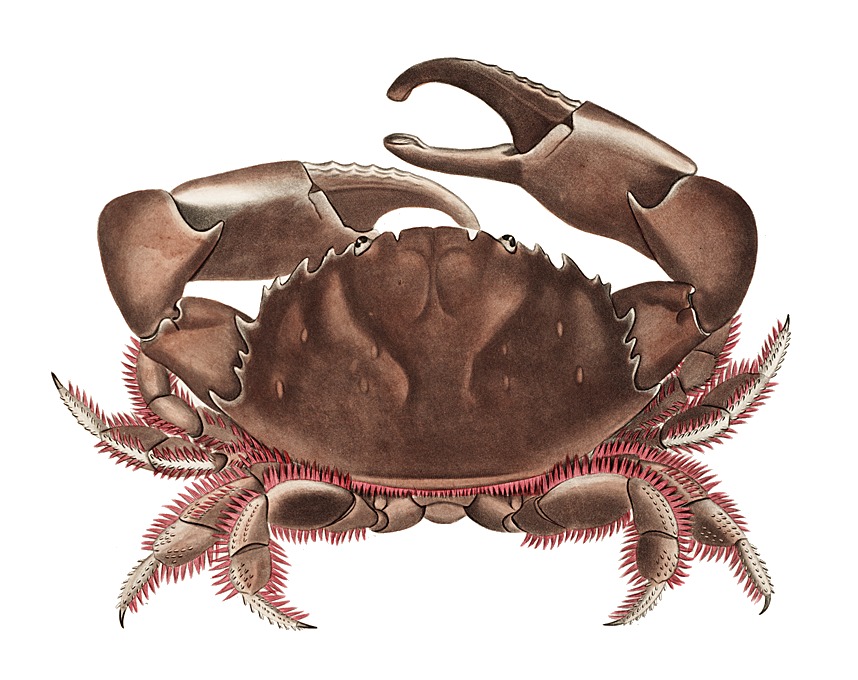
Etisus dentatus, from Dana's 1855 work Crustacea

Dana's best known books were his

- System of Mineralogy (1837)
- Manual of Mineralogy (1848), and his Manual of Geology (1863). A bibliographical list of his writings shows 214 titles of books and papers, beginning in 1835 with a paper on the conditions of Vesuvius in 1834. His reports on Zoophytes, on the Geology of the Pacific Area, and on Crustacea, summarizing his work on the Wilkes Expedition, appeared from 1846 onwards. Other works included Manual of Mineralogy (1848), afterwards entitled Manual of Mineralogy and Lithology (ed. 4, 1887); and Corals and Coral Islands (1872; revised ed. 1890). In 1887, Dana revisited the Hawaiian Islands, and the results of his further investigations were published in a quarto volume entitled Characteristics of Volcanoes (1890).

The Manual of Mineralogy by J. D. Dana became a standard college text, and has been continuously revised and updated by a succession of editors including W. E. Ford (13th-14th eds., 1912–1929), Cornelius S. Hurlbut (15th-21st eds., 1941–1999), and beginning with the 22nd by Cornelis Klein. The 23rd edition is now in print under the title Manual of Mineral Science (Manual of Mineralogy) (2007), revised by Cornelis Klein and Barbara Dutrow.

Dana's System of Mineralogy has also been revised, the 6th edition (1892) being edited by his son Edward Salisbury Dana. A 7th edition was published in 1944, and the 8th edition was published in 1997 under the title Dana's New Mineralogy, edited by R. V. Gaines et al.

Between 1856 and 1885, Dana published a number of manuscripts in an effort to reconcile scientific findings with the Bible. Among these, he wrote Science and the Bible: A Review of "The Six Days of Creation" of Prof. Tayler Lewis (1856), and Creation, Or, The Biblical Cosmogony in the Light of Modern Science (1885).

== Awards and recognition ==
Dana was awarded the Copley Medal by the Royal Society in 1877, the Wollaston Medal by the Geological Society of London in 1874 and the Clarke Medal by the Royal Society of New South Wales in 1882. Dana was president of the Geological Society of America in 1890.

== Named in honor of Dana ==
- Dana Park in Albany, New York, with a fountain/monument in his honor
- Mount Dana (and the nearby Dana Meadows) in the Sierra Nevada, California, US
- Dorsa Dana (a wrinkle-ridge system) on the Moon
- Danalite, a mineral.
- Dana Passage in Puget Sound, US
- Dana, a crater on Mars
- The Dana Medal of the Mineralogical Society of America was named for Dana and his son Edward Salisbury Dana. It recognizes outstanding scientific contributions through research in the mineralogical sciences by an individual in the midst of their career.
- The James Dwight Dana House in New Haven, Connecticut was declared a National Historic Landmark in 1965.
- The fossil horseshoe crab Euproops danae
- Dana Peak in Alaska.

== See also ==
- Howlite
- European and American voyages of scientific exploration
- Dana's System of Mineralogy
- Category:Taxa named by James Dwight Dana
- Dana Classification System

== Additional sources ==
- American Mineralogist, Vol. 21 (1936), 173–177.
- *The Life of James Dwight Dana: Scientific Explorer, Mineralogist, Geologist, Zoologist, Professor in Yale University, Daniel Coit Gilman, Harper & Brothers Publishers, New York, 1899
- Artikel James Dwight Dana in der Encyclopædia Britannica von 1911. Gemeinfrei.
- David R. Oldroyd (1996): Thinking about the Earth, Harvard Press, ISBN 0-674-88382-9; dt.: Die Biographie der Erde. Zur Wissenschaftsgeschichte der Geologie, Frankfurt a.M., 1998.
- Johannes Uray, Chemische Theorie und mineralogische Klassifikationssysteme von der chemischen Revolution bis zur Mitte des 19. Jahrhunderts. In: Berhard Hubmann, Elmar Schübl, Johannes Seidl (eds.), Die Anfänge geologischer Forschung in Österreich. Beiträge zur Tagung „10 Jahre Arbeitsgruppe Geschichte der Erdwissenschaften Österreichs“ von 24. bis 26. April 2009 in Graz. Graz 2010, S 107–125.
- Stanton, William (1970–1980). "Dana, James Dwight". Dictionary of Scientific Biography. Vol. 3. New York: Charles Scribner's Sons. pp. 549–554. ISBN 978-0-684-10114-9.

Awards and achievements
Preceded by Frederick McCoy	Clarke Medal; 1882	Succeeded by Ferdinand von Mueller
