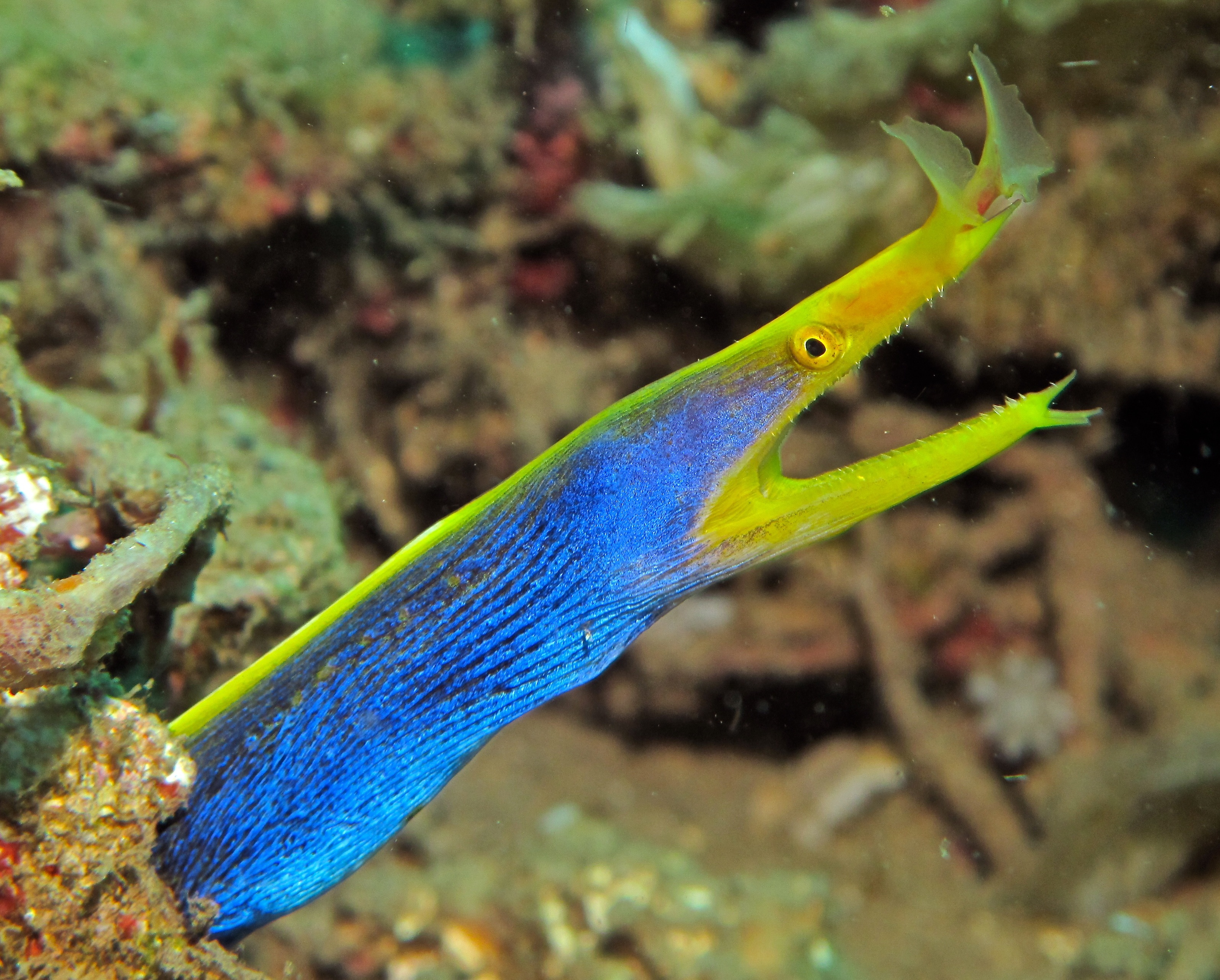

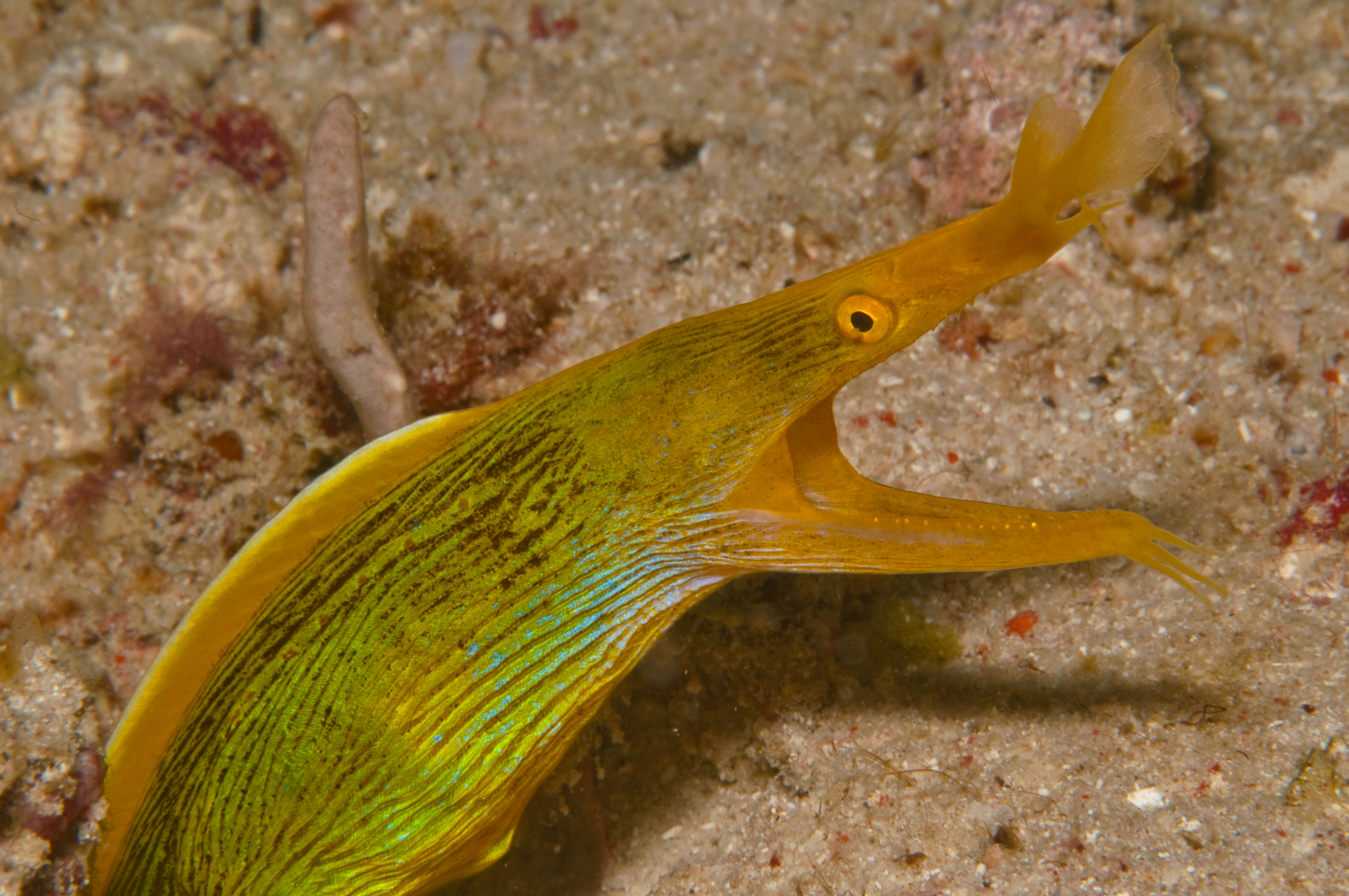
- Male (above) and female (below)

Conservation status
- Least Concern (IUCN 3.1)

Scientific classification
- Kingdom: Animalia
- Phylum: Chordata
- Class: Actinopterygii
- Order: Anguilliformes
- Family: Muraenidae
- Genus: Rhinomuraena; Garman, 1888
- Species: R. quaesita

Binomial name
- Rhinomuraena quaesita Garman, 1888

Synonyms
- Rhinomuraena amboinensis

= Ribbon eel =

Species of fish

The ribbon eel (Rhinomuraena quaesita), also known as the leaf-nosed moray eel or bernis eel, is a species of moray eel, the only member of the genus Rhinomuraena. The ribbon eel is found in sand burrows and reefs in the Indo-Pacific Ocean. Although generally placed in the moray eel family Muraenidae, it has several distinctive features leading some to place it in its own family, Rhinomuraenidae.

== Taxonomy ==
The ribbon eel is the only species in its genus, Rhinomuraena, in the subfamily Muraeninae of the moray eel family. Its unique morphology, such as its gonad structure and function, are not shared with many of the other major genera in the family and provided evidence for separation. Typically, eels of the family urogenital system follow a posterior pattern toward the anus of the eel, but the Rhinomuraena system has its sex cells move anteriorly. This change is presumed to be due to some evolutionary cause, like peripatric speciation. Previously, R. quaesita was used to identify the blue ribbon eels and R. amboinensis was used for black ribbon eels, but these are now recognized as the same species, R. quaesita.

Its closest known relative is the pink-lipped moray (Echidna rhodochilus), which does not form a monophyletic group with the other Echidna species.

== Distribution and habitat ==
Typically, ribbon eels can be found in tropical parts of the Indian and Pacific Ocean, ranging from East Africa to southern Japan, Australia, and French Polynesia. This species is widely distributed and are seen by divers in Indonesian waters with their heads and anterior bodies protruding from crevices in sand and rubble habitats, like coral reefs, which they are able to slip through with their slime coat.

Ribbon eels prefer relatively shallow waters, frequenting a depth range of 1 to 57 meters.

== Description ==
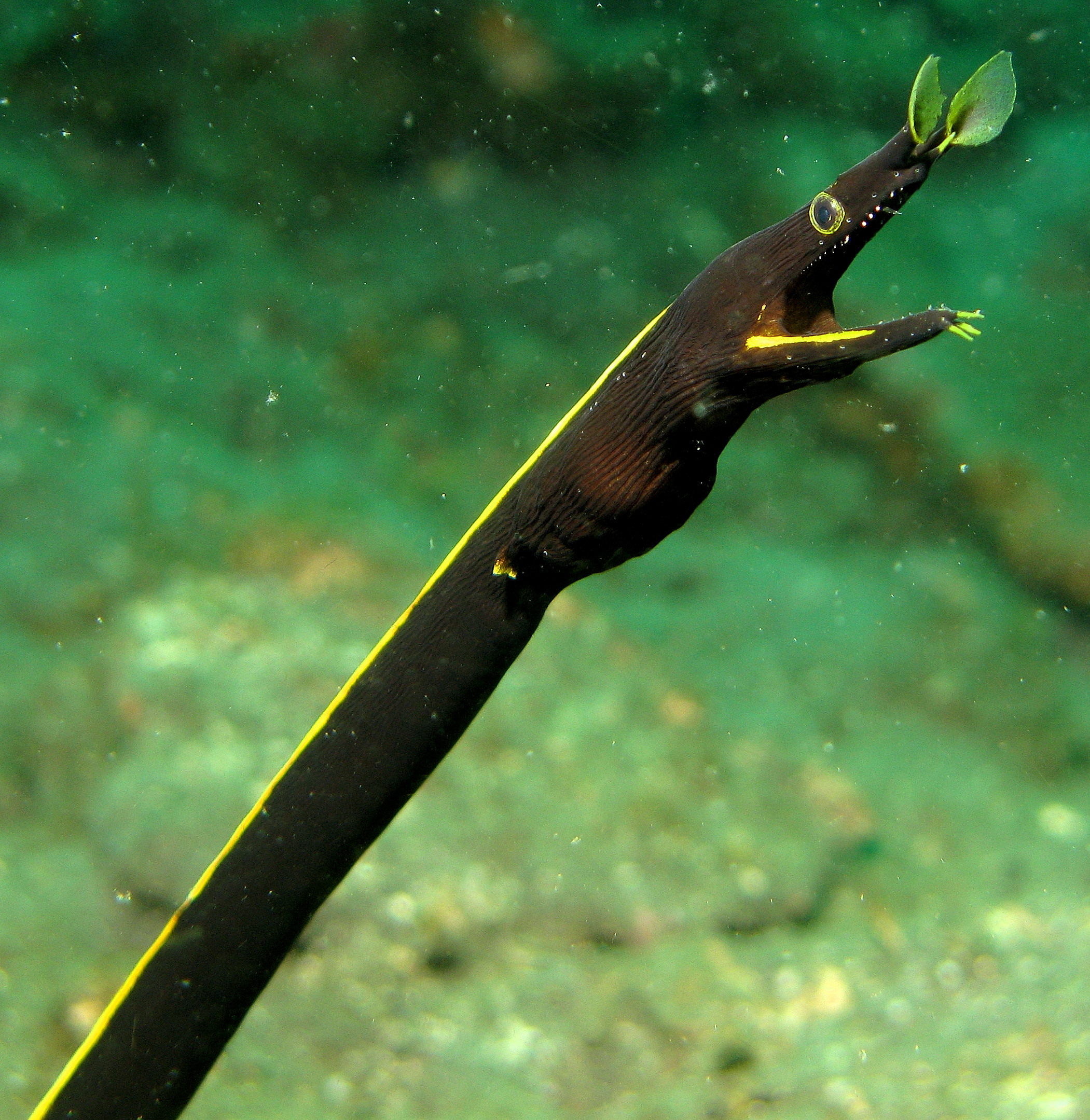
Black juvenile stage

The species is characterized by its long, thin body and high dorsal fins. The ribbon eel can easily be recognized by its expanded anterior nostrils and wide-open jaws. These eels can have up to 255 vertebrae in their back bone, making them one of the most narrow and elongated eel species known.

In their juvenile and subadult stages, ribbon eels appear primarily jet black with a yellow dorsal fin. In adult males, the black is replaced by a vibrant blue and yellow facial appearance. An adult female is entirely yellow or yellow with some blue to the posterior.

Color change related to sex change is not known from any other moray eel species. The blue adult males range from 65 to 94 cm (26 to 37 in) in length, while the larger yellow females can reach up to 130 cm (51 in).

The ribbon eel larva is described as a large, greenish leptocephalus.

== Biology ==
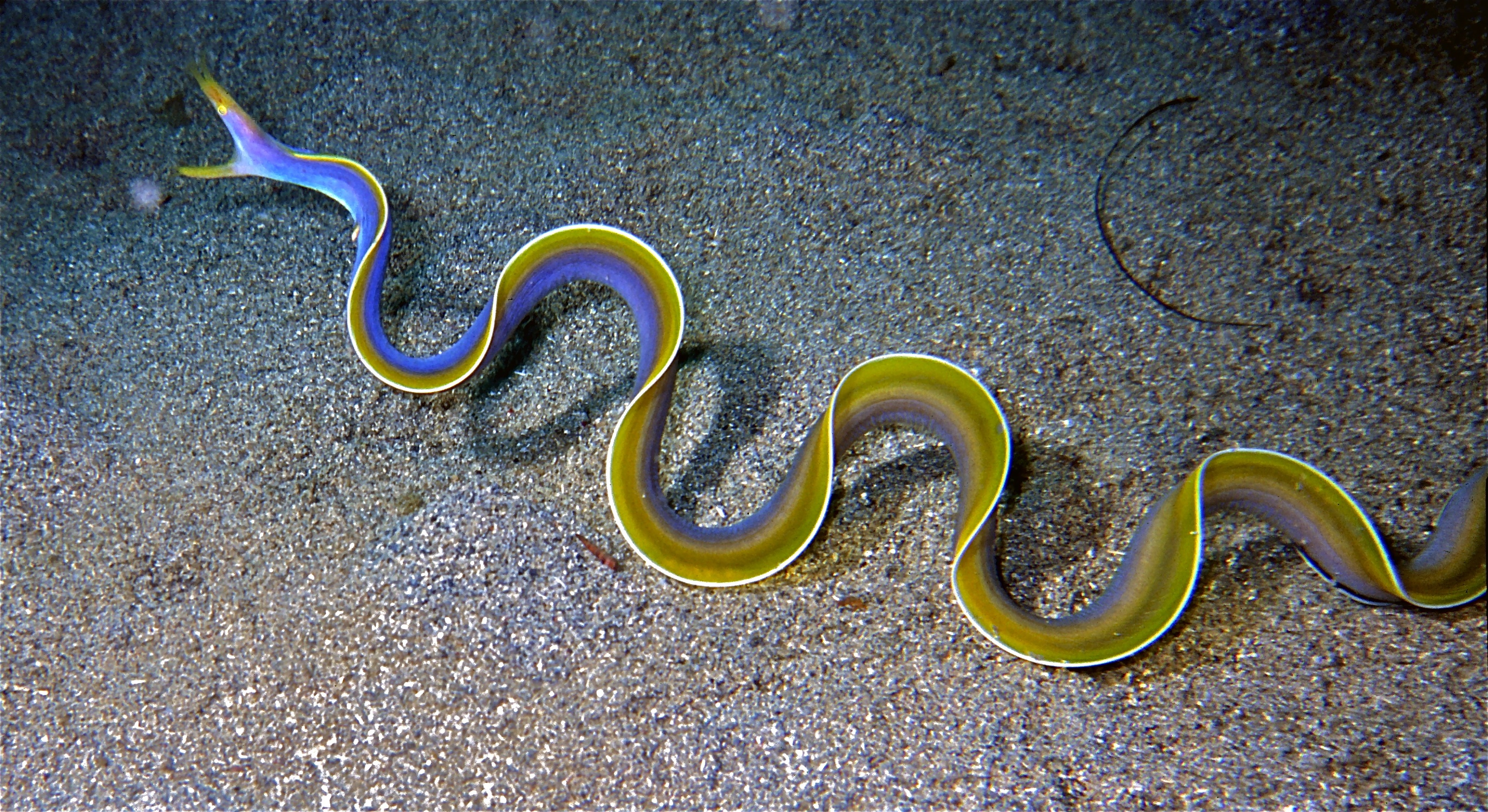
In Indonesia

It is presumed that even with its significant color changes throughout its development, coloring does not play a significant role in mating for a ribbon eel because the eels are colorblind (possessing only one of the two photoreceptor cells required to see colors). In its natural habitat, ribbon eels can live up to twenty years.

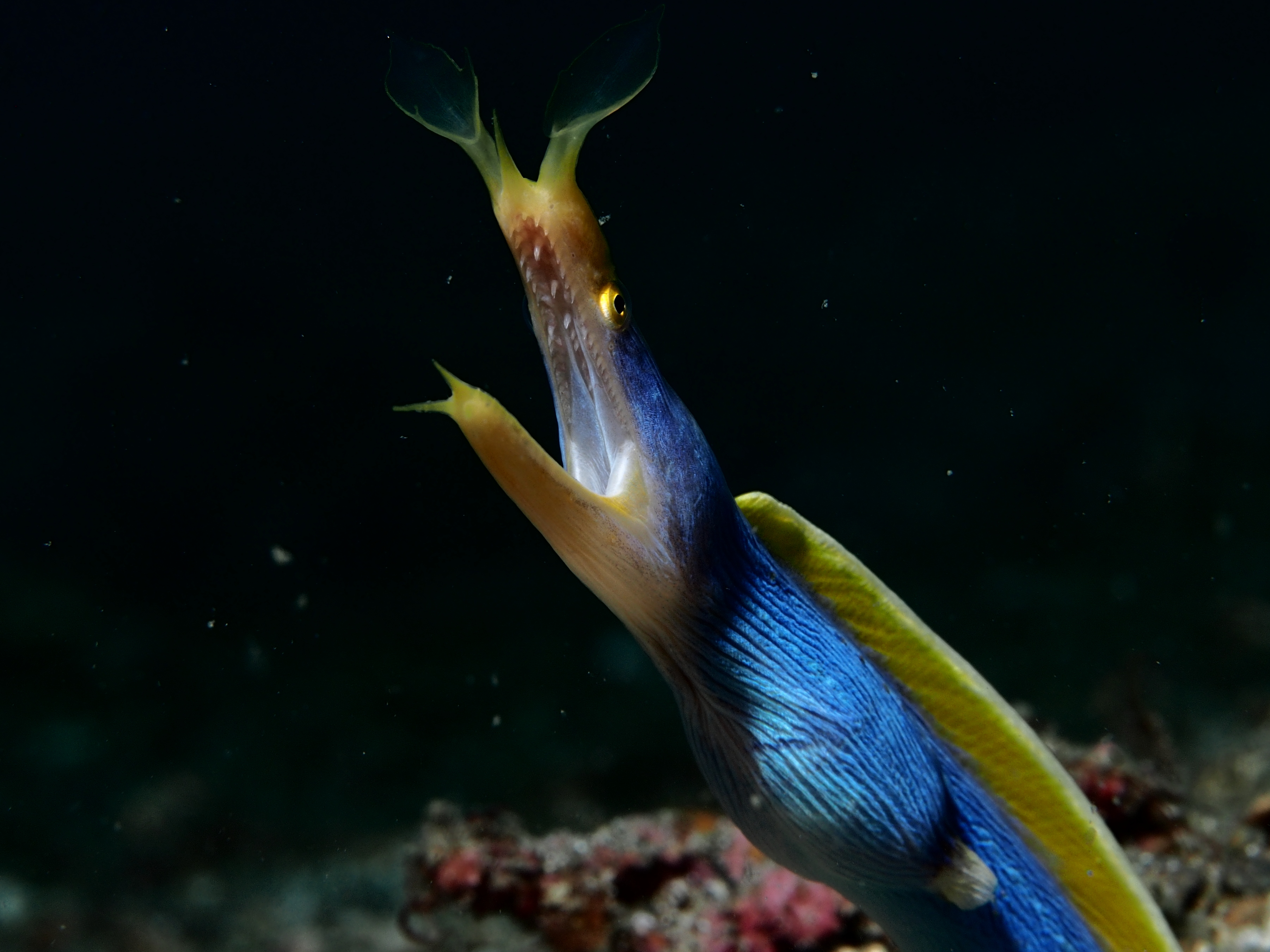
Showing teeth, in Indonesia

Ribbon eels are a diurnal species (active during the daytime). Based on observed color changes, it is generally considered a protandric hermaphrodite (male to female transformation). When necessary, male ribbon eels will develop reproductive organs, lay eggs, and then die. This developmental stage happens within about a month.

== Conservation ==
Ribbon eels are labeled "least concerned" on the IUCN Red List of Threatened Species as of 2009. Recent studies on the effects of various environmental factors on marine eels have presented potential threats to the ribbon eel population. Marine eels that prefer to stay in shallower waters, specifically around coral reef habitats, are most at risk of suffering from the impacts of coral bleaching and other marine habitat damage caused by climate change or human activity (i.e. pollution). The shift in habitat structure and diversity could make it harder for ribbon eels to find enough prey to survive and reproduce. Overfishing is another concern as it can lead to a reduction in the number of ribbon eels and their available prey.

== Captivity ==
Most ribbon eels do not live longer than a year in captivity. Ribbon eels have been observed in many cases to stop eating after being captured and put into home aquariums. Higher levels of success have been achieved in public aquaria, where there are a few reported cases of spawning at facilities in Europe and North America. In captivity, the color differences are not related to maturity or sex.

Although captured for the aquarium industry, it remains common and widespread, and is not considered threatened.
