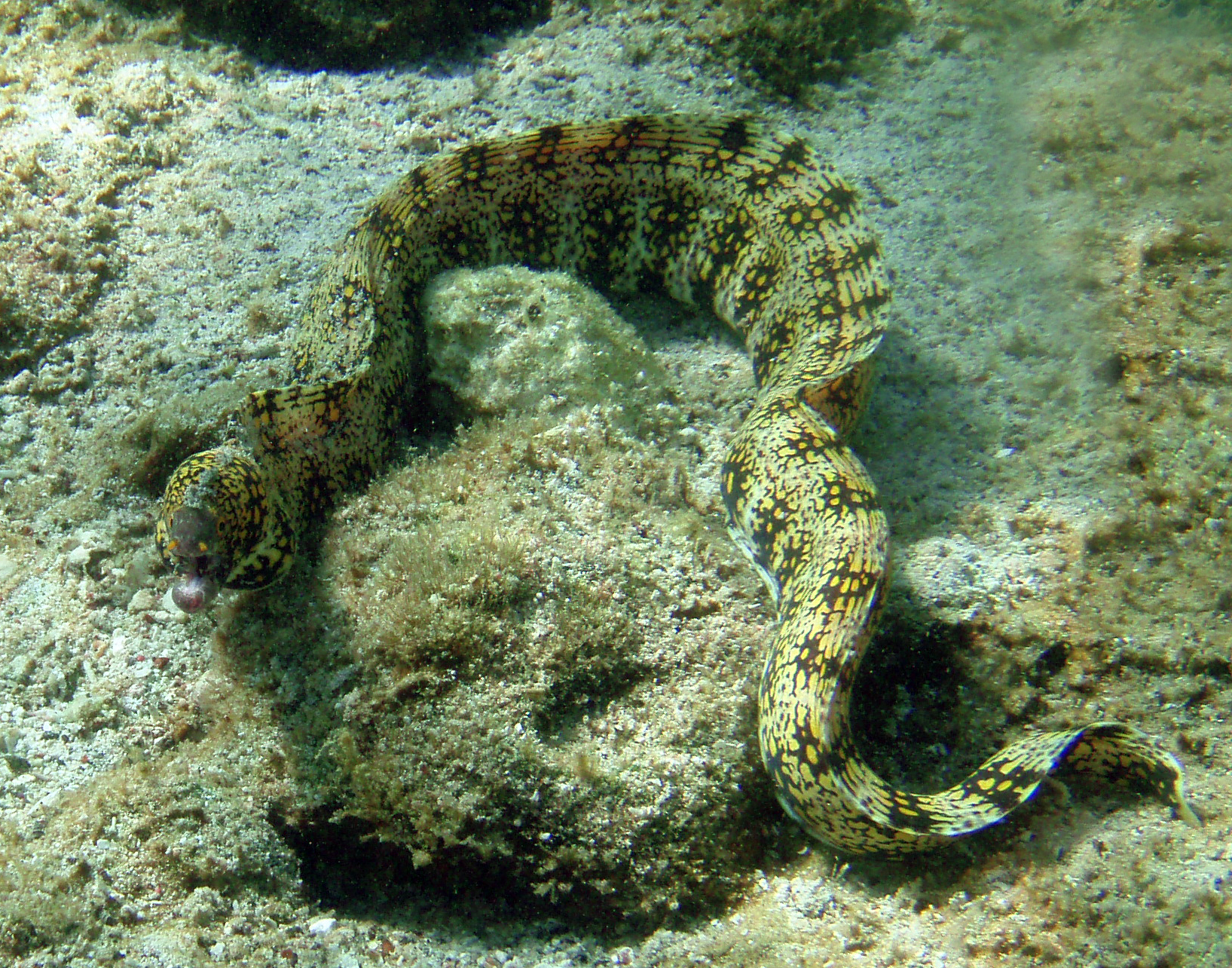

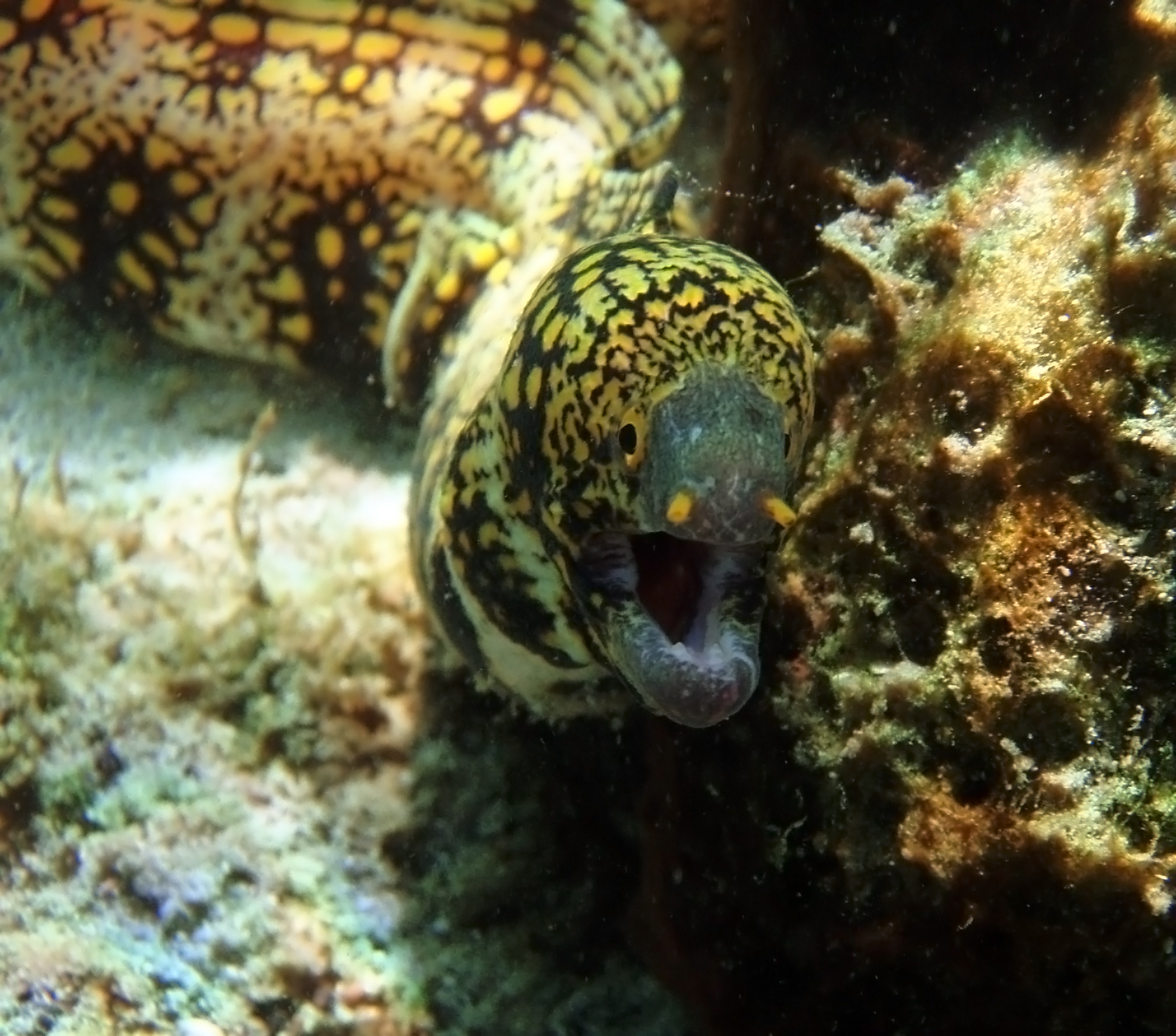
- Snowflake moray, Echidna nebulosa

Conservation status
- Least Concern (IUCN 3.1)

Scientific classification
- Kingdom: Animalia
- Phylum: Chordata
- Class: Actinopterygii
- Division: Teleostei
- Order: Anguilliformes
- Family: Muraenidae
- Genus: Echidna
- Species: E. nebulosa

Binomial name
- Echidna nebulosa (J. N. Ahl, 1789)

Synonyms
- Echidna variegata Forster, 1848; Gymnothorax boschi ( Bleeker, 1853); Gymnothorax boschii (Bleeker, 1853); Lycodontis boschi (Bleeker, 1853); Muraena boschii Bleeker, 1853; Muraena nebulosa Ahl, 1789; Muraena ophis Rüppell, 1830; Poecilophis nebulosa (Ahl, 1789)

= Snowflake moray =

Species of fish

The snowflake moray (Echidna nebulosa), also known as the clouded moray among many vernacular names, is a species of marine eel of the family Muraenidae. It has blunt teeth ideal for its diet of crustaceans, a trait it shares with the zebra moray (Gymnomuraena zebra).

Its Hawaiian name is puhi-kapa, which originates from King Kamehameha I's nickname. The genus name is derived from the Greek word echidna meaning "viper", and the species name, nebulosa, originates from the Latin word nebulosus meaning "misty" or "cloudy".

It is widespread throughout the Indo-Pacific area from the eastern coast of Africa throughout Micronesia including the Red Sea and to Hawaii. The species is also found in the eastern Central Pacific from southern Baja California, Mexico, and from Costa Rica to northern Colombia.

This species reaches a length of 100 centimetres (39 in) but its common size is 50 centimetres (20 in). They live at depths ranging from 1 and 48 meters.

== Description and biology ==
The snowflake moray has a blunt white snout that goes into a yellowish, brown, and black striped speckled pattern. They have a dorsal fin that runs the length of its body. Protruding out of their snout, they have two yellow tubular nostrils angled down and another pair closer to their eyes. Moray eels' eyesight is poor, and their heightened sense of smell compensates for this. They have small blunt teeth rather than sharp teeth. Their diet consists mainly of crustaceans, as well as small trapped fishes that have no way out. The snowflake moray, along with other species of morays, have pharyngeal jaws, which are a second set of jaws located in the throat or pharynx. This species is an unconfirmed protogynous hermaphrodite, meaning that they are able to change sex during their lifetime. Snowflake morays are also scale-less, secreting a mucus over their skin that allows for easy maneuverability in and around holes in their environment.

This species reaches a length of 100 centimeters (39 in) but is commonly found at a length of 50 centimeters (20 in).

== Distribution ==
This species is distributed throughout the Indo-Pacific area from the eastern coast of Africa throughout Micronesia including the Red Sea and to Hawaii. It is also found in the eastern Central Pacific from southern Baja California, Mexico, and from Costa Rica to northern Colombia.

== Habitat ==
The snowflake moray is often found residing in seagrass beds with rock rubble, rocky shallows, intertidal reef flats, and tide pools. They live at depths ranging from 1 and 48 meters.

== In the aquarium ==
The snowflake moray is a very commonly kept saltwater eel. They are very hardy and well-suited to life within an aquarium. Up to 36" in length in captivity, the snowflake moray requires an aquarium that is larger than 20 gallons (40–50 gallons when full grown) with a tight-fitting lid, as these eels (and all other eels) are good at escaping and can fit through surprisingly small holes in aquarium lids. The snowflake eel has been known to live to 15 years and older in captivity. They are carnivores, readily accepting just about any meaty foods, including krill, shrimp, silversides and octopus meat. Unless already acclimated to frozen foods, the moray eel will likely need to be fed with live ghost shrimp when first acquired. Weaning can be accomplished over time. The feeding of freshwater feeder fish (goldfish, rosy reds, etc.) will likely cause liver disease if fed to the eel, so such feeding should be avoided.

It is not safe for shrimp, crabs or lobsters to be kept with the snowflake moray, as crustaceans are their natural diet. Most other invertebrates, including starfish, anemones and sea urchins, can safely be kept with them. Snowflake morays are reef safe and will not bother corals, though these eels are messy eaters and will require strong filtration and a relatively large protein skimmer for the long-term health of any corals housed in their aquarium. The moray eel will likely consume very small fish such as damselfish. Compatible tankmates for the snowflake moray eel include other relatively large, aggressive fish, such as lionfish, tangs, triggerfish, wrasses, and possibly even other snowflake moray eels if they are both introduced to the tank at the same time. Snowflake moray eels can inflict a severe bite.
