= E. dentatus =

E. dentatus may refer to:

- Elaeocarpus dentatus, the hinau, a forest tree species native of New Zealand
- Etisus dentatus, a crab species found in the Indo-Pacific

== See also ==
- Dentatus (disambiguation)
