= Dorsa Dana =

Dorsa Dana is a wrinkle ridge at 3.0°N 90.0°E in Mare Smythii on the Moon. It is 82 km long and was named after American geologist James Dwight Dana in 1976.
