= Echidna leucotaenia =

Conservation status
- Least Concern (IUCN 3.1)

Scientific classification
- Kingdom: Animalia
- Phylum: Chordata
- Class: Actinopterygii
- Order: Anguilliformes
- Family: Muraenidae
- Genus: Echidna
- Species: E. leucotaenia

Binomial name
- Echidna leucotaenia L. P. Schultz, 1943

Species of fish

Echidna leucotaenia, the whiteface moray, also known as the white-banded moray eel, is a moray eel (family Muraenidae). It was described by Schultz in 1943. It is a tropical, marine and freshwater eel which is known from the Indo-Pacific, including East Africa, the Line Islands, the Tuamotu Islands, and Johnston Island. It dwells at a depth range of 0 to 24 metres (0 to 79 ft), and leads a benthic lifestyle in reefs. Males can reach a maximum total length of 75 centimetres (30 in).

The whiteface moray's diet consists primarily of crabs.
