= Echidna unicolor =

Conservation status
- Least Concern (IUCN 3.1)

Scientific classification
- Kingdom: Animalia
- Phylum: Chordata
- Class: Actinopterygii
- Order: Anguilliformes
- Family: Muraenidae
- Genus: Echidna
- Species: E. unicolor

Binomial name
- Echidna unicolor L. P. Schultz, 1953

Species of fish

Echidna unicolor is a moray eel found in coral reefs in the Pacific and Indian Oceans. It was first named by Schultz in 1953, and is commonly known as the unicolor moray or the pale moray. It is usually completely tan or light brown in color, aside from a dark ring around each eye.
