= American Journal of Science =

- Discipline: Earth Science
- Language: English

Publication details
- History: 1818–present
- Publisher: American Journal of Science (United States of America)
- Frequency: 10/year
- Impact factor: 2.917 (2014)

Standard abbreviations
- ISO 4: Am. J. Sci.

Indexing
- ISSN: 0002-9599 (print); 1945-452X (web)

Links
- Journal homepage; Yale University page

The American Journal of Science (AJS) is the United States of America's longest-running scientific journal, having been published continuously since its conception in 1818 by Professor Benjamin Silliman, who edited and financed it himself. It was initially called the American Journal of Science and Arts until a name change in 1880, but its focus was always on natural sciences and especially on geology and related subjects.

In early years, the journal was often referred to as "Silliman's Journal", and the publication became associated with Yale University due to his long tenure there (1804–1853). The editorship long remained in the family of Professor Silliman, as he was assisted by his son, Benjamin Silliman Jr., from 1838. On the death of the elder Silliman in 1864, he was succeeded as chief editor by his son-in-law, James Dwight Dana, and then from 1895 till 1926 by Dana's son Edward Salisbury Dana. Associate editors included the botanist Asa Gray and the zoologist Louis Agassiz.

The current editors are Mark Brandon Yale University, C. Page Chamberlain Stanford University, Louis Derry Cornell University, Francis Macdonald UC Berkeley, and Ann Pearson Harvard University.
