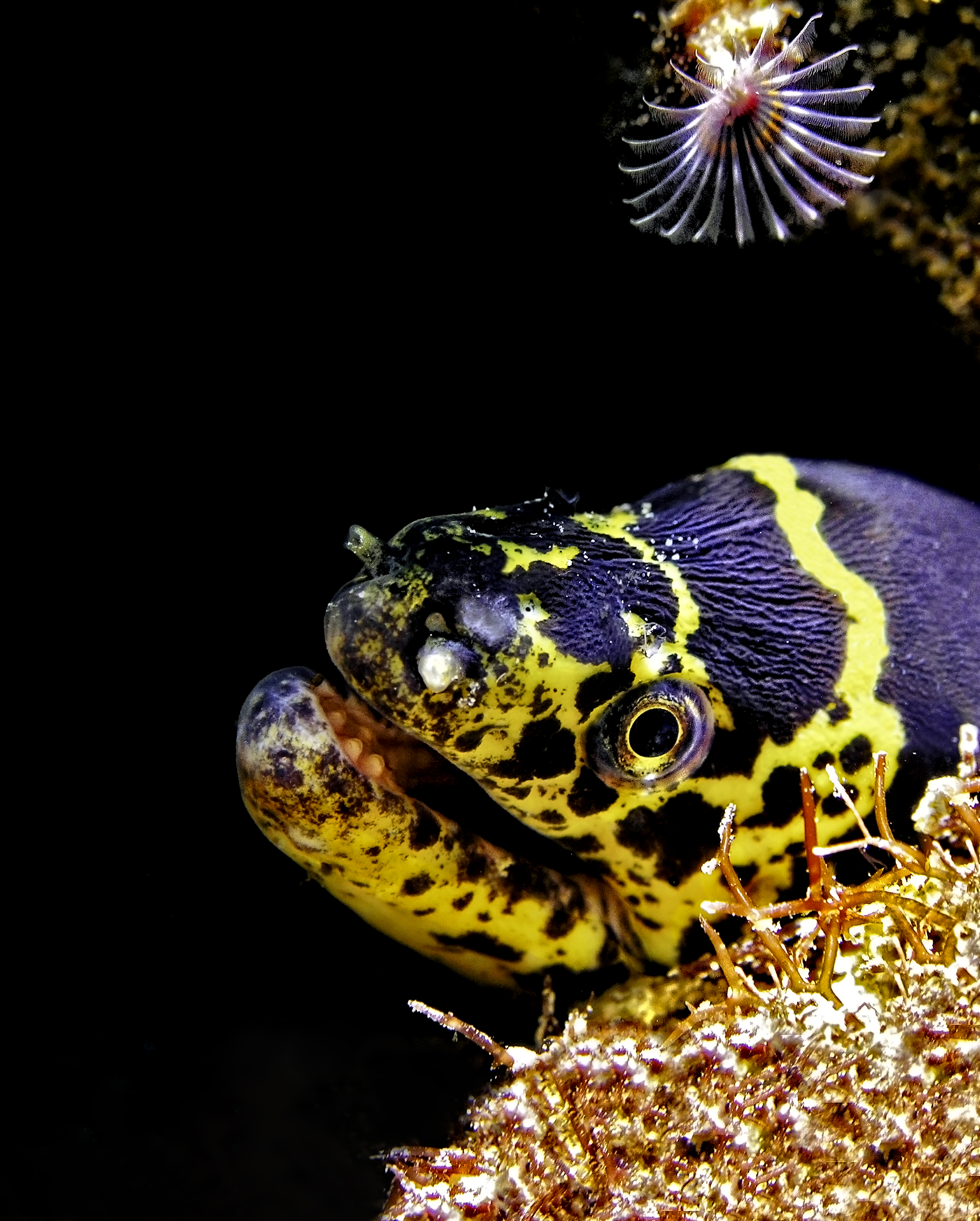

Conservation status
- Least Concern (IUCN 3.1)

Scientific classification
- Kingdom: Animalia
- Phylum: Chordata
- Class: Actinopterygii
- Order: Anguilliformes
- Family: Muraenidae
- Genus: Echidna
- Species: E. catenata

Binomial name
- Echidna catenata (Bloch, 1795)

Synonyms
- Echida catenata (Bloch, 1795); Echidna catenata flavofasciata Poey, 1867; Echidna flavofasciata Poey, 1867; Echidna fuscomaculata Poey, 1867; Gymnothorax catenatus Bloch, 1795; Muraena alusis Bleeker, 1856; Muraena catenata (Bloch, 1795); Muraena sordida Cuvier, 1816; Muraenophis catenula Lacepède, 1803; Poecilophis catenatus (Bloch, 1795)

= Chain moray =

Species of fish

Echidna catenata, commonly known as the chain moray, is a moray eel found in shallow parts of the western Atlantic Ocean and from islands elsewhere in the Atlantic. It occasionally makes its way into the aquarium trade. It grows to a maximum length of 165 cm (65 in) but a more common length is about 40 cm (16 in).

== Description ==
The chain moray is an elongated, heavy, eel-like fish that commonly grows to a length of about 30 to 45 cm (12 to 18 in). The head has a rounded snout and pointed, blunt teeth, especially on the roof of the mouth. These teeth are used to crush the shells of crabs, their main source of food. The dorsal, tail and anal fins are combined into a single long fin, and there are no pectoral or ventral fins. The skin does not bear scales, but is covered with a layer of clear mucus. This fish is dark brown to black, marked with an interconnecting lattice-work of yellow, chain-like lines. The eyes are yellow.

== Distribution and habitat ==
The species is found in the western Atlantic Ocean, where its range extends from Bermuda, Florida, and The Bahamas, to the Antilles and Brazil. It is common in the Caribbean, and is also reported from the eastern Atlantic (Cape Verde and Ascension Island) and some southern Atlantic islands. It is found on reefs and rocky shores in clear water at depths of less than 12 m (39 ft), and usually within 2 m (6.6 ft) of the surface.

== Ecology ==
Mainly nocturnal, the chain moray hides in holes and crevices in shallow water during the day, often with its head projecting. It continually opens and closes its mouth to increase the flow of water over its gills. A carnivore, it feeds on such organisms as crabs, which are the mainstay of its diet, shrimps, worms, octopuses and small fish. Its blunt teeth are especially adapted for feeding on crustaceans. It does not always leave its hiding place to forage, sometimes remaining where it is, ready to grab any prey that passes. It sometimes forages in tide pools and is able to survive for up to half an hour out of water. As well as ambushing prey, its feeding strategies include searching under the rims of pools, beneath rocks and in holes for prey, stalking observed prey or chasing it for a distance of up to 5 m (16 ft). When close enough to its prey, usually when it is within 5 to 10 cm (2 to 4 in), it strikes, an action it can perform with its body wholly or partly out of the water. When captured, large crabs are torn apart while small ones are swallowed whole.
