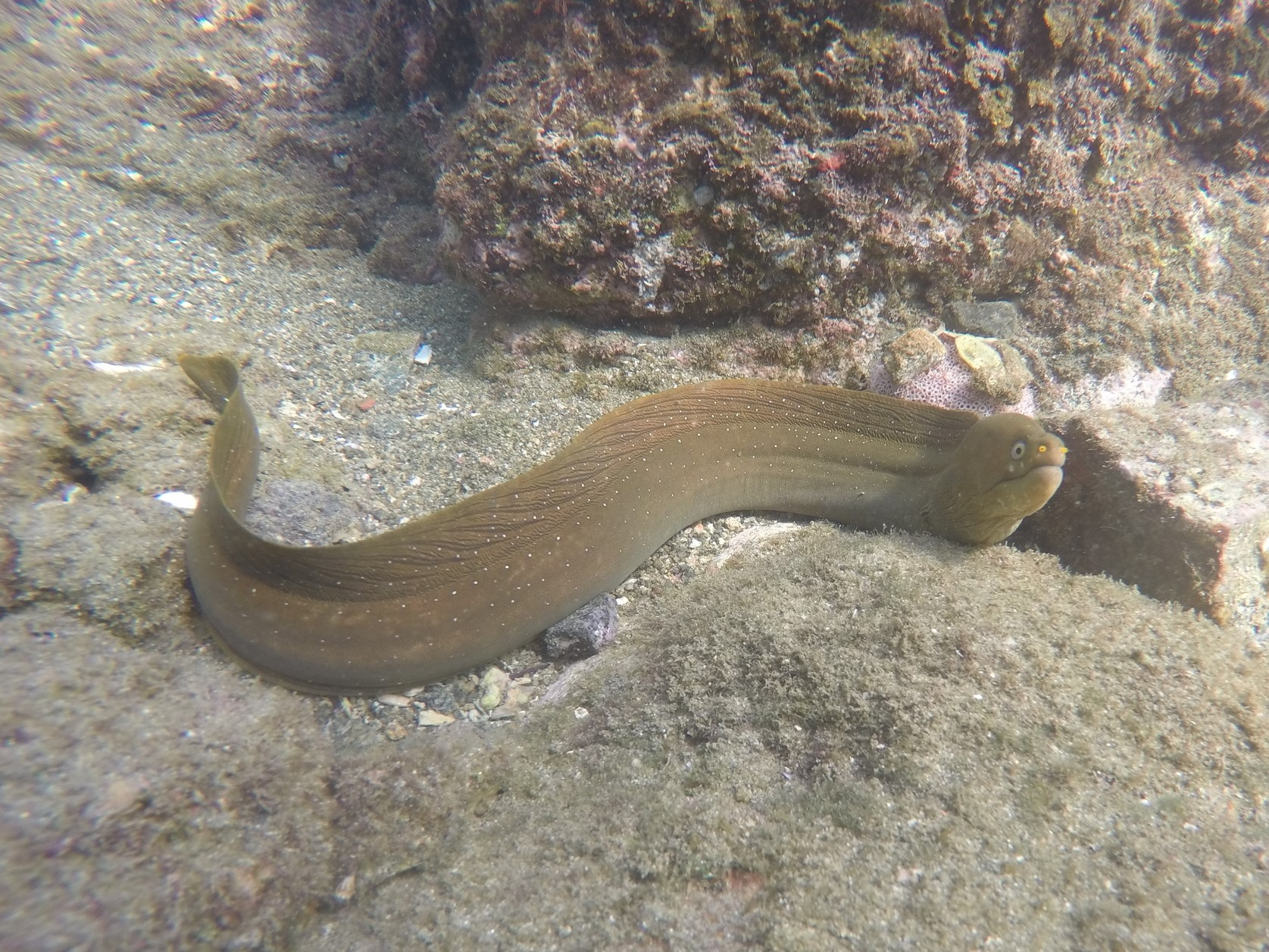

Scientific classification
- Kingdom: Animalia
- Phylum: Chordata
- Class: Actinopterygii
- Division: Teleostei
- Order: Anguilliformes
- Family: Muraenidae
- Genus: Echidna
- Species: E. nocturna

Binomial name
- Echidna nocturna (Cope, 1872)

= Echidna nocturna =

Species of fish

Echidna nocturna is a moray eel found in the eastern Pacific Ocean, in the Gulf of California and around Peru and the Galapagos Islands. It was first named by Cope in 1872, and is commonly known as the freckled moray or the palenose moray. It was discovered that Echidna nocturna and Muraena acutis are the same species.

== Description ==
Echidna nocturna has a long snake-like body with an average vertebral count of 120.4 vertebrae. The average length of an adult eel is 48.26 cm. Juveniles range in size from 8.52 cm to 35.48 cm with the average length being 22 cm. They weigh between 1.12g and 296.1 g with the average weight being 49.62 grams. It is gray-brown in color with rows of small white spots along its body. Its nose is paler in color compared to the rest of its body.

== Habitat and distribution ==
Echidna nocturna habitats are distributed throughout the tropical Eastern Pacific Ocean. They are found in both intertidal and coral reef habitats. Juveniles typically reside in rocky shore tidepools while adults reside near the tidepools or in coral reefs. Like other moray eels they have a pelagic larval phase.

== Diet ==
Echidna nocturna is an exclusively carnivorous species. They have a low niche breadth, meaning they are specialized feeders. Their diet consists primarily of the shrimp Penaeoidea. They also consume crabs, stomatopods, and some other small animals. Echidna nocturna are sometimes host to Theletrum lamothei, a species of digenean parasite. This species of Theletrum was first discovered in the intestine of Echidna nocturna.
