= Edward Salisbury Dana =

American mineralogist and physicist (1849–1935)

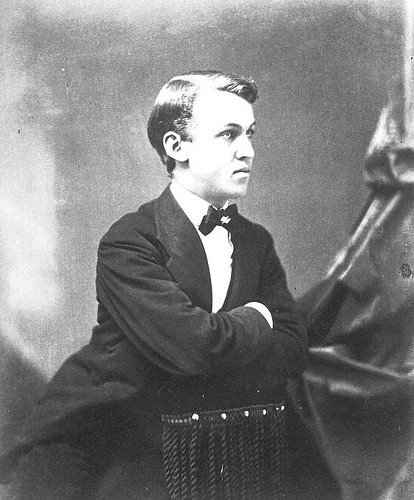
- Portrait of Edward Salisbury Dana, Yale College Class of 1870
- Born: November 16, 1849; New Haven, Connecticut, US
- Died: June 16, 1935 (aged 85)
- Education: Yale College
- Scientific career
- Fields: mineralogy, physics

Signature
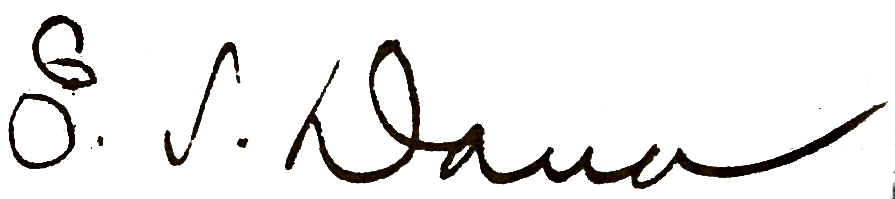

Edward Salisbury Dana (November 16, 1849 – June 16, 1935) was an American mineralogist and physicist. He made important contributions to the study of minerals, especially in the field of crystallography.

== Life and career ==
Dana was born in New Haven, Connecticut, the son of the geologist and mineralogist James Dwight Dana. He graduated from Yale College in 1870, where he had been a member of Scroll and Key, and then after two years with George J. Brush at the Sheffield Scientific School, spent another two years studying in Heidelberg and Vienna, specializing in crystal optics and crystallography. He then returned to Yale to take his M.A. and Ph.D. degrees. He was a member of the Connecticut Academy of Arts and Sciences.

He was appointed assistant professor of natural philosophy and astronomy at Yale in 1879 and then became professor of physics. His research and publishing was mainly in the field of mineralogy.

Dana became an editor of the American Journal of Science in 1875 and continued to direct it until 1926. In 1884, was elected a member of the National Academy of Sciences. In 1885, he was made a trustee of the Peabody Museum of Yale. He was an elected member of scientific societies in Austria, Mexico, Russia, England, Scotland, and across the United States. For example, he was elected to the American Academy of Arts and Sciences in 1893 and the American Philosophical Society in 1896.

== Personal memoir ==
From the Memorial by William F. Ford, published in American Mineralogist, 1936

Many American mineralogists at one time or another came into personal contact with Dana. They were familiar with his great charm, his unfailing good humor, his modesty and his delight in being able to offer assistance. He was the most delightful and entertaining companion, full of a quiet humor and ready with an appropriate story or reminiscence. Until very recently he was physically vigorous and delighted in long walks and climbs both about New Haven and among the hills of Mount Desert Island where he had his summer home. For years he was accustomed to ride about the streets of New Haven on a bicycle, and only relinquished the habit when his family protested that his age and the increase in motor traffic made the practice too dangerous. He probably owned an overcoat but the present writer cannot recall ever having seen him wear one. His only concession to winter weather was the occasional wearing of a light sweater under the coat of his suit. With his death Yale and New Haven have lost one of the last of the old-time gentleman scholars who contributed so largely to their fame.

== Publications ==
Dana's two most important publications were his Textbook of Mineralogy (1877) and the monumental sixth edition of his father's System of Mineralogy (1892).
