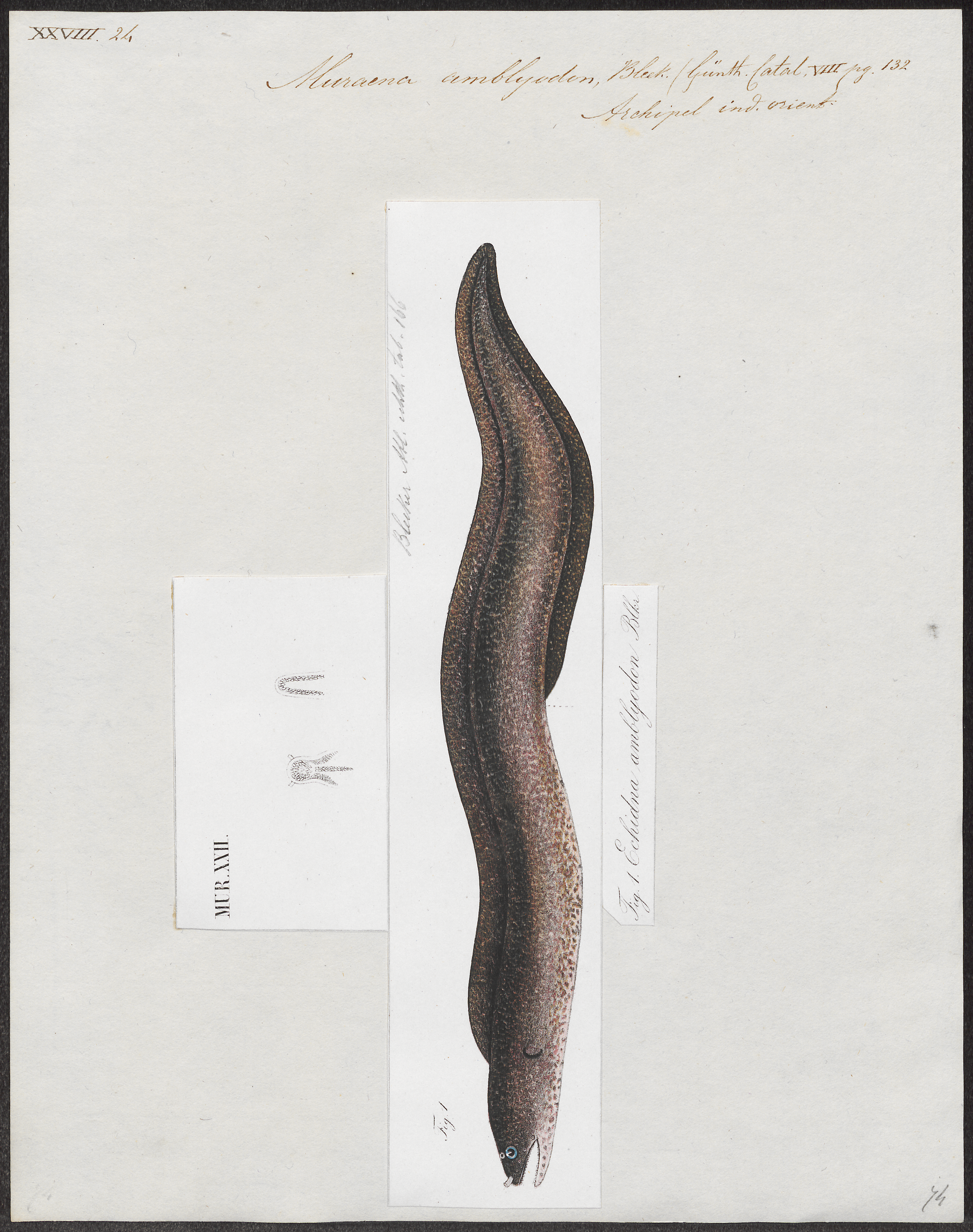

Conservation status
- Least Concern (IUCN 3.1)

Scientific classification
- Kingdom: Animalia
- Phylum: Chordata
- Class: Actinopterygii
- Order: Anguilliformes
- Family: Muraenidae
- Genus: Echidna
- Species: E. amblyodon

Binomial name
- Echidna amblyodon (Bleeker, 1856)

Synonyms
- Muraena amblyodon Bleeker, 1856

= Echidna amblyodon =

Species of fish

Echidna amblyodon, the Sulawesi moray is a moray eel found in the western central Pacific Ocean. It was described by Bleeker in 1856, originally under the genus Muraena. It is a marine, tropical eel which is known from Indonesia, in the western central Pacific Ocean. Males can reach a maximum total length of 20.5 centimetres (8.1 in).
