= Danalite =

Iron beryllium silicate sulfide mineral

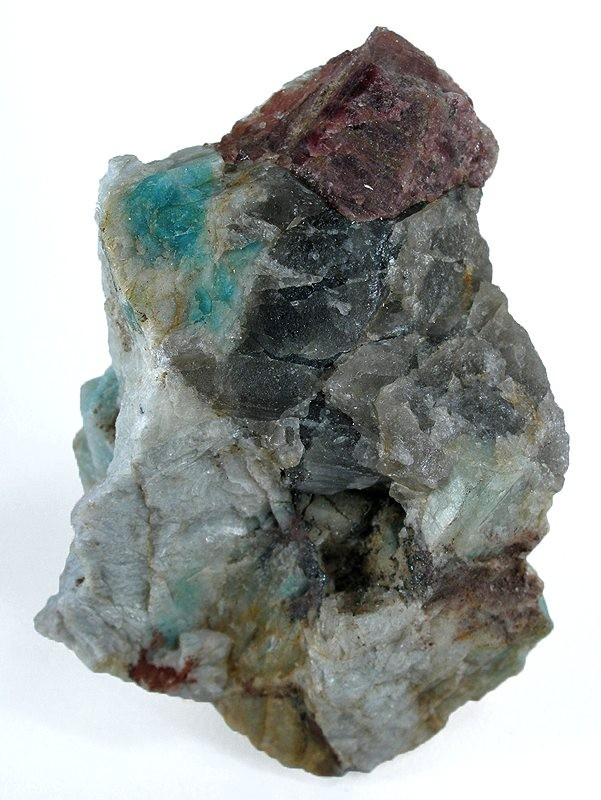

General
- Category: Tectosilicate minerals
- Group: Feldspathoid group
- Formula: Fe^{2+}_{4}Be_{3}(SiO_{4})_{3}S
- IMA symbol: Dan
- Strunz classification: 9.FB.10
- Dana classification: 76.02.04.02
- Crystal system: Isometric
- Crystal class: Hextetrahedral (4̅3m); H-M symbol: (4̅ 3m)
- Space group: P4̅3n

Identification
- Color: Yellow, pink, reddish brown, red: colorless to pink in thin section
- Crystal habit: Octahedral and dodecahedral crystals, typically massive or as segregations
- Cleavage: {111} and {11̅1}
- Fracture: Subconchoidal to uneven
- Tenacity: Brittle
- Mohs scale hardness: 5.5 to 6
- Luster: Vitreous or greasy
- Streak: Grey white
- Diaphaneity: Semitransparent
- Specific gravity: 3.28 – 3.46
- Optical properties: Isotropic
- Refractive index: n = 1.747 – 1.771

Danalite is an iron beryllium silicate sulfide mineral with formula: Fe^{2+}_{4}Be_{3}(SiO_{4})_{3}S.

It is a rare mineral which occurs in granites, tin bearing pegmatites, contact metamorphic skarns, gneisses and in hydrothermal deposits. It occurs in association with magnetite, garnet, fluorite, albite, cassiterite, pyrite, muscovite, arsenopyrite, quartz, and chlorite.

Danalite was first described in 1866 from a deposit in Essex County, Massachusetts and named for American mineralogist James Dwight Dana (1813–1895).

It has been found in Massachusetts, New Hampshire, Sierra County, New Mexico; Yavapai County, Arizona; Needlepoint Mountain, British Columbia; Walrus Island, James Bay, Quebec; Sweden; Czech republic; Cornwall, England; Imalka and Transbaikal, Russia; Kazakhstan; Somalia; Tasmania; Western Australia and Hiroshima Prefecture, Japan.
