= Gymnothorax pictus =

Conservation status
- Least Concern (IUCN 3.1)

Scientific classification
- Kingdom: Animalia
- Phylum: Chordata
- Class: Actinopterygii
- Order: Anguilliformes
- Family: Muraenidae
- Genus: Gymnothorax
- Species: G. pictus

Binomial name
- Gymnothorax pictus (Ahl, 1789)

Species of fish

Gymnothorax pictus, the painted moray, paintspotted moray or peppered moray, is a moray eel. The Chamorro name of the eel is títugi.

== Description ==
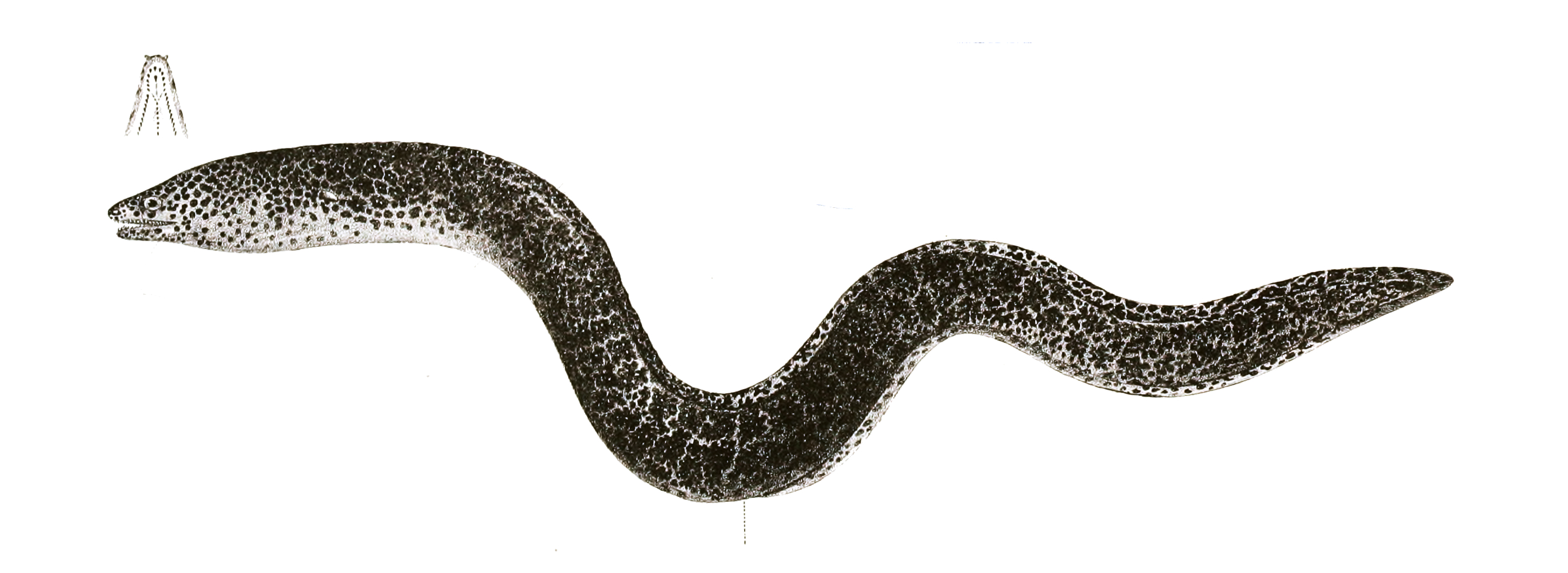

The species is pale with purplish speckles, which gather together with age. Young of the species have no spots or bars; they are pale purplish with white bellies. Its maximum length is 140 cm. The peppered moray eats small fish and crustaceans. G. pictus is similar to Gymnothorax griseus. While hunting for prey, they may be completely out of the water or may leap out of water. It is dangerous to eat because it is poisonous.

== Taxonomy ==
The peppered moray was named and described by Solander in an unpublished manuscript. Richardson said the fish might be Muraena siderea. Richardson later proved the fish was different by pointing out the difference in coloration. When the names were published as separate species, it was unknown if they were really different species. Kuep gave the species name as Sidera pantherina. Blecker later changed it to its current name. The reason why the name is still the same is because of all three people's work.

== Habitat ==
The peppered moray can commonly be found in tropical marine waters of the Indo-Pacific and from islands of the tropical Eastern Pacific. They can also be found in very shallow water on reef flats. Places where the species has been found include Suva Reef, the Fiji Islands, Clarion Island, and the Revillagigedo Islands.
