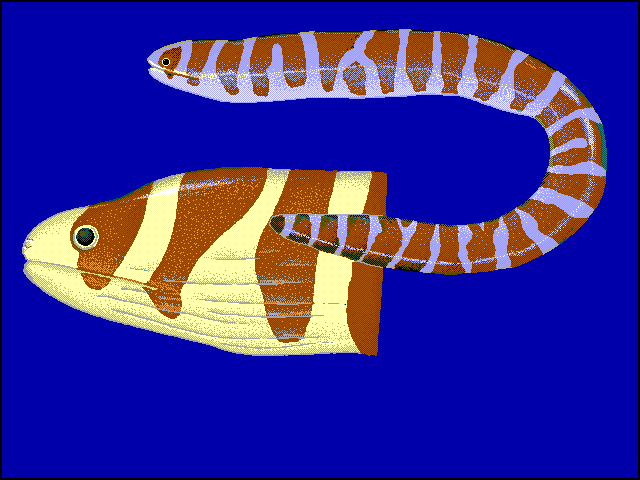

Conservation status
- Least Concern (IUCN 3.1)

Scientific classification
- Kingdom: Animalia
- Phylum: Chordata
- Class: Actinopterygii
- Order: Anguilliformes
- Family: Muraenidae
- Genus: Echidna
- Species: E. polyzona

Binomial name
- Echidna polyzona (J. Richardson, 1845)

Synonyms
- Muraena polyzona Richardson, 1845; Muraena fascigula Peters, 1855; Echidna fascigula (Peters, 1855); Poecilophis pikei Bliss, 1883; Echidna leihala Jenkins, 1903

= Barred moray =

Species of fish

The barred moray (Echidna polyzona), also known as the banded moray, the dark-banded eel, the girdled moray, the girdled reef eel, the many banded moray eel, the ringed moray, the ringed reef moray, the striped moray and the zebra eel,) is a moray eel of the family Muraenidae. It was described by John Richardson in 1845, originally under the genus Muraena. It is a marine, tropical eel which is known from the Indo-Pacific, including the Red Sea, East Africa, the Hawaiian Islands, the Marquesan Islands, the Tuamotus Islands, the Ryukyu Islands, and the Great Barrier Reef. It dwells at a depth range of 2 to 20 metres (6.6 to 65.6 ft), and leads a benthic lifestyle in reefs and shallow lagoons. Males can reach a maximum total length of 72.3 centimetres (28.5 in). It is sometimes confused with the Zebra moray (Gymnomuraena).

The barred moray's diet consists of shrimp such as Saron marmoratus, crabs, isopods, and polychaetes, which it feeds on during both day and night. It is of commercial interest to both subsistence fisheries and the aquarium trade.

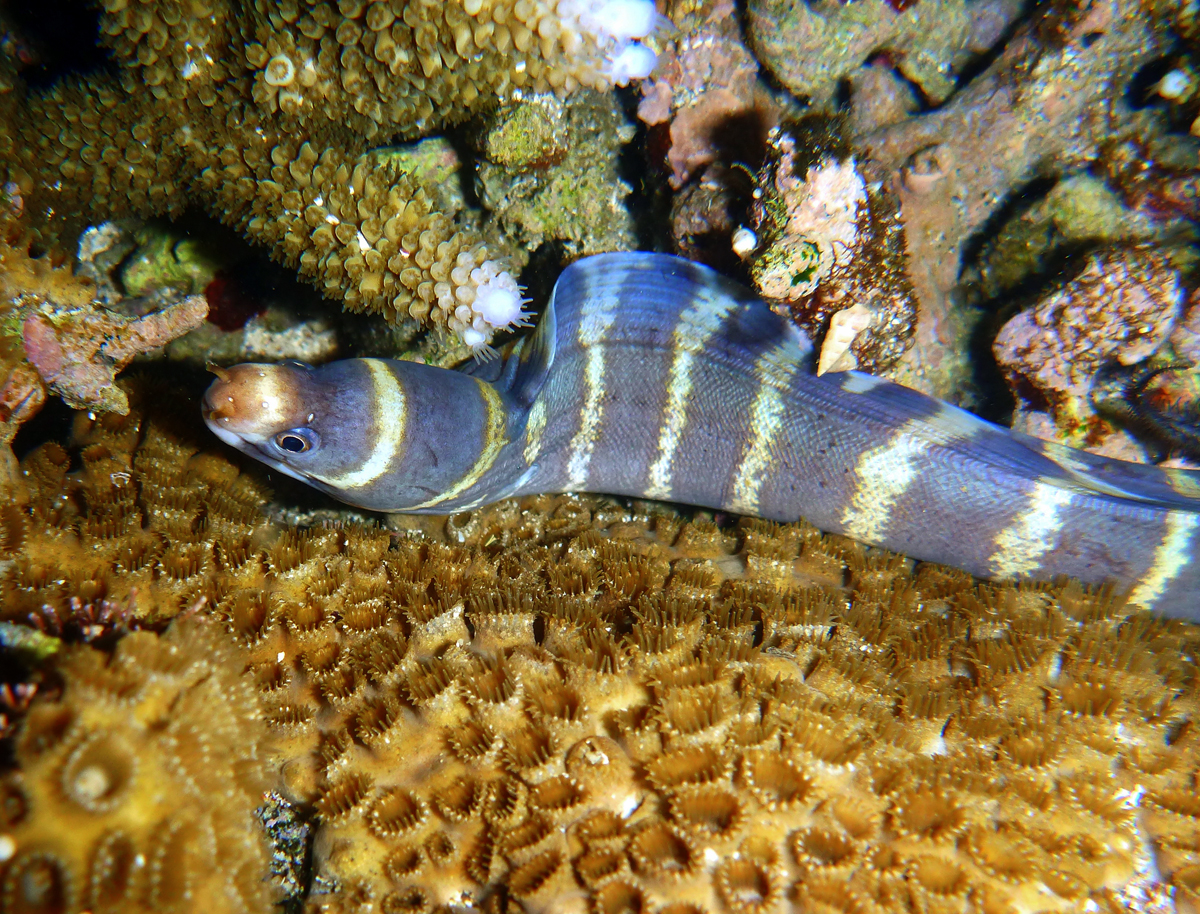
A barred moray
