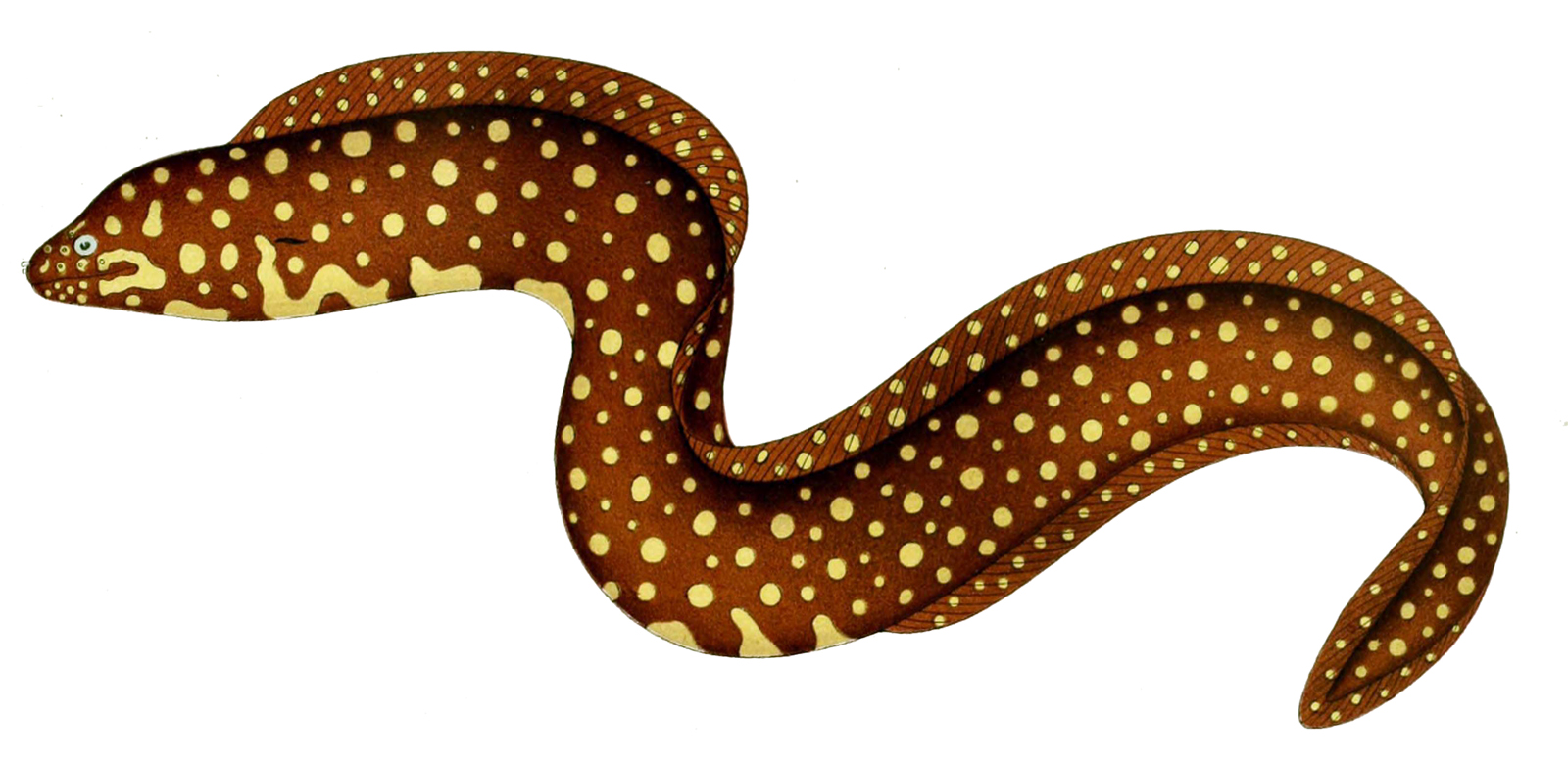

Scientific classification
- Domain: Eukaryota
- Kingdom: Animalia
- Phylum: Chordata
- Class: Actinopterygii
- Order: Anguilliformes
- Family: Muraenidae
- Genus: Echidna
- Species: E. xanthospilos

Binomial name
- Echidna xanthospilos (Bleeker, 1859)

= Echidna xanthospilos =

Species of fish

Echidna xanthospilos is a moray eel found in the western central Pacific Ocean, around Indonesia and Papua New Guinea. It was first named by Pieter Bleeker in 1859. Its common names include yellow-spotted moray and skeletor moray.
