= Oliver C. Farrington =

American geologist

Oliver Cummings Farrington
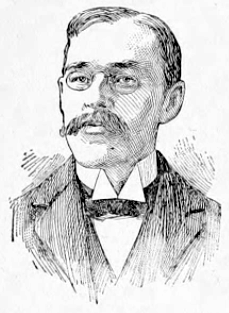
- Born: October 9, 1864; Brewer, Maine, USA
- Died: November 2, 1933 (aged 69); Chicago, Illinois, USA
- Resting place: Oak Hill Cemetery, Brewer, Maine, USA
- Known for: Meteorite classification

Oliver Cummings Farrington (October 9, 1864 – November 2, 1933) was an American geologist.

== Biography ==
Oliver C. Farrington was born at Brewer, Maine on October 9, 1864, and was educated at the University of Maine (B.S., 1881; M.S., 1888) and at Yale University (Ph.D., 1891), where he was tutor in 1890–91. Between 1882 and 1887 he taught science in various Maine academies, in 1893 he was an assistant in the United States National Museum, in 1894 he became the curator of geology at the Field Museum of Natural History, Chicago, and from 1894 to 1904 he was lecturer on mineralogy at the University of Chicago. He was a collaborator in mines and mineralogy at the Paris Exposition in 1900 and a member of the International Jury of Awards at St. Louis in 1904. He was the president of the American Association of Museums (now the American Alliance of Museums) in 1914–16.

He was elected in 1909 a Fellow of the American Association for the Advancement of Science (AAAS).

He died in Chicago on November 2, 1933.

== Works ==
Besides his magazine articles, he was author of:

- Observations of Popocatepetl and Ixtaccihuatl (1897) (See Popocatépetl and Iztaccíhuatl.)
- Meteorite Studies—I (1902); Meteorite Studies—II (1907); Meteorite Studies—III (1910)
- Gems and Gems Minerals (1903)
- Analyses of Iron Meteorites (1907) (See iron meteorite.)
- Analyses of Stone Meteorites (1911) (See meteorite classification.)

The mineral farringtonite, first found in the Springwater meteorite, is named in his honor.

== See also ==
- Glossary of meteoritics
- Roy, Sharat K.: 53. Memorial of Oliver Cummings Farrington, Proc. Geol. Soc. Amer., 1933, 193–210, 1 pl., June, 1934.
- Gems and Gemology, March–April 1934.
