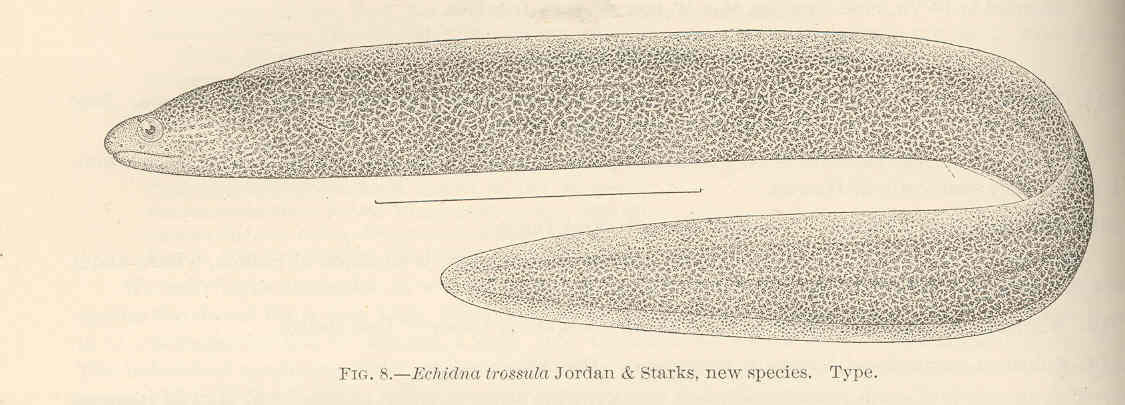

Scientific classification
- Domain: Eukaryota
- Kingdom: Animalia
- Phylum: Chordata
- Class: Actinopterygii
- Order: Anguilliformes
- Family: Muraenidae
- Genus: Echidna
- Species: E. delicatula

Binomial name
- Echidna delicatula (Kaup, 1856)

Synonyms
- Poecilophis delicatulus Kaup, 1856; Siderea delicatula (Kaup, 1856)

= Echidna delicatula =

Species of fish

Echidna delicatula, the mottled moray, also known as the fine-speckled moray, is a moray eel (family Muraenidae). It was described by Johann Jakob Kaup in 1856, originally under the genus Poecilophis. It is a marine, tropical eel which is known from the Indo-Pacific, including Sri Lanka, Samoa, and Japan. It inhabits coral reefs. It can reach a maximum total length of 65 centimetres (26 in).
