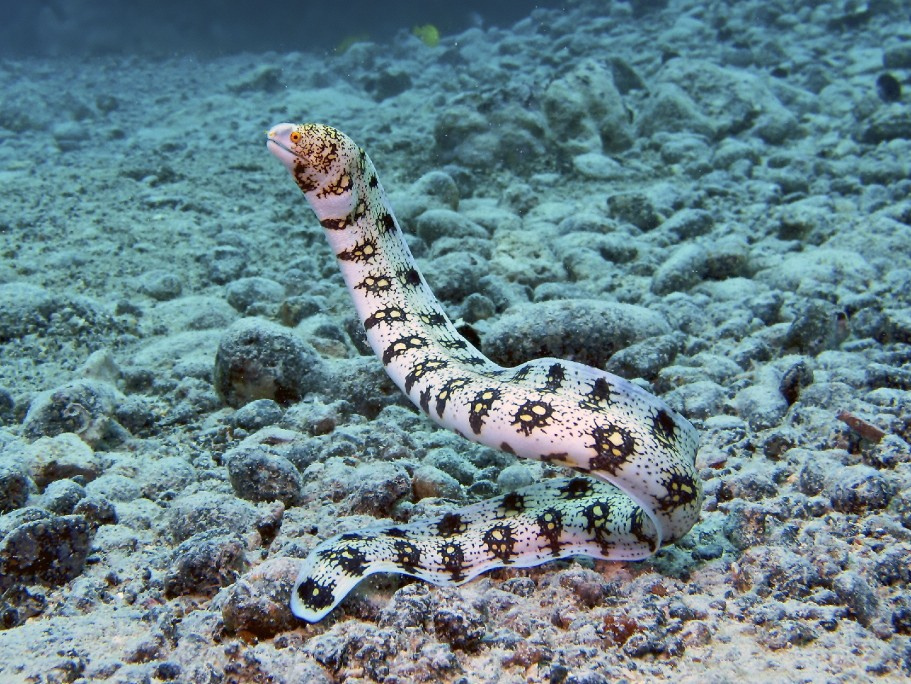
- Snowflake moray (E. nebulosa)

Scientific classification
- Domain: Eukaryota
- Kingdom: Animalia
- Phylum: Chordata
- Class: Actinopterygii
- Order: Anguilliformes
- Family: Muraenidae
- Subfamily: Muraeninae
- Genus: Echidna; J. R. Forster, 1788

Species
- See text.

Synonyms
- Megaderus Rafinesque, 1815; Molarii Richardson, 1848; Poecilophis Kaup, 1856; Leihala D. S. Jordan, 1925

= Echidna (fish) =

Genus of fishes

Echidna is a genus of moray eels in the family Muraenidae. Species in this genus currently do not form a monophyletic group.

== Description ==
Echidna species lack canine teeth.

== Diet ==
They generally eat crustaceans.

== Species ==
As of 2017, FishBase and WoRMS recognize the following eleven species in Echidna:

- Echidna amblyodon (Bleeker, 1856) (Sulawesi moray)
- Echidna catenata (Bloch, 1795) (chain moray)
- Echidna delicatula (Kaup, 1856) (mottled moray)
- Echidna leucotaenia L. P. Schultz, 1943 (whiteface moray)
- Echidna nebulosa (J. N. Ahl, 1789) (snowflake moray)
- Echidna nocturna (Cope, 1872) (freckled moray)
- Echidna peli (Kaup, 1856) (pebbletooth moray)
- Echidna polyzona (J. Richardson, 1845) (barred moray)
- Echidna rhodochilus Bleeker, 1863 (pink-lipped moray eel)
- Echidna unicolor L. P. Schultz, 1953 (unicolor moray)
- Echidna xanthospilos (Bleeker, 1859) (New Guinea moray)

In addition to the species listed above, the zebra moray (Gymnomuraena zebra) has sometimes been included in Echidna.
