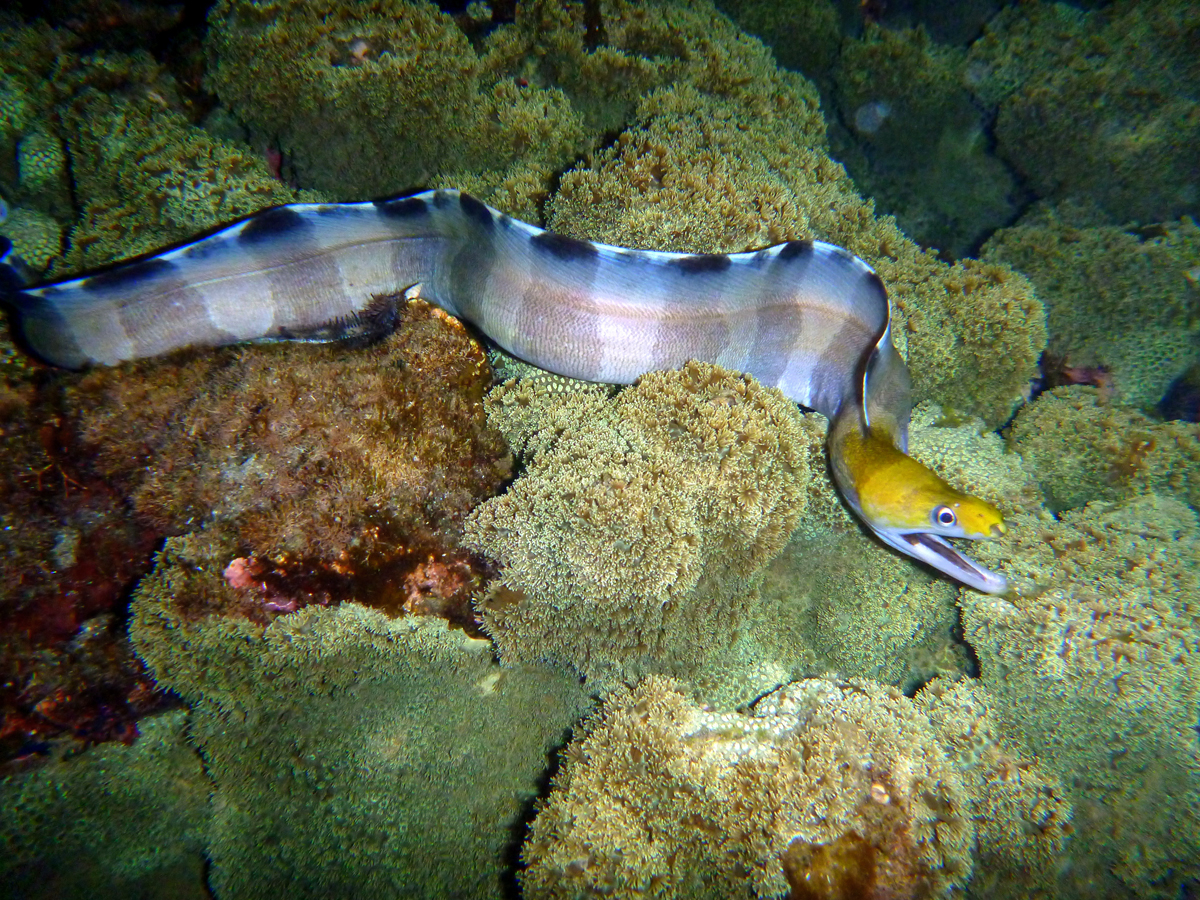

Conservation status
- Least Concern (IUCN 3.1)

Scientific classification
- Kingdom: Animalia
- Phylum: Chordata
- Class: Actinopterygii
- Order: Anguilliformes
- Family: Muraenidae
- Genus: Gymnothorax
- Species: G. rueppelliae

Binomial name
- Gymnothorax rueppelliae (McClelland, 1844)

Synonyms
- List: ? ruppelli McClelland, 1845; Dalophis rueppelliae McClelland, 1844; Gymnothorax leucacme Jenkins, 1903; Gymnothorax petelli (Bleeker, 1856); Gymnothorax rueppellii (McClelland, 1844); Gymnothorax ruppelliae (McClelland, 1844); Gymnothorax ruppellii (McClelland, 1844); Gymnothorax signifer Bliss, 1883; Gymnothorax waialuae Snyder, 1904; Lycodontis petelli (Bleeker, 1856); Lycodontis rueppelli (McClelland, 1844); Lycodontis rueppelliae (McClelland, 1844); Lycodontis ruppelli (McClelland, 1845); Muraena interrupta Kaup, 1856; Muraena nigrolineata Kaup, 1856; Muraena petelli Bleeker, 1856; Muraena ruppelli (McClelland, 1844); Sidera chlevastes Jordan & Gilbert, 1883

= Gymnothorax rueppelliae =

Species of fish

Gymnothorax rueppelliae, the banded moray, banded reef-eel, Rüppell's moray, Rüppell's moray eel, black barred eel, yellow-headed moray eel or yellow-headed moray, is a moray eel found in tropical coral reefs. Gymnothorax rueppelliae is a pale grey to greyish-brown moray with 16–21 dark bars on the body, a bright yellow head and a dark spot at the corner of the mouth. They differ from the Gymnothorax pikei, a close relative that lives Papua New Guinea. They have fewer vomerine teeth. They also reach a maximum length of 80 cm (31 in).

Its scientific name honors German naturalist and explorer Eduard Rüppell. The Hawaiian name puhi 'apo, meaning "to catch or grasp," was designated by Mary Kawena Pukui in 1978.

== Characteristics ==
This species has a pale grey to greyish-brown body with 16–21 dark bars and a bright yellow head with a dark spot at the corner of the mouth with vomerine teeth. The snout and front of the head are yellowish, while the body is marked by wide, encircling dark brown bands that fade as the eel ages. A distinguishing feature of G. rueppelliae is that its bands are regular and continuous around the body, extending onto the head as far as the snout.

== Distribution ==
Gymnothorax rueppelliae is distributed throughout the Pacific and Indian Oceans, with populations found in lagoon and coral reefs, from the Red Sea and East Africa to Hawaii, Tuamotu Archipelago, the Marquesas Islands, north of the Ryukyu Islands, and south of the Great Barrier Reef.

== Habitat ==
This species is nocturnal and primarily benthic, residing in clear waters of lagoons and seaward reefs at depths ranging from 1 to 40 m (3 ft 3 in to 131 ft 3 in), with reports of individuals inhabiting reefs as deep as 30 m (98 ft).

== Behavior ==
G. rueppelliae is known for its nervous and aggressive behavior, particularly when disturbed.

=== Diet ===
It is an active predator, mainly feeding on fish, crabs, and shrimp.

== Reproduction ==
Like other moray eels, Gymnothorax rueppelliae follows an oviparous reproductive strategy, meaning it lays eggs with little or no embryonic development occurring within the mother. The reproductive behavior of G. rueppelliae is believed to be influenced by water temperature, lunar cycles, and seasonal changes, similar to other moray eels. However, further research is needed to understand specific spawning sites and behaviors of this species in the wild.
