= Echidna rhodochilus =

Scientific classification
- Domain: Eukaryota
- Kingdom: Animalia
- Phylum: Chordata
- Class: Actinopterygii
- Order: Anguilliformes
- Family: Muraenidae
- Genus: Echidna
- Species: E. rhodochilus

Binomial name
- Echidna rhodochilus Bleeker, 1863

Species of fish

Echidna rhodochilus is a moray eel found in the Pacific and Indian oceans, around India and the Philippines. It was first named by Bleeker in 1863, and is commonly known as the pink-lipped moray eel.
