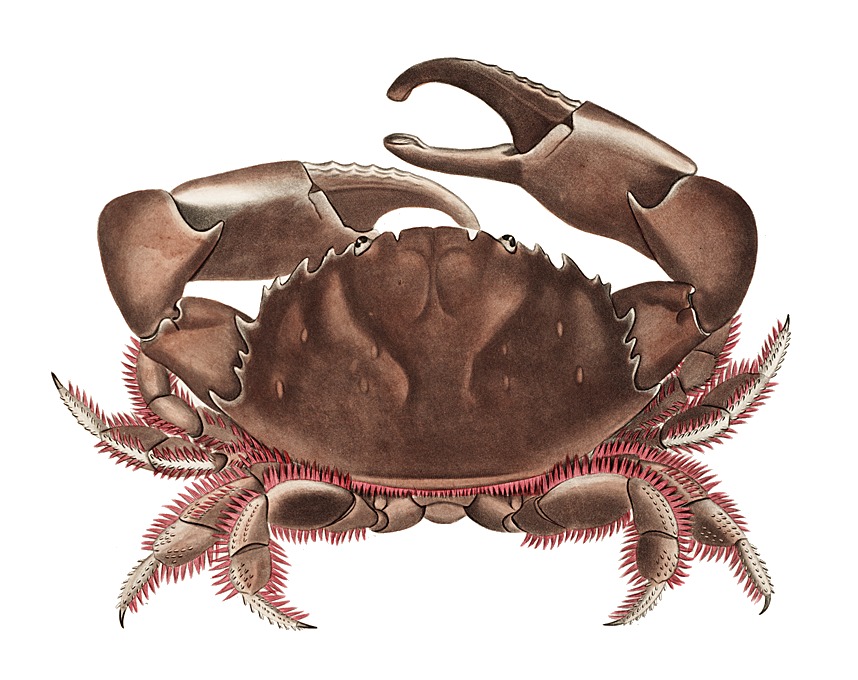
- Etisus dentatus

Scientific classification
- Domain: Eukaryota
- Kingdom: Animalia
- Phylum: Arthropoda
- Class: Malacostraca
- Order: Decapoda
- Suborder: Pleocyemata
- Infraorder: Brachyura
- Family: Xanthidae
- Subfamily: Etisinae
- Genus: Etisus; H. Milne-Edwards, 1834

Type species
- Cancer dentatus Herbst, 1785

= Etisus =

Genus of crabs

Etisus is a genus of crabs, containing the following extant species:

- Etisus albus (Ward, 1934)
- Etisus anaglyptus H. Milne-Edwards, 1834
- Etisus armatus (Ward, 1942)
- Etisus australis (Ward, 1936)
- Etisus bargibanti Crosnier, 1987
- Etisus bifrontalis (Edmondson, 1935)
- Etisus bulejiensis Tirmizi & Ghani, 1988
- Etisus demani Odhner, 1925
- Etisus dentatus (Herbst, 1785)
- Etisus electra (Herbst, 1801)
- Etisus frontalis (Dana, 1852)
- Etisus godeffroyi (A. Milne-Edwards, 1873)
- Etisus laboutei Crosnier, 1987
- Etisus laevimanus Randall, 1840
- Etisus maculatus (Stimpson, 1860)
- Etisus odhneri Takeda, 1971
- Etisus paulsoni (Klunzinger, 1913)
- Etisus punctatus Hombron & Jacquinot, 1846
- Etisus rhynchophorus A. Milne-Edwards, 1873
- Etisus sakaii Takeda & Miyaki, 1968
- Etisus splendidus Rathbun, 1906
- Etisus utilis Jacquinot in Jacquinot & Lucas, 1853
- Etisus villosus Clark & Galil, 1995
- Etisus zehntneri Serène, 1980
