= Jonas Niclas Ahl =

Swedish ichthyologist (1765–1817)

- Born: January 21, 1765; Hudiksvall, Sweden
- Died: August 27, 1817 (aged 52); Sala, Sweden
- Education: Uppsala University (PhD)
- Known for: Early descriptions of moray eels, including Echidna nebulosa and Gymnothorax pictus; description of the genus Ophichthus
- Scientific career
- Fields: Zoology, Botany

Jonas Nicolaus Ahl (in Latin), also written as Jonas Nicolas Ahl or Jonas Nicholaus Ahl (January 21, 1765 – August 27, 1817) was a Swedish zoologist and botanist.

== Biography ==
Jonas Nicolaus Ahl was born on January 21, 1765 in Hudiksvall, province of Hälsingland, Sweden. He studied at the Vasaskolan Gymnasium in Gävle before joining Uppsala University, where he earned his doctorate in 1789 under the supervision of Carl Peter Thunberg. He married Margareta Sophia Alenius on 11 March 1798 and died on 27 August 1817 in Sala, Sweden.

== Zoological legacy ==
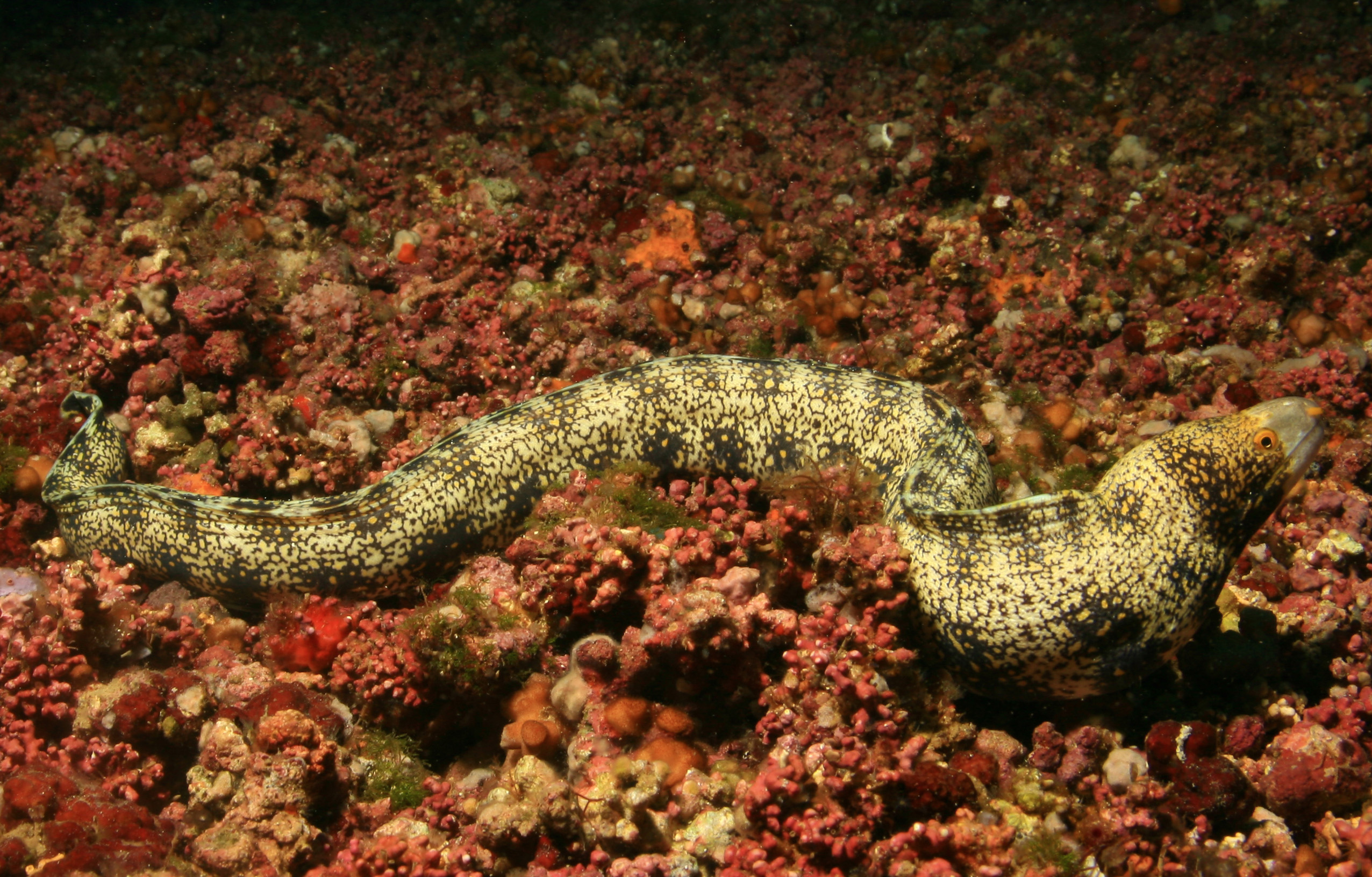
Echidna nebulosa (Ahl, 1789)

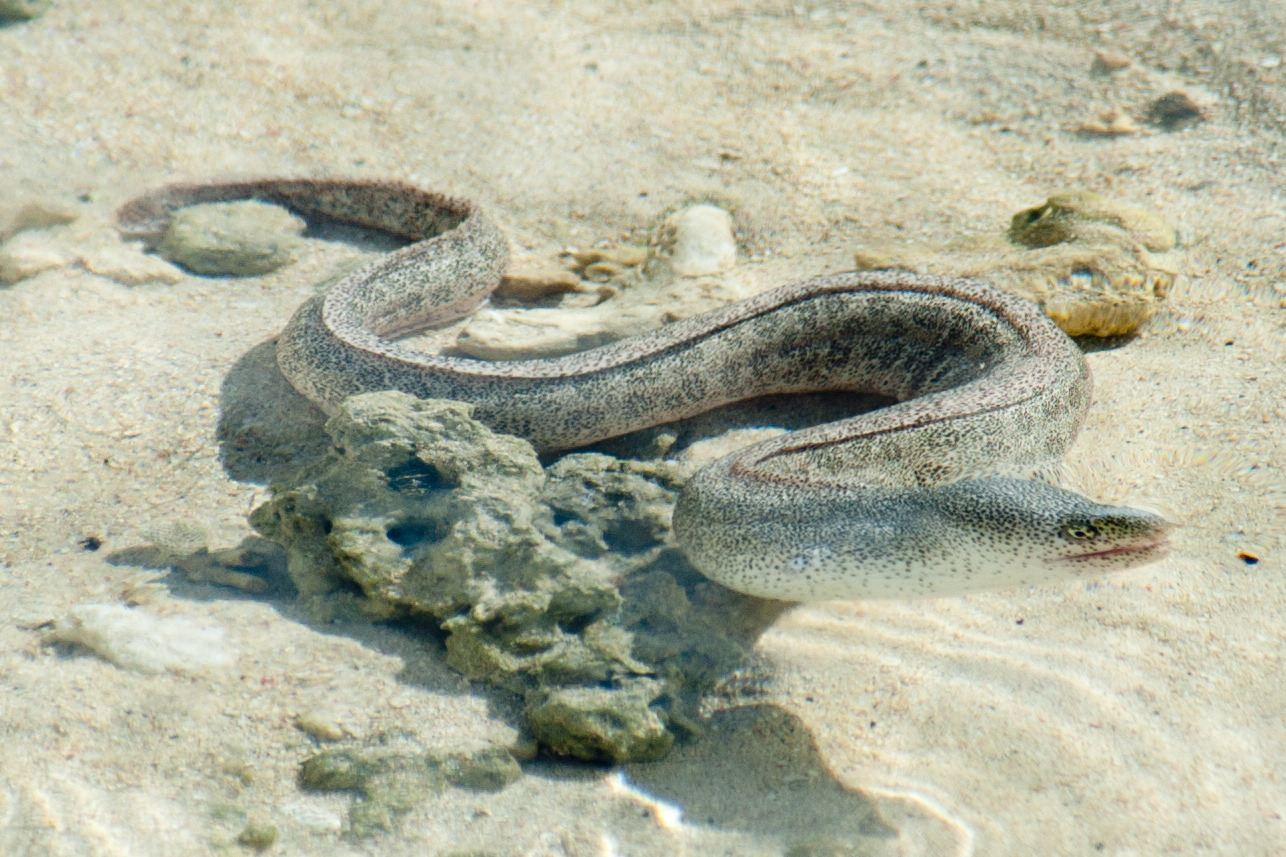
Gymnothorax pictus (Ahl, 1789)

In his 1789 dissertation, he described the genus Ophichthus as well as the species Echidna nebulosa (under the protonym Muraena nebulosa) and Gymnothorax pictus (under the protonym Muraena pica).

Although doubts have been raised about the authorship of this description, because at the time it was common practice for the thesis supervisor (in this case Carl Peter Thunberg) to write the dissertation, the initial description of the genus Ophichthus and the species Echidna nebulosa and Gymnothorax pictus remains attributed to Jonas Nicolaus Ahl.

== Selected publications ==
- 1789 – Specimen ichthyologicum de muraena et ophichtho.
- 1793 – Dissertatio de Benzoe.

Jonas Nicolaus Ahl was also the author of entomological plates.
