= Springwater meteorite =

Meteorite found in Canada

Springwater
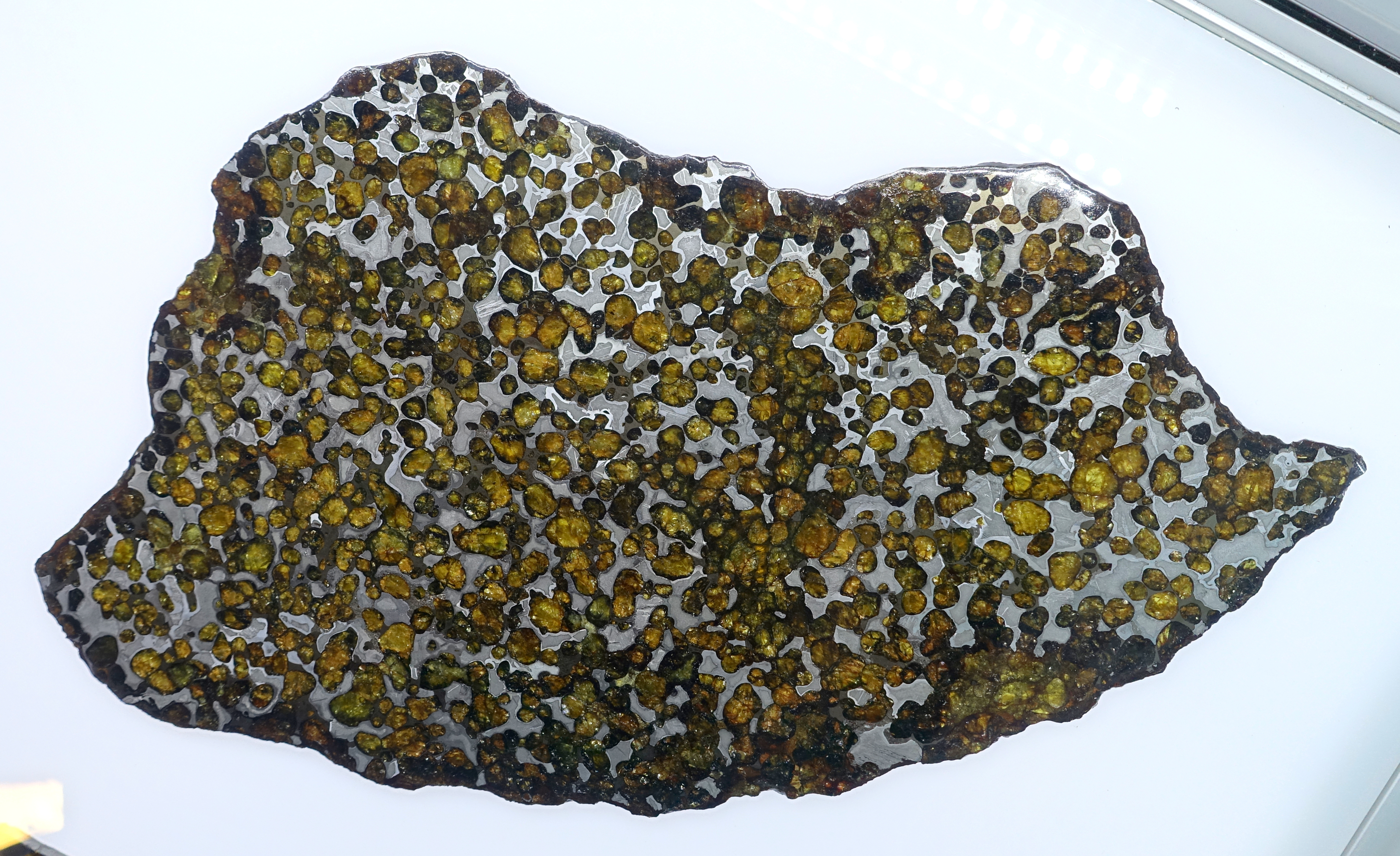
- Type: Stony iron
- Class: Pallasite
- Group
- Shock stage
- Weathering grade: W0
- Country: Canada
- Region: Saskatchewan, Canada
- Coordinates: 51°58′N 108°22′W
- Observed fall: No
- Found date: 1931
- TKW: 120 kilograms (260 lb)
- Strewn field: Yes
- Related media on Wikimedia Commons

The Springwater meteorite is a stony-iron pallasite, found near Springwater, Saskatchewan in 1931. At that time the find consisted of three large masses (38.6 kilograms (85 lb), 18.6 kilograms (41 lb) and 10.6 kilograms (23 lb). Other fragments have been found recently, including a 53 kilograms (117 lb) individual in 2009 that is now in the Royal Ontario Museum.

Thirty percent of the meteorite is the iron-rich metallic phases kamacite and taenite, with the rest mostly made up of olivine. There are minor amounts of other minerals, including several phosphates such as farringtonite (Mg_{3}(PO_{4})_{2}) and stanfieldite (Ca_{4}(Mg,Fe)_{5}(PO_{4})_{6}) and merrillite (a member of the whitlockite group).

== See also ==
- Glossary of meteoritics
- Meteorite find
