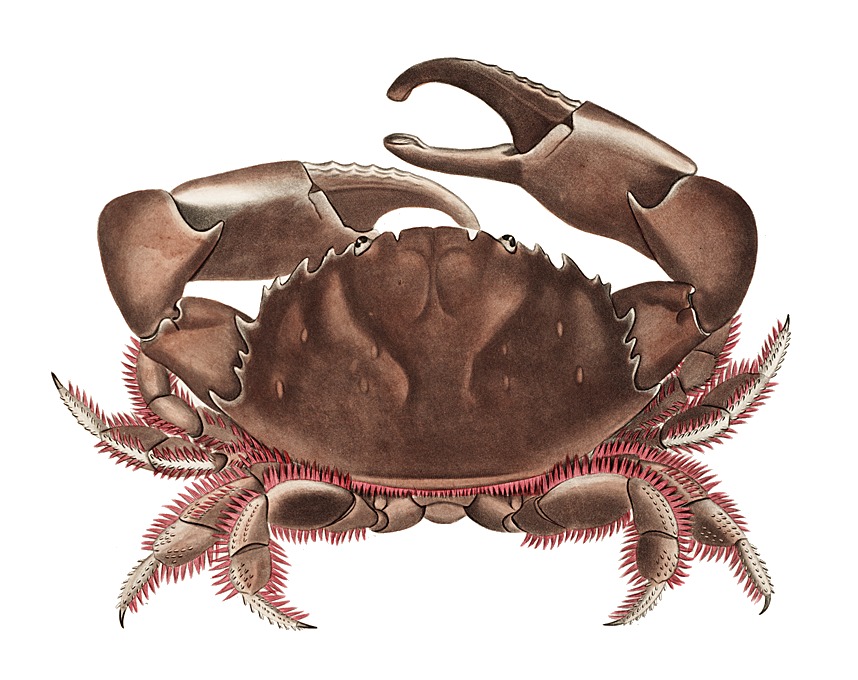

Scientific classification
- Domain: Eukaryota
- Kingdom: Animalia
- Phylum: Arthropoda
- Class: Malacostraca
- Order: Decapoda
- Suborder: Pleocyemata
- Infraorder: Brachyura
- Family: Xanthidae
- Genus: Etisus
- Species: E. dentatus

Binomial name
- Etisus dentatus (Herbst, 1785)

Synonyms
- Cancer dentatus Herbst, 1785

= Etisus dentatus =

Species of crab

Etisus dentatus is a species of crab that lives in the Indo-Pacific, including the Red Sea, South Africa, Madagascar, Mauritius, the Seychelles, India, the Andaman Islands, Japan, Taiwan, China, the Balabac Strait, the Torres Strait, New Caledonia, Fiji, Samoa, Tahiti and the Hawaiian Islands.
