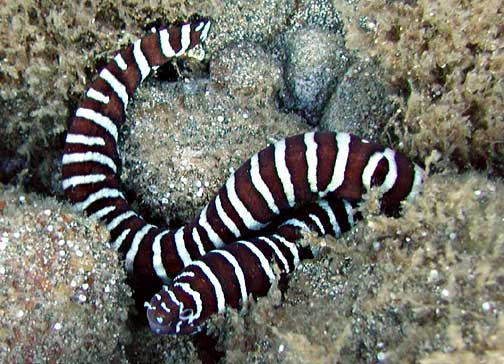

Conservation status
- Least Concern (IUCN 3.1)

Scientific classification
- Kingdom: Animalia
- Phylum: Chordata
- Class: Actinopterygii
- Division: Teleostei
- Order: Anguilliformes
- Family: Muraenidae
- Subfamily: Muraeninae
- Genus: Gymnomuraena; Lacépède, 1803
- Species: G. zebra

Binomial name
- Gymnomuraena zebra (G. Shaw, 1797)

Synonyms
- Echidna zebra

= Zebra moray =

Species of fish

The zebra moray (Gymnomuraena zebra) is a species of marine fish in the family Muraenidae. It is the only member of the genus Gymnomuraena, though it sometimes has been included in Echidna instead.

== Description ==
The zebra moray is considered as a medium-sized fish even if it can reach a maximum length of 150 cm. However, the average size commonly observed is more of the order of 50 cm. It is densely banded dark and whitish, giving rise to its common name. Its snout is round and short.

== Distribution and habitat ==
The zebra moray is widespread throughout the Indo-Pacific area from eastern coast of Africa until western coast of the Americas, including the Red Sea, Hawaii and Galápagos.

The zebra moray is a benthic fish, its favorite habitat corresponds to the rocky or coral reef on coastal shallow water up to 40 meters deep.

== Biology ==
Gymnomuraena zebra has a nocturnal activity and actively hunt its prey. Unlike most other moray eels, it feeds exclusively on crustaceans (with a preference for Etisus crabs that have claws rich in pulp), sea urchins (like Echinometra mathaei, not too spiny and full in eggs) and mollusks.
