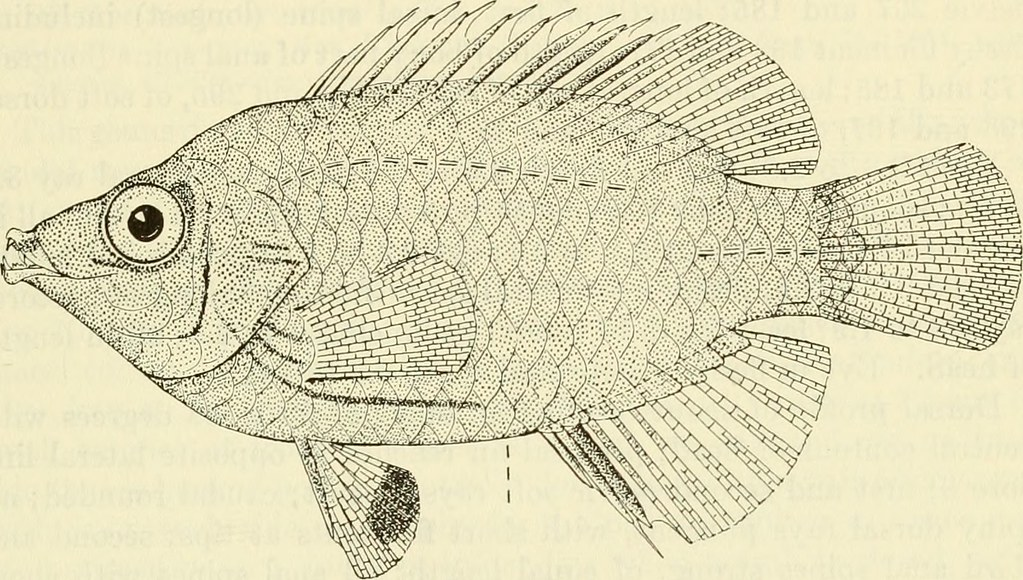

Conservation status
- Least Concern (IUCN 3.1)

Scientific classification
- Kingdom: Animalia
- Phylum: Chordata
- Class: Actinopterygii
- Division: Teleostei
- Order: Labriformes
- Family: Labridae
- Subfamily: Cirrhilabrinae
- Genus: Pseudocheilinops; L. P. Schultz, 1960
- Species: P. ataenia

Binomial name
- Pseudocheilinops ataenia L. P. Schultz, 1960

= Pelvic-spot wrasse =

Species of fish

The pelvic-spot wrasse (Pseudocheilinops ataenia), also known as the midget wrasse or pink-streaked wrasse, is a species of wrasse native to tropical waters of the western Pacific Ocean. It can be found on coral reefs in areas with little wave action at depths from 5 to 15 m (16 to 49 ft). This species grows to 6.5 cm (2.6 in) in total length. Pseudocheilinops ataenia is the only known member of its genus.
