= Peppered moray =

Peppered moray can refer to either of these species of fish:

- Gymnothorax griseus
- Gymnothorax pictus
- Uropterygius polystictus
