= Uropterygius macrocephalus =

Conservation status
- Least Concern (IUCN 3.1)

Scientific classification
- Kingdom: Animalia
- Phylum: Chordata
- Class: Actinopterygii
- Order: Anguilliformes
- Family: Muraenidae
- Genus: Uropterygius
- Species: U. macrocephalus

Binomial name
- Uropterygius macrocephalus Bleeker, 1864

Synonyms
- Uropterygius makatei Gosline, 1958

Species of fish

Uropterygius macrocephalus is a moray eel found in coral reefs in the Pacific and Indian Oceans. It is commonly known as the needle-tooth moray, large-headed snake moray, largehead snake moray, largehead moray, longhead moray, or the snowflake eel. It is used sometimes in aquariums.
