= Waite's pipefish =

Scientific classification
- Kingdom: Animalia
- Phylum: Chordata
- Class: Actinopterygii
- Order: Syngnathiformes
- Family: Syngnathidae
- Genus: Corythoichthys
- Species: C. waitei

Binomial name
- Corythoichthys waitei Jordan & Seale, 1906

Species of fish

Waite's pipefish (Corythoichthys waitei) is a species of Indo-Pacific pipefish from the family Syngnathidae which is found from the Philippines east to Samoa, south to Papua New Guinea. It was previously considered to be a synonym of Corythoichthys intestinalis but is now considered to be a valid species by many authorities.

== Etymology ==
The specific name honours the English ichthyologist Edgar Ravenswood Waite (1866-1928).
