= Hypostomus pospisili =

Scientific classification
- Kingdom: Animalia
- Phylum: Chordata
- Class: Actinopterygii
- Order: Siluriformes
- Family: Loricariidae
- Genus: Hypostomus
- Species: H. pospisili

Binomial name
- Hypostomus pospisili (Schultz, 1944)

Synonyms
- Cochliodon pospisili

Species of catfish

Hypostomus pospisili is a species of catfish in the family Loricariidae. It is native to South America, where it is known only from Venezuela. The species is believed to be a facultative air-breather. A 2003 taxonomic review conducted by Jonathan W. Armbruster of Auburn University listed Hypostomus pospisili as a synonym of Hypostomus hondae, although multiple sources recognize H. pospisili as a distinct species.
