= Uropterygius fuscoguttatus =

Conservation status
- Least Concern (IUCN 3.1)

Scientific classification
- Kingdom: Animalia
- Phylum: Chordata
- Class: Actinopterygii
- Order: Anguilliformes
- Family: Muraenidae
- Genus: Uropterygius
- Species: U. fuscoguttatus

Binomial name
- Uropterygius fuscoguttatus L. P. Schultz, 1953

Species of fish

Uropterygius fuscoguttatus is a moray eel found in coral reefs in the Pacific and Indian Oceans. It is commonly known as the brown spotted snake moray, brown snake moray, or the finless moray. It is mostly dark brown in colour, with darker brown spots approaching the tail.
