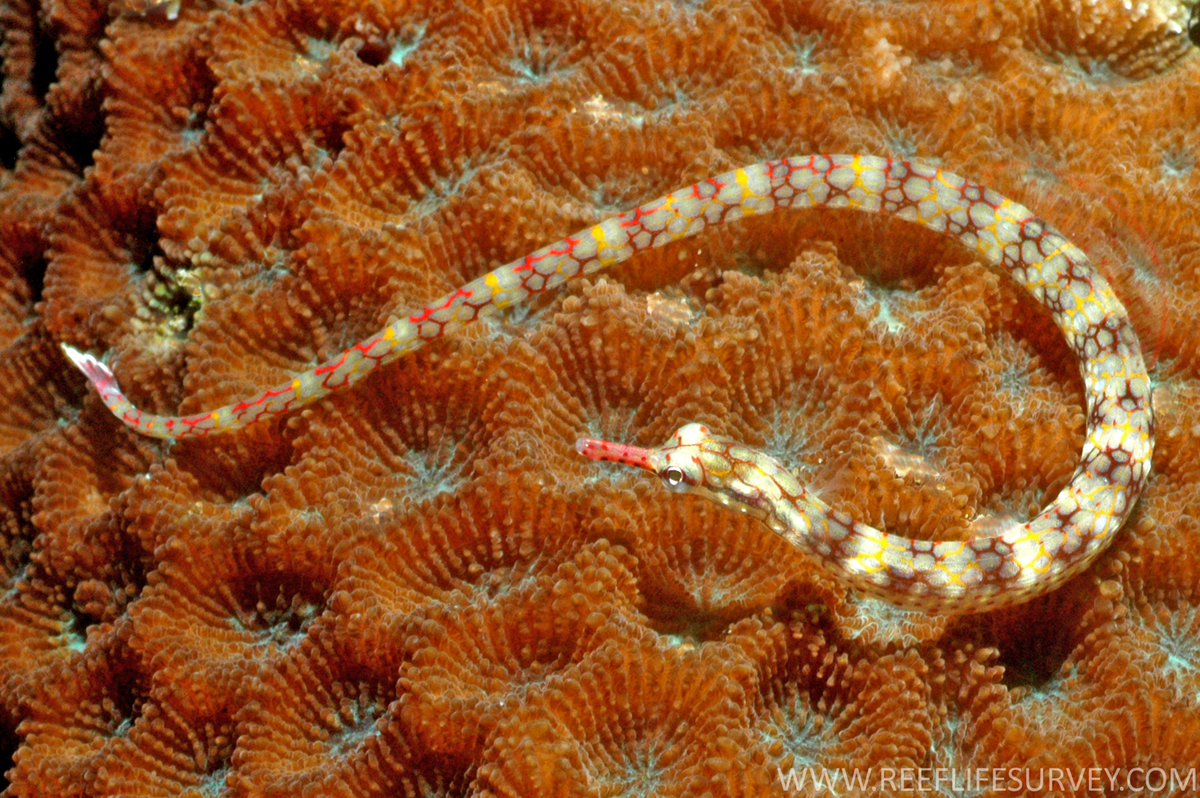
- Banda Aceh, Indonesia

Scientific classification
- Kingdom: Animalia
- Phylum: Chordata
- Class: Actinopterygii
- Division: Teleostei
- Order: Syngnathiformes
- Family: Syngnathidae
- Genus: Corythoichthys
- Species: C. conspicillatus

Binomial name
- Corythoichthys conspicillatus (Jenyns, 1842)

Synonyms
- Syngnathus conspicillatus Jenyns, 1842

= Corythoichthys conspicillatus =

Species of fish

Corythoichthys conspicillatus, the reticulate pipefish, is a species of pipefish from the family Syngnathidae.

== Taxonomy ==
This species is often confused with Corythoichthys flavofasciatus and the two were considered conspecific by some authorities but it is now widely accepted as a valid species with C. flavofasciatus being restricted to the Red Sea.

== Distribution ==
This species is widespread in the tropical Indo-Pacific, from the Red Sea to French Polynesia.

== Description ==
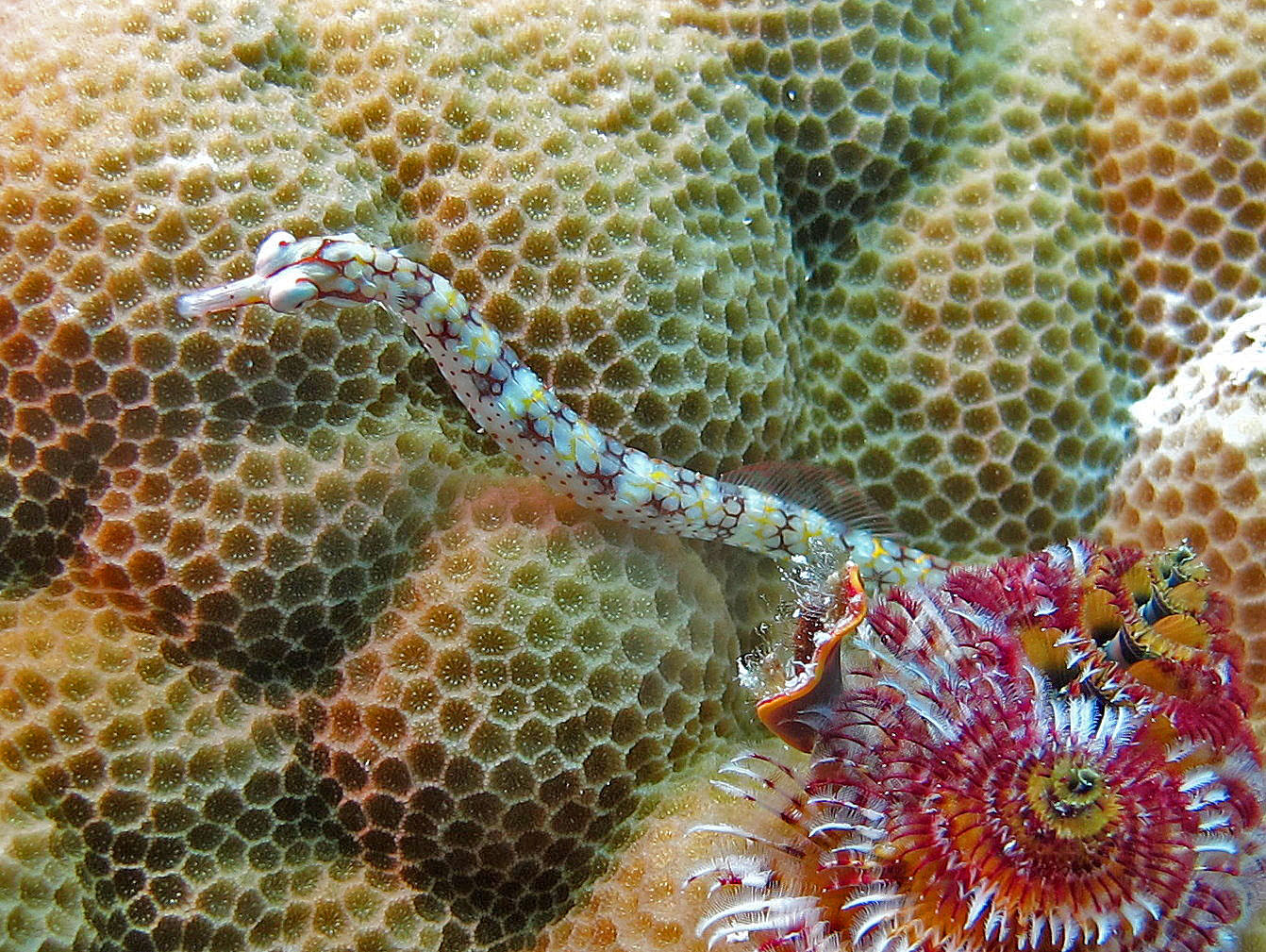
Corythoichthys conspicillatus from French Polynesia

Corythoichthys conspicillatus can grow to a total length of 180 millimetres (7.1 in). These pipefishes have reddish to reddish-brown and yellow bands on their body which have a reticulated pattern of lines superimposed on them, there are red spots on the snout, and the tail is pink to reddish with a white margin. The males have a bluish-black blotch around their anus which becomes more intense in colour during courtship.

== Biology and habitat ==
Corythoichthys conspicillatus can be found in seagrass beds or in sandy and rubble areas on sheltered reefs at depths of 1–25 metres (3.3–82.0 ft). It is normally seen in pairs or small groups.
