= Uropterygius xenodontus =

Conservation status
- Least Concern (IUCN 3.1)

Scientific classification
- Kingdom: Animalia
- Phylum: Chordata
- Class: Actinopterygii
- Order: Anguilliformes
- Family: Muraenidae
- Genus: Uropterygius
- Species: U. xenodontus

Binomial name
- Uropterygius xenodontus McCosker & D. G. Smith, 1997

Species of moray eel

Uropterygius xenodontus is a moray eel found in coral reefs in the Pacific Ocean. It is commonly known as the black snake moray, strange-toothed snake moray, or the wedge-tooth snake moray.
