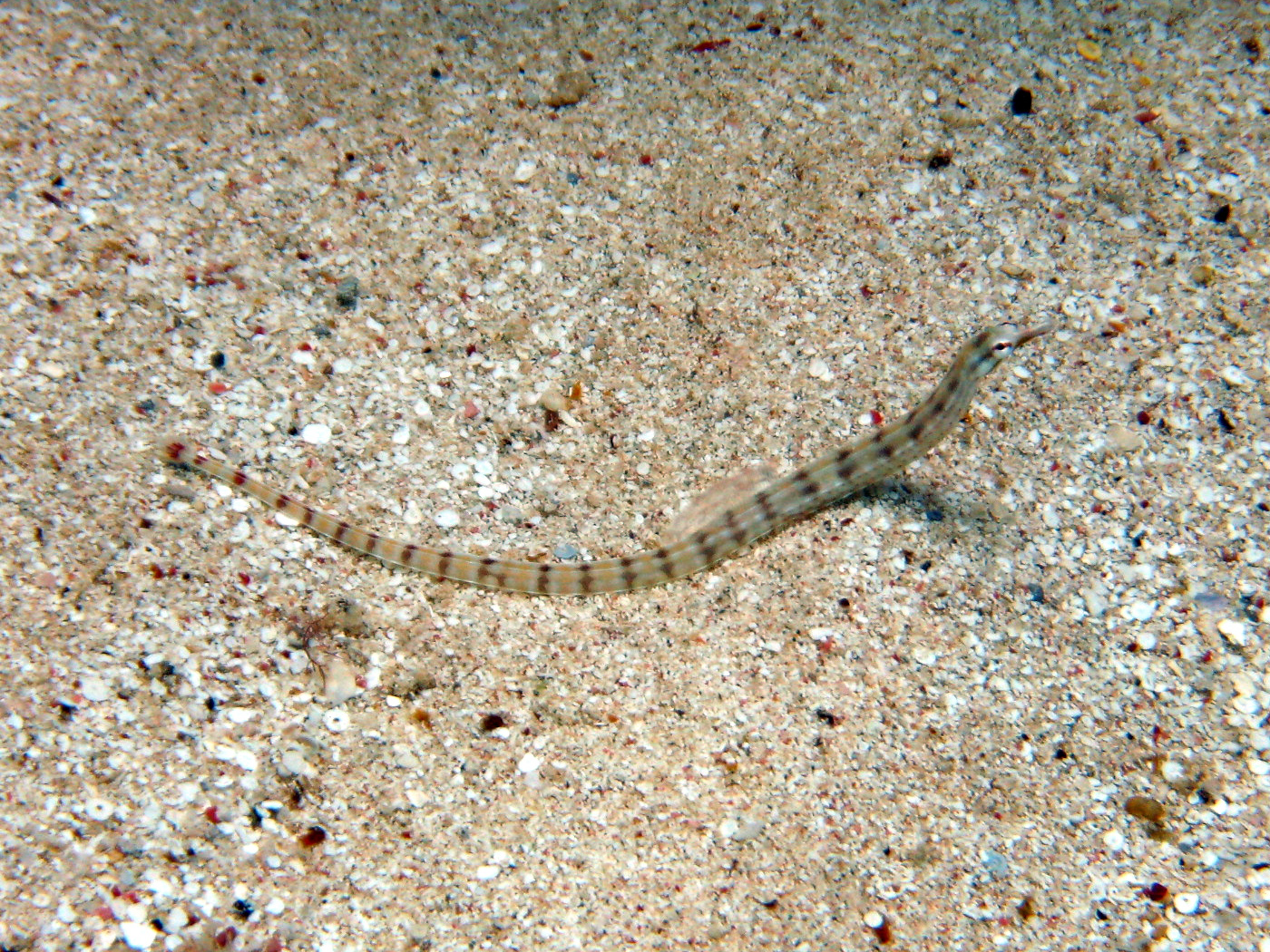
- Al Qusair, Egypt

Conservation status
- Least Concern (IUCN 3.1)

Scientific classification
- Kingdom: Animalia
- Phylum: Chordata
- Class: Actinopterygii
- Order: Syngnathiformes
- Family: Syngnathidae
- Genus: Corythoichthys
- Species: C. flavofasciatus

Binomial name
- Corythoichthys flavofasciatus (Rüppell, 1838)

Synonyms
- Syngnathus flavofasciatus Rüppell, 1838; Corythoichthys fasciatus (Gray, 1830); Corythoichthys sealei Jordan & Starks, 1906; Corythoichthys serrulifer Fowler, 1938

= Corythoichthys flavofasciatus =

Species of fish

Corythoichthys flavofasciatus, known commonly as the network pipefish, reticulate pipefish and yellow-banded pipefish, is a species of marine fish in the family Syngnathidae.

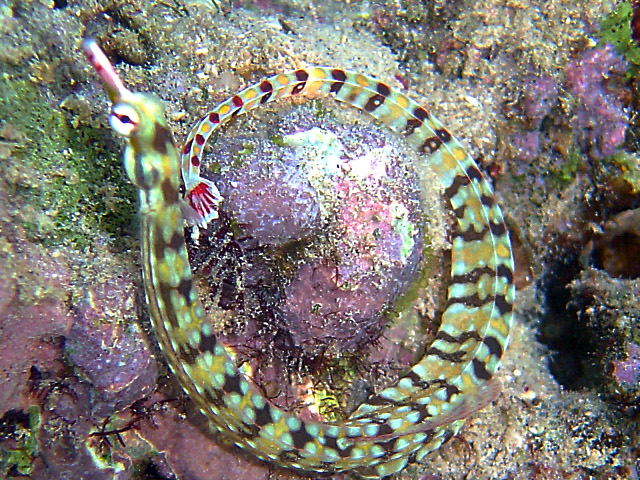
Corythoichthys flavofasciatus, Egypt

== Distribution and habitat ==
This species can be found from the Red Sea and Eastern Africa to the Tuamotu, the Ryukyu Islands, northern Australia and the Austral Islands. It lives in tropical climate and it is associated with lagoons and coral reefs at depths from the low tide line to 25 m.

== Description ==
Corythoichthys flavofasciatus can reach a length of about 12 centimetres (4.7 in) in males. These fishes have 26-36 dorsal soft rays. Body has yellow and brown stripes, while the snout is red. Males develop orange stripes and brilliant light blue spots. This species is quite similar to Corythoichthys conspicillatus.

== Biology ==
This species is ovoviviparous. These fishes are probably monogamous and are usually found in pairs. The male carries the eggs in a ventral pouch, which is below the tail. Hatching time usually lasts 10–12 days. These fishes feed on small invertebrates especially copepods, but also small isopods and ostracods. In French Polynesia it is predated by Epinephelus merra.

== Taxonomy ==
Some authorities consider that Corythoichthys flavofasciatus is a species which is restricted to the Red Sea and that the species found in the remainder of the Indo-Pacific is Corythoichthys conspicillatus.

== Bibliography ==
- Fenner, Robert M.: The Conscientious Marine Aquarist. Neptune City,: T.F.H. Publications, 2001.
- Helfman, G., B. Collette y D. Facey: The diversity of fishes. Blackwell Science, Malden, Massachusetts, 1997.
- Hoese, D.F. 1986:. A M.M. Smith y P.C. Heemstra (eds.) Smiths' sea fishes. Springer-Verlag, Berlin.
- Moyle, P. and J. Cech.: Fishes: An Introduction to Ichthyology, 4th. ed., Upper Saddle River, New jersey: Prentice-Hall.
- Nelson, J.: Fishes of the World, 3rd. ed. New York: John Wiley and Sons..
- Wheeler, A.: The World Encyclopedia of Fishes, 2nd. Ed. London: Macdonald.
