= Uropterygius wheeleri =

Conservation status
- Least Concern (IUCN 3.1)

Scientific classification
- Kingdom: Animalia
- Phylum: Chordata
- Class: Actinopterygii
- Order: Anguilliformes
- Family: Muraenidae
- Genus: Uropterygius
- Species: U. wheeleri

Binomial name
- Uropterygius wheeleri Blache, 1967

Species of fish

Uropterygius wheeleri is a moray eel found in shallow waters in the eastern Atlantic Ocean, around Cape Verde, Senago, and islands in the Bay of Biafra.
