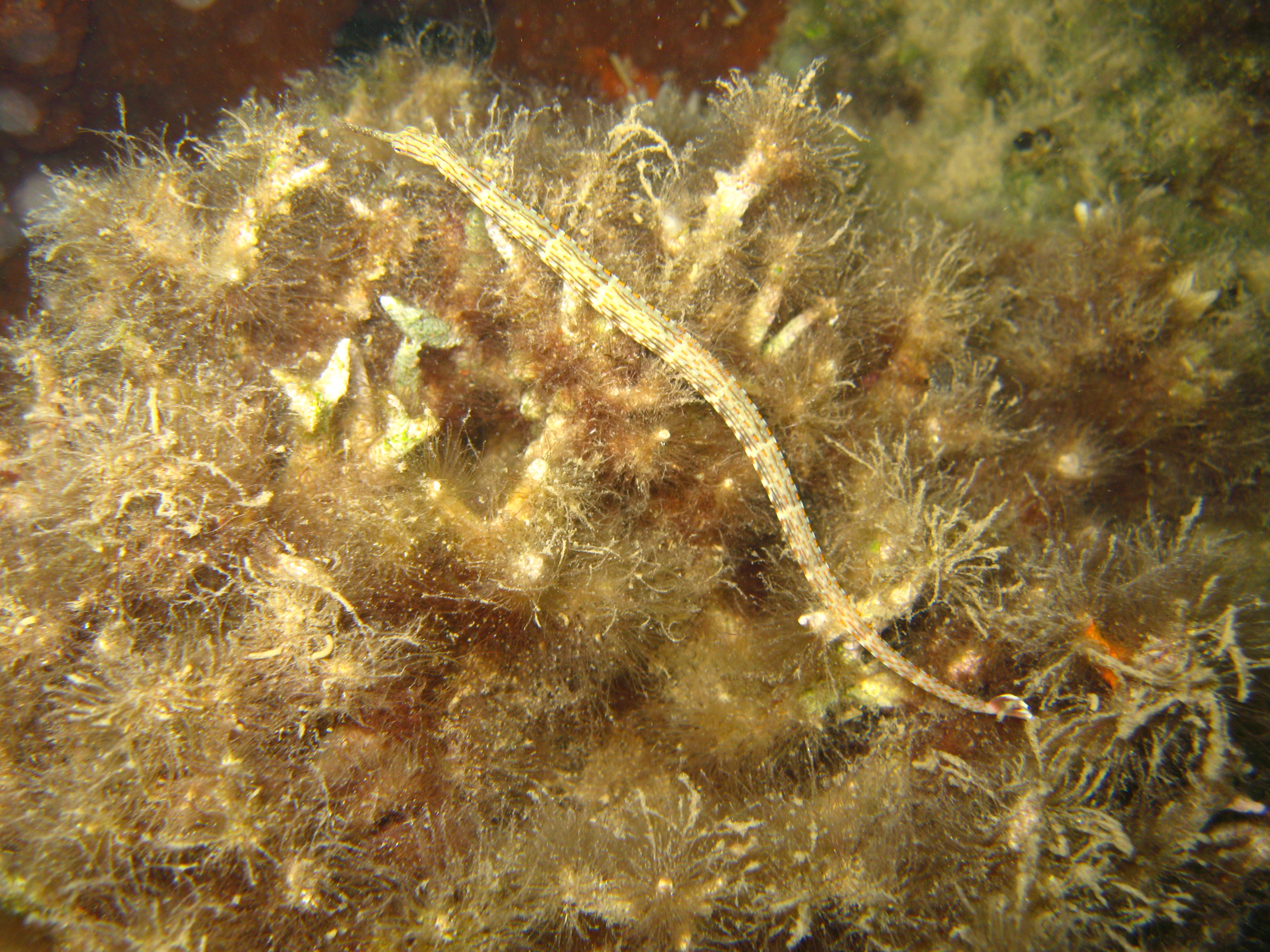

Conservation status
- Least Concern (IUCN 3.1)

Scientific classification
- Kingdom: Animalia
- Phylum: Chordata
- Class: Actinopterygii
- Order: Syngnathiformes
- Family: Syngnathidae
- Genus: Corythoichthys
- Species: C. ocellatus

Binomial name
- Corythoichthys ocellatus Herald, 1953

= Corythoichthys ocellatus =

Species of fish

Corythoichthys ocellatus, the ocellated pipefish or orange-spotted pipefish, is a marine pipefish found in the western Pacific Ocean. Belonging to the family Syngnathidae, it grows up to 10 cm long, and is found in the first 12 m of the warm tropical seas off the coast of Australia. Ovoviviparous, the male carries the eggs in a brood pouch found under the tail.
