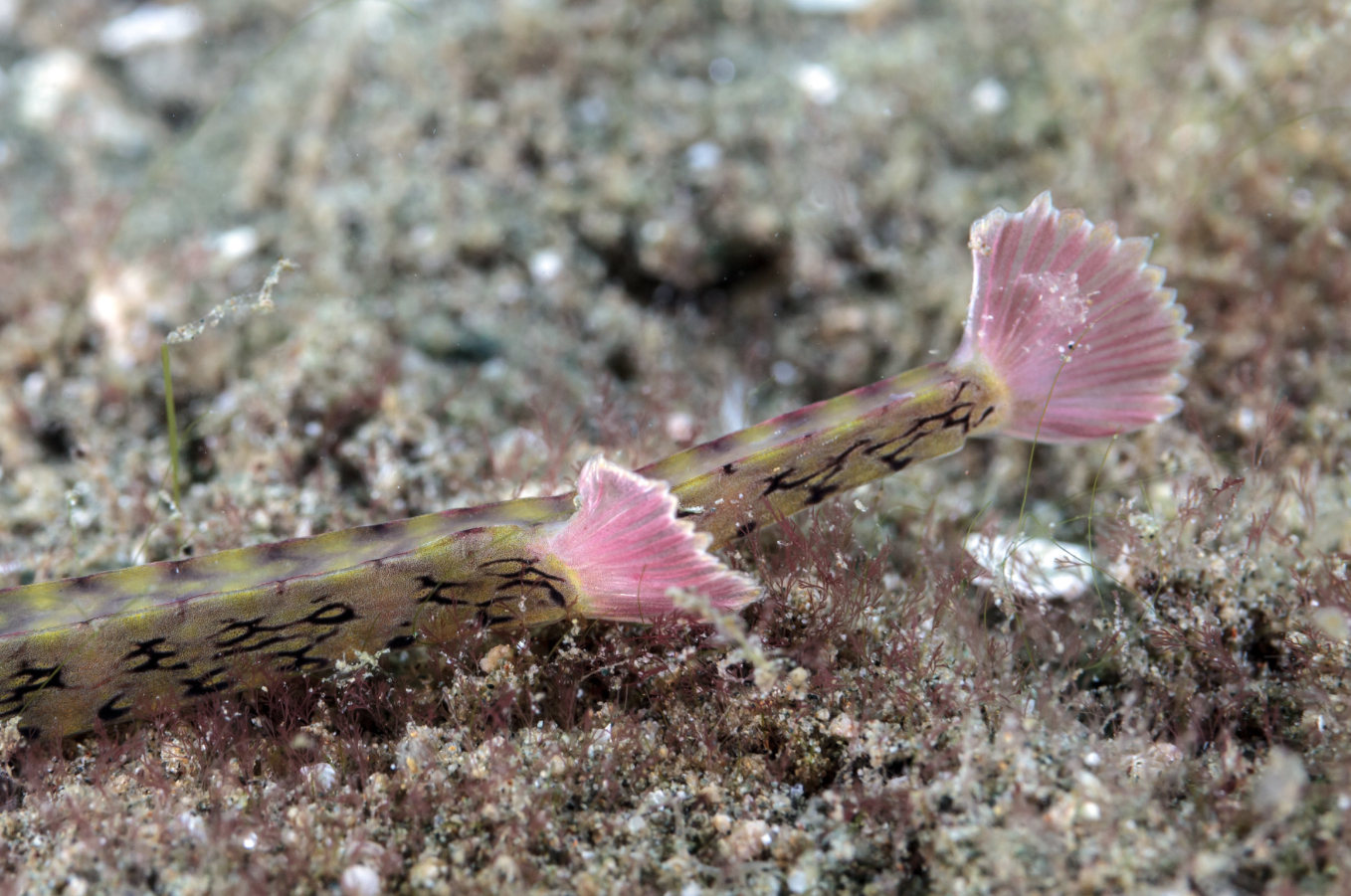
- Genetic double tail (Corythoichthys polynotatus)

Conservation status
- Least Concern (IUCN 3.1)

Scientific classification
- Kingdom: Animalia
- Phylum: Chordata
- Class: Actinopterygii
- Order: Syngnathiformes
- Family: Syngnathidae
- Genus: Corythoichthys
- Species: C. polynotatus

Binomial name
- Corythoichthys polynotatus C. E. Dawson, 1977

= Corythoichthys polynotatus =

Species of fish

Corythoichthys polynotatus, known commonly as the many-spotted pipefish or yellow-spotted pipefish, is a species of marine fish in the family Syngnathidae.

The many-spotted pipefish is widespread throughout the tropical waters of the central Indo-Pacific region, from Indonesia to the Philippines. It occurs mainly in shallow rubble lagoons among algae and seagrasses; it is frequently recorded in the intertidal zone and is normally found in only a few metres depth. Like other pipefish this species is ovoviviparous and the male bears the fertilised eggs in a brood pouch located under his tail

The many-spotted pipefish reaches a maximum total length of 16 centimetres (6.3 in) length.
