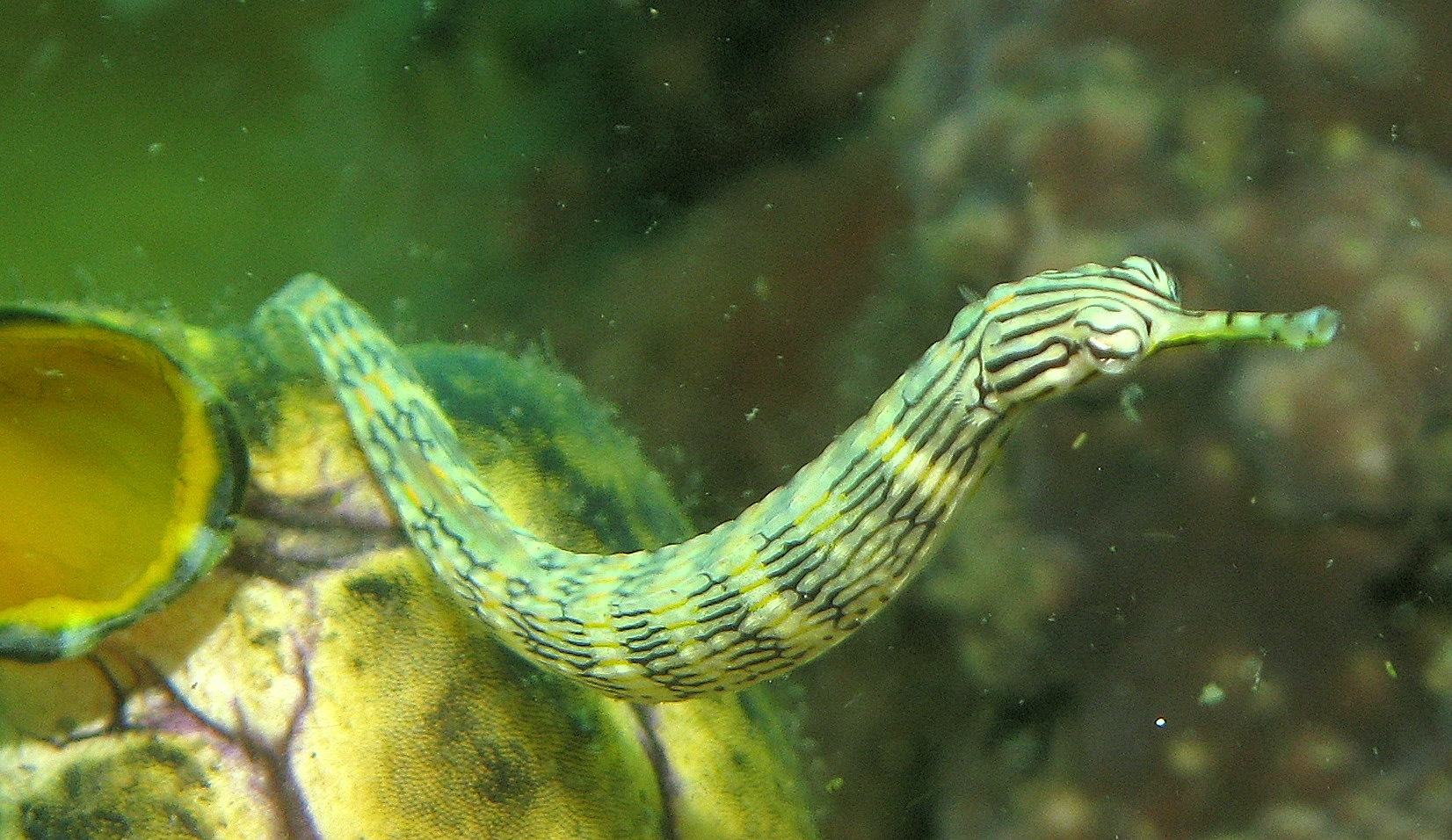

Conservation status
- Least Concern (IUCN 3.1)

Scientific classification
- Kingdom: Animalia
- Phylum: Chordata
- Class: Actinopterygii
- Order: Syngnathiformes
- Family: Syngnathidae
- Genus: Corythoichthys
- Species: C. haematopterus

Binomial name
- Corythoichthys haematopterus (Bleeker, 1851)

Synonyms
- Corythroichthys elerae Evermann & Seale, 1907; Corythroichthys isigakius Jordan & Snyder, 1901; Ichthyocampus papuensis Sauvage, 1880; Syngnathus crenulatus Weber, 1913; Syngnathus haematopterus Bleeker, 1851

= Messmate pipefish =

Species of fish

The messmate pipefish (Corythoichthys haematopterus) is a species of marine fish in the family Syngnathidae. It is widespread throughout the tropical waters of the Indo-Pacific region, from the eastern coast of Africa to the Vanuatu Islands. It occasionally makes its way into the aquarium trade where it is known as the dragonfaced pipefish. Other common names are bloodspot pipefish, reef pipefish, reeftop pipefish and yellow-streaked pipefish.

The messmate pipefish exhibits biofluorescence, that is, when illuminated by blue or ultraviolet light, it re-emits it as yellow, and appears differently than under white light illumination. Biofluorescence may assist in intraspecific communication and camouflage. Messmate pipefish exhibit red fluorescent light strongly in the fins, which is important in signaling with conspecifics. These fluorescent pigments are found in cells similar to melanophores, which may originate from microorganisms.

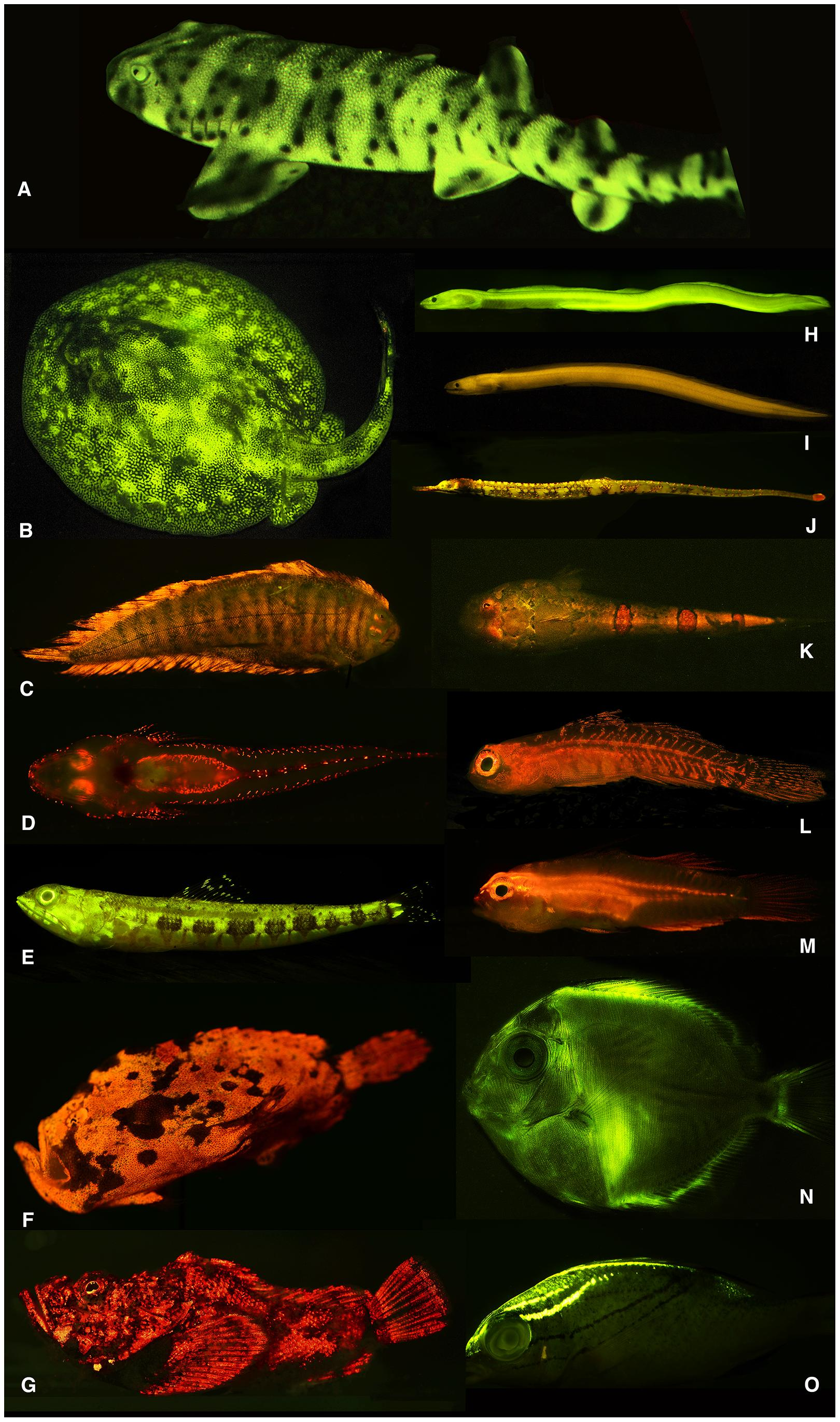
J. Messmate pipefish exhibiting yellow fluorescence

== Species description ==
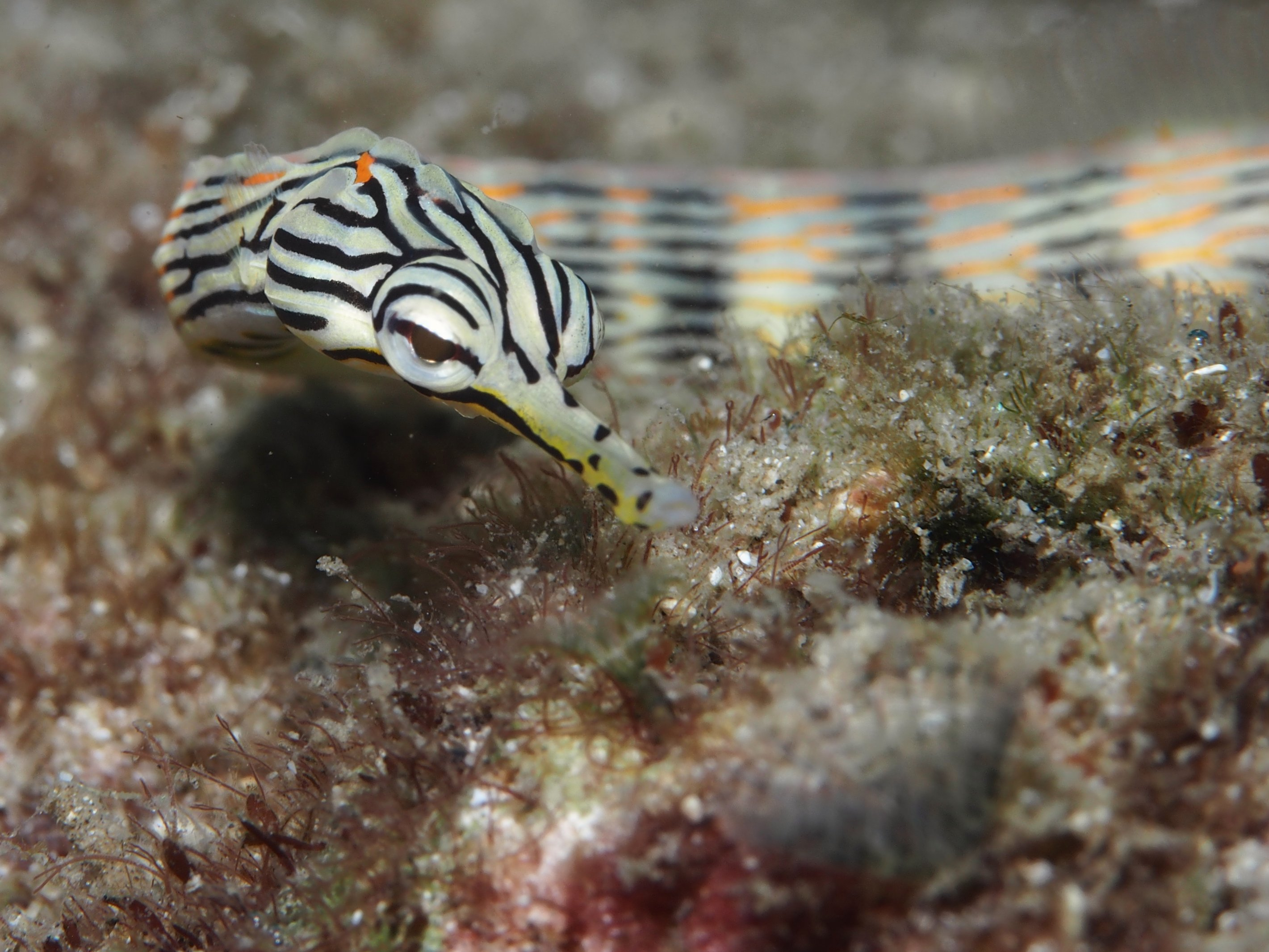
Messmate pipefish in Lembeh with striped patterns

Messmate pipefish have an elongated body shape with a long and narrow snout, soft rayed dorsal fin, and caudal fin. Their length ranges between 9 cm to 18 cm as adults, with the average being 13 cm. Coloration is variable but the majority feature a pale body, striped or reticulate head, poorly defined brown horizontal stripes on the sides of its trunk and tail, and a dorsal fin without pale spots. The bands are generally less visible on females who also have dark splotches on the underside of their trunk rings at the anterior end. Males can have bright blue transverse bars on the ventral side of the anterior trunk. Located on the ventral side of males near the tail is the brood pouch. Instead of protective plates, the eggs are covered by fleshy folds.

Juvenile forms of this fish generally lack a color pattern but exhibit spiny, serrated trunk/tail ridges and post larval membranous dorsal fin folds that extend along the tail. As they mature into adults, their coloration becomes more visible (around 4 cm). The ridges are mostly smooth in adults.

Messmate pipefish from the Seychelles have minimal markings across its entire body. When markings are present, they do not follow any particular pattern and are light brown. In contrast, messmate pipefish from Sri Lanka and the Pacific are well patterned and feature a strongly reticulate pattern on their heads.

Messmate pipefish can be differentiated from other fish of the Corythoichthys genus by the presence of 17 trunk rings. Messmate pipefish have around 48-54 rings across its body, 16 rays on its pectoral fins, and around 29 dorsal fin rays.

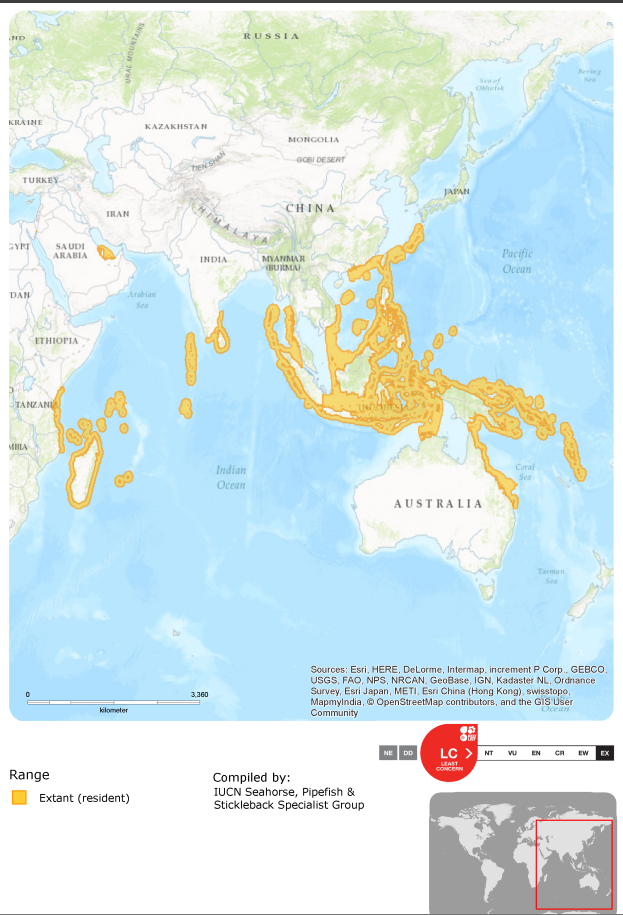
Yellow highlights on the map shows extant messmate pipefish range

== Distribution ==
Messmate pipefish inhabit the Indo-Pacific region, the area that includes tropical waters from the Indian ocean to the Pacific ocean. Messmate pipefish can be found in shallow seawater around 0-19.8 meters deep and near the sandy bottom of reef, seagrass, and coral, and rocky habitats. Messmate pipefish cannot tolerate fluctuations in salinity and seem to prefer warm temperatures.

Population size and abundance are unknown for this species.

== Life History ==
Messmate pipefish spend around 1 month in their pelagic larval form. Dispersal occurs during this stage and is largely dependent on ocean currents. Due to their long larval phase, messmate pipefish are able to disperse beyond geographic barriers, such as deep ocean straits, in contrast to other marine animals who have a larval phase that lasts only a few days to a week.

This species is cryptic and rarely swims into the water column other than to search for a mate. The more time individuals spend out in the open searching for mates or performing courting rituals, the higher the risk of predation by piscivorous fishes.

Messmate pipefish anchor themselves to coral in order to feed on tiny planktonic crustaceans. Harpacticoid and calanoid copepods make up a large component of their diet. These crustaceans exhibit nocturnal behavior and venture beyond the reefs at night. During the day, they hide in caves, crevices, coral, and substrate, where messmate pipefish can forage and feed on them.

=== Mating and reproduction ===
Messmate pipefish are strictly monogamous. They will mate with the same partner throughout the breeding season and will remain pairs until one dies or disappears. Despite being monogamous, females are the sex that primarily competes for mates which is in contrast to traditional sex roles where males invest more into mating and females provide majority of parental care. In these cases of sex role reversal, males are typically more choosy. The male’s brood pouch can only hold one clutch of eggs at a time, preventing it from successfully mating with more than one female. Occasionally males are observed carrying two clutches. However, the outer clutch is not able to adhere properly and always falls off by the next day. Females are unable to divide their clutches among different males.

Pairs mate around 8 times per breeding season which is from April to October. Each brooding period (time between spawning of eggs and hatching) for the male lasts around 9 to 19 days. Higher water temperatures result in shorter brooding periods. Females spawn eggs every 9 to 24 days. Larger females produce a greater number of eggs and eggs that are larger in size. Larger eggs result in larger offspring that show higher anti-predatory capacity.

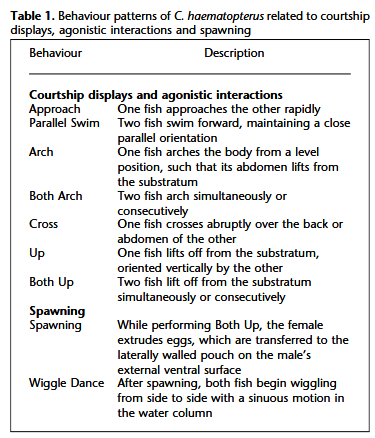
List of courtship displays performed by messmate pipefish.

Prior to breeding, a pair will engage in a courtship ritual that includes the following displays: approach, parallel swim, arch, both arch, cross, up, both up, spawning, and wiggle dance. The ritual begins at sunrise and lasts for an hour. During the "both up" display, the pair swims horizontally with their genital regions close together. The female lays eggs as a flat sheet before the horizontal swimming is stopped. The eggs are turned inside out and attached to the male’s brood pouch. After mating is completed, the male provides all of the parental care– which includes protecting, aerating, and osmoregulating the clutch.

There are generally more females than males in a population, resulting in some females who will not reproduce every breeding season. The majority of males are paired. Unmated females may sometimes intrude on pairs who are performing their courting ritual but are guarded from the male by his female partner. Females also have a larger home range and will travel further than males. Although many adult individuals have overlapping home ranges, interactions with other pipefish are generally non-territorial except for the morning of spawning or if mated females are guarding their partner from other females.

Despite there being more females than males in a population, males will not mate with more than one female. Males who switch mates require more time in between spawning cycles, which reduces the number of times they can breed during the season. Even though larger females produce offspring that are more fit, males do not seem to prefer females that are larger. Size may still play a role in mate choice– the amount of eggs that fit into a male’s brood pouch corresponds to the size of the clutch the female is able to extrude. Males who are significantly smaller than their pair may not be able to hold the entire clutch.

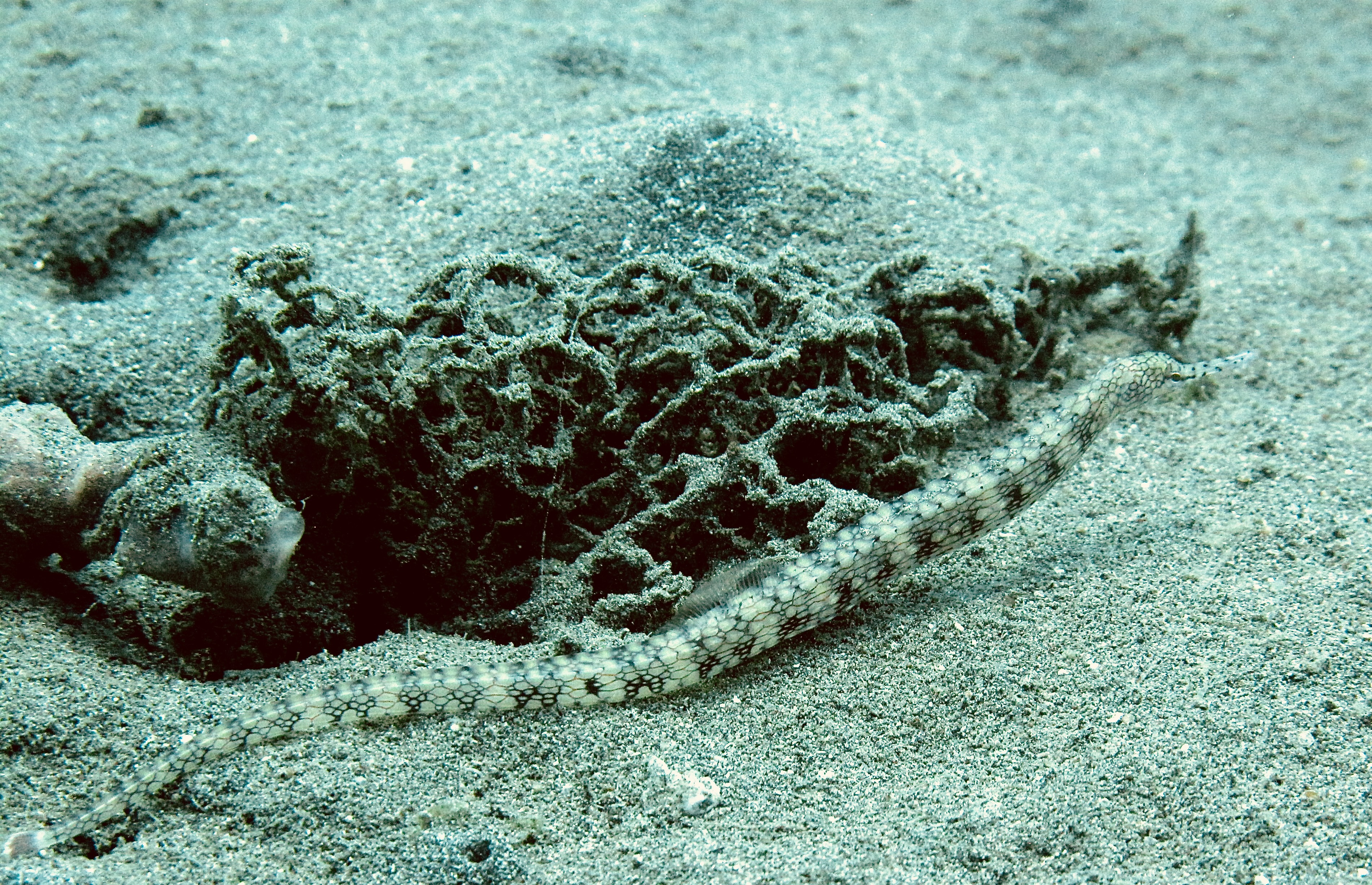
Messmate pipefish in Indonesia traversing across sandy bottom

=== Daily greetings ===
Even outside of breeding season, paired adults will partake in daily morning greetings. Greetings begin at sunrise and last 1-3 minutes. Only mated pairs exchanged daily greetings despite living within the home ranges of other conspecifics. The greeting site is located close to the spawning site. On non-spawning days, pairs will separate after their morning greeting and return to their home range. On spawning days, pairs will stay close to each other and occasionally participate in other displays until spawning. Messmate pipefish that are part of a pair ignore other adults and are able to recognize their partner among conspecifics even if their meeting location has changed. Visual recognition seems to be the cue that is most useful in distinguishing a partner due to the variability in color, facial markings, and patterns among individuals.

These daily greetings serve as a way to maintain the reproductive synchronization and pair bond of partners. The synchronization of reproductive cycles can shorten the interval between eggs hatching and remating, resulting in the pair mating more times per season. The pair bond is maintained through these daily greetings despite the lack of mate guarding by females outside of these greetings. This is due to the male’s inability to carry more than one clutch of eggs at a time.

== Conservation status ==
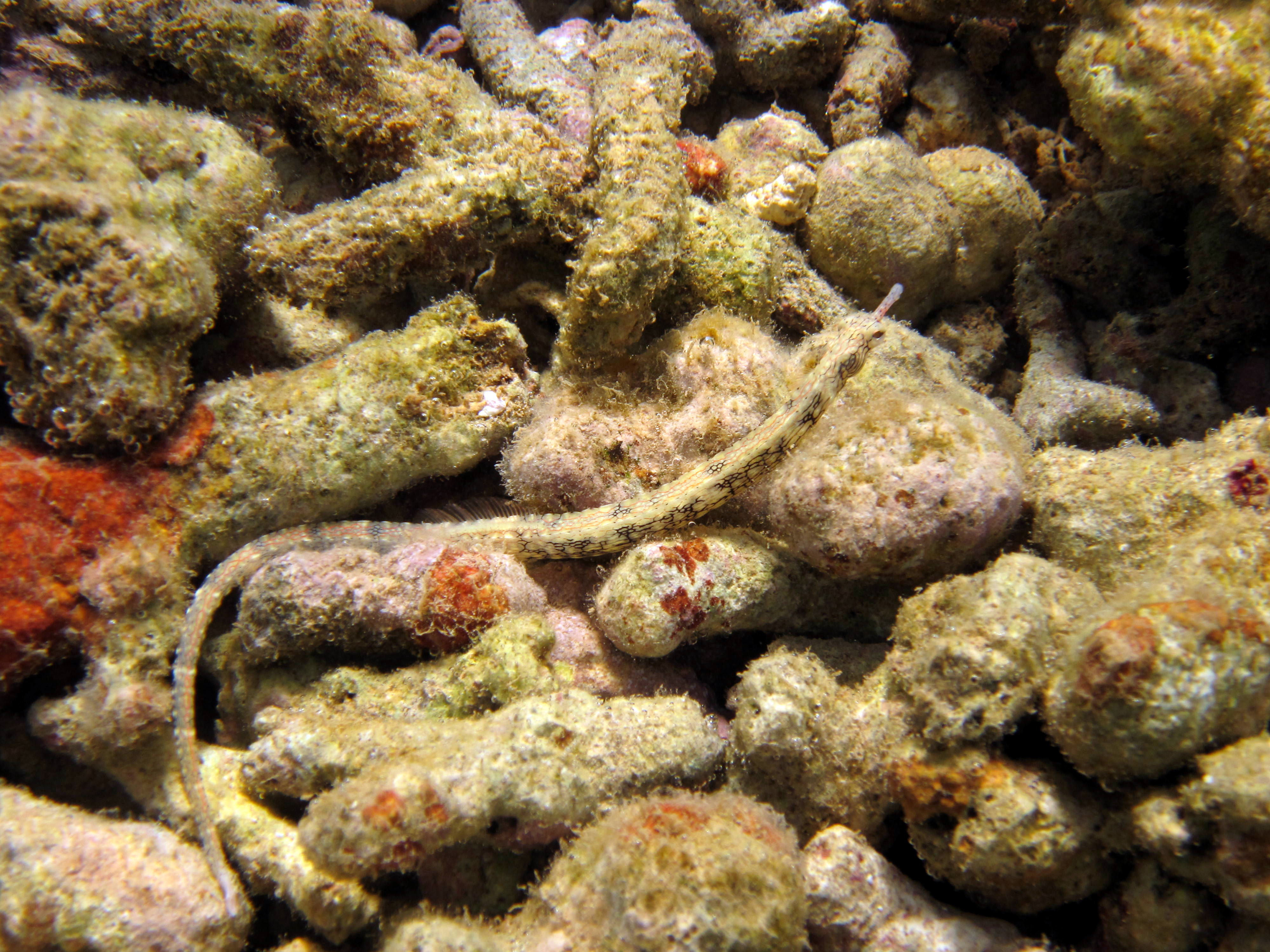
Messmate pipefish in Tutuila surrounded by corals and rocks

Messmate pipefish are listed as Least Concern in the IUCN Red List. They may be affected by loss of coral and seagrass habitat but are able to survive in a variety of other habitats. Human activity like residential and commercial development, fishing, and pollution are possible reasons for habitat loss and fragmentation. Due to their sensitivity to and preferences in water temperature and salinity, they may be affected by climate change as well. During the Last Glacial Maximum when temperatures were around 50 °F colder than today, it is possible that some populations of messmate pipefish went extinct and only recolonized and expanded their range after temperatures increased. Messmate pipefish are kept in aquariums and can be bought online as pets. They may also be traded for use in traditional medicines like other Syngnathids but exact numbers are not known.

Messmate pipefish are protected in Australia under the Environmental Protection and Biodiversity Conservation Act (1999). Under this act, the Marine bioregional plan for the North Marine Region was developed in 2012 with the goal of supporting marine conservation and sustainable use of ocean resources. This plan is targeted towards messmate pipefish and other Syngnathids who are found in large numbers throughout the North Marine Region in Australia. There are no species-specific conservation measures currently in place for the messmate pipefish.
