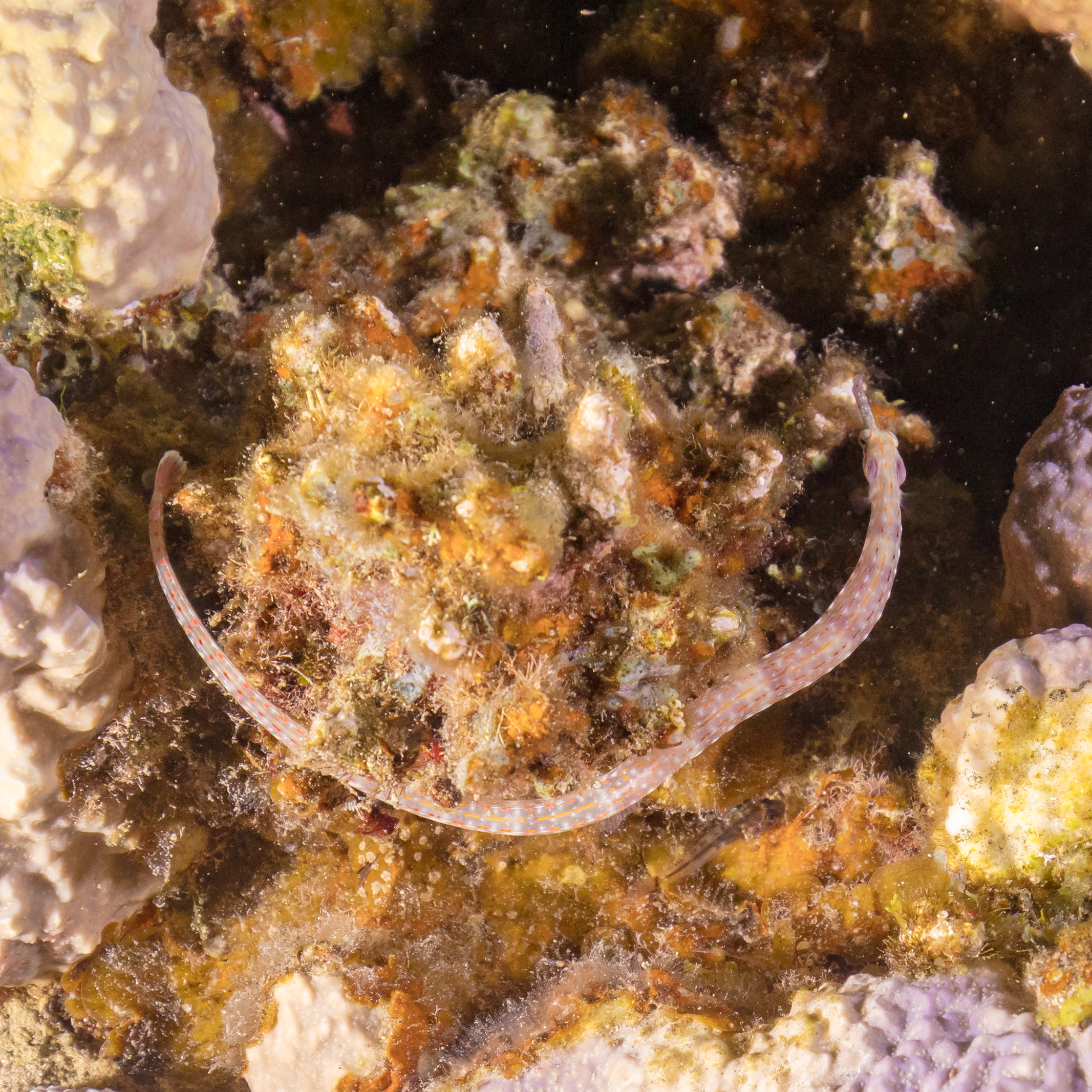
- Corythoichthys insularis, Ras Muhammad National Park, Egypt

Conservation status
- Least Concern (IUCN 3.1)

Scientific classification
- Kingdom: Animalia
- Phylum: Chordata
- Class: Actinopterygii
- Order: Syngnathiformes
- Family: Syngnathidae
- Genus: Corythoichthys
- Species: C. insularis

Binomial name
- Corythoichthys insularis Dawson, 1977

= Corythoichthys insularis =

Species of fish

Corythoichthys insularis is a species of marine fish in the family Syngnathidae. It is found in the western Indian Ocean, from the Amirante and Comoros islands to the Maldives. It inhabits coral and rocky reefs at depths of 20 to 45 metres (66 to 148 ft), where it can grow to lengths of 10 centimetres (3.9 in). This species is ovoviviparous, with sexual maturity being reached at 8.2 centimetres (3.2 in). The male carries the fertilised eggs in a brood pouch located under his tail.
