= Uropterygius supraforatus =

Conservation status
- Least Concern (IUCN 3.1)

Scientific classification
- Kingdom: Animalia
- Phylum: Chordata
- Class: Actinopterygii
- Order: Anguilliformes
- Family: Muraenidae
- Genus: Uropterygius
- Species: U. supraforatus

Binomial name
- Uropterygius supraforatus (Regan, 1909)

Species of fish

Uropterygius supraforatus is a moray eel found in coral reefs in the Pacific and Indian Oceans. It is commonly known as the many-toothed snake moray, or the toothy snakemoray.
