= Uropterygius kamar =

Conservation status
- Least Concern (IUCN 3.1)

Scientific classification
- Kingdom: Animalia
- Phylum: Chordata
- Class: Actinopterygii
- Order: Anguilliformes
- Family: Muraenidae
- Genus: Uropterygius
- Species: U. kamar

Binomial name
- Uropterygius kamar McCosker & J. E. Randall, 1977

Species of fish

Uropterygius kamar is a moray eel found in coral reefs in the Arctic Ocean and Indian Oceans. It is commonly known as the barlip reef-eel, barlip snakemoray, moon moray, or the moon snake moray.
