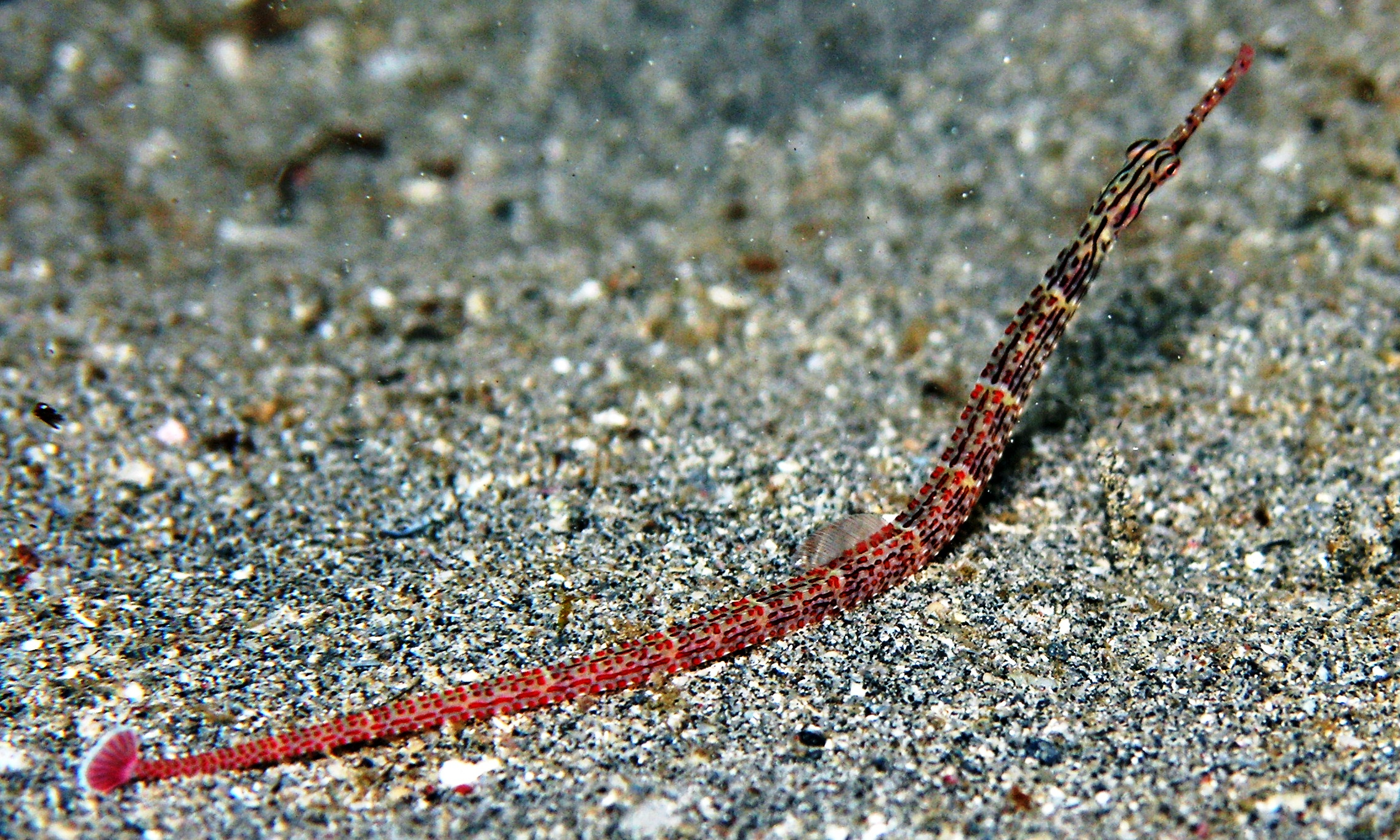

Conservation status
- Least Concern (IUCN 3.1)

Scientific classification
- Kingdom: Animalia
- Phylum: Chordata
- Class: Actinopterygii
- Division: Teleostei
- Order: Syngnathiformes
- Family: Syngnathidae
- Genus: Corythoichthys
- Species: C. schultzi

Binomial name
- Corythoichthys schultzi Herald, 1953

= Schultz's pipefish =

Species of fish

Schultz's pipefish, Corythoichthys schultzi, is a pipefish of the family Syngnathidae.

A pair of Corythoichthys schultzi.

== Etymology ==
The genus name Corythoichthys derives from the Greek words coris meaning "helmet" and ichthus meaning "fish". The specific name schultzi honors Leonard Peter Schultz, an American ichthyologist of the Smithsonian Institution (Washington).

== Description ==
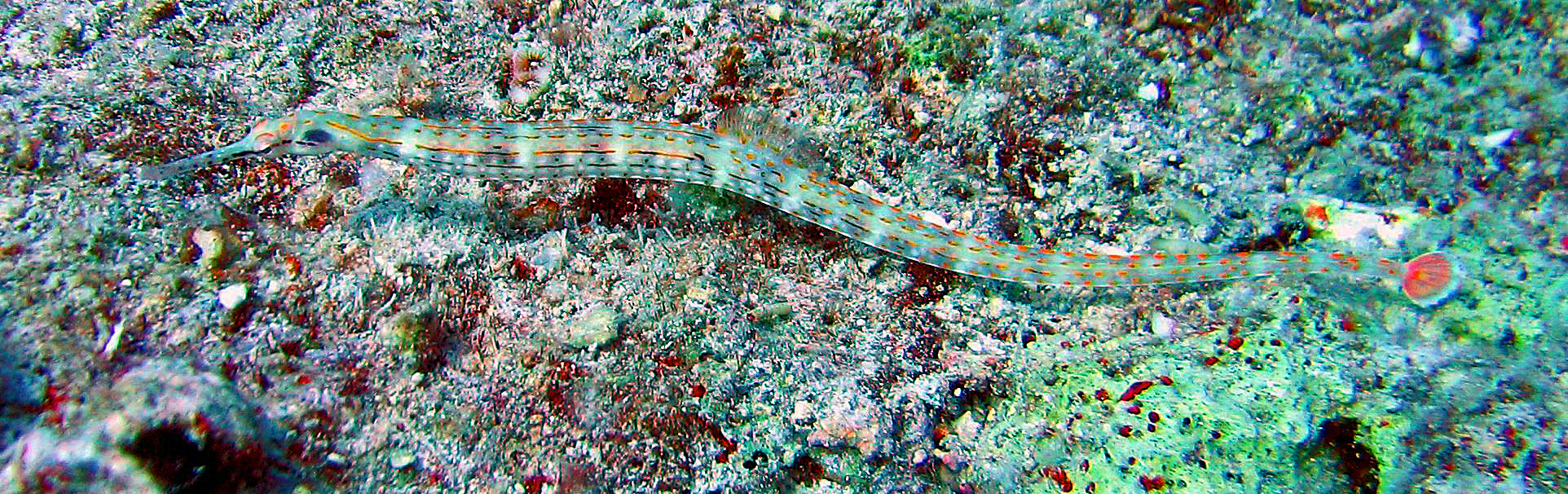
Corythoichthys schultzi at Hurghada, Red Sea

Corythoichthys schultzi can reach a length up to 16 centimetres (6.3 in) in males. The body is cylindrical and very elongated. These pipefishes have a cryptic coloration making the difficult to be detected by both prey and predators. The basic color of the body is whitish, with small black, brown and reddish dashes and yellowish rings. The eyes are protruding and the snout is long, slightly compressed and thinner than the body. The caudal fin is present but quite small. Adults may form small aggregation. Ovoviviparous, the male carries the eggs in a brood pouch which is found under the tail. In this pouch they also carry the developing young pipefishes.

== Distribution ==
This species is widespread throughout the Indo-Pacific Oceans, from Red Sea and East Africa to Tonga, throughout Micronesia, northern Australia and New Caledonia.

== Habitat ==
Schultz's pipefish is a benthic species associated with coral reefs. It usually can be found in lagoon and seaward reefs at depths between 2 and 30 metres (6.6 and 98.4 ft). The adults live in pairs or small groups when out in the open and find a safe places to spend the night.

== Bibliography ==
- Dawson, C. E., 1977: Review of the pipefish genus Corythoichthys with description of three new species. Copeia 1977: 295-338.
- Dawson, C.E., 1985. Indo-Pacific pipefishes (Red Sea to the Americas). The Gulf Coast Research Laboratory Ocean Springs, Mississippi, US.
- Eschmeyer, William N.: Genera of Recent Fishes. California Academy of Sciences. San Francisco, California, US. iii + 697. ISBN 0-940228-23-8. Any 1990.
- Eschmeyer, William N., ed. 1998. Catalog of Fishes. Special Publication of the Center for Biodiversity Research and Information, núm. 1, vol. 1-3. California Academy of Sciences. San Francisco, California, US. ISBN 0-940228-47-5.
- Hardy, J.D. Jr., 2003. Coral reef fish species. NOAA\National Oceanographic Data Center. NODC Coral Reef Data and Information Management System. US. 537 p.
- Helfman, G., B. Collette i D. Facey: The diversity of fishes. Blackwell Science, Malden, Massachusetts, US, 1997.
- Lourie, S. A., Amanda C.J. Vincent i Heather J. Hall: Seahorses: An Identification Guide to the World's Species and their Conservation. Dorling Print Limited, Dorling House: London, Great Britain: Project Seahorse, 1999.
- Moyle, P. i J. Cech.: Fishes: An Introduction to Ichthyology, Upper Saddle River, New Jersey, US: Prentice-Hall. Any 2000.
- Nelson, Joseph S.: Fishes of the World, John Wiley & Sons. ISBN 0-471-25031-7. Any 2006.
- Wheeler, A.: The World Encyclopedia of Fishes, London: Macdonald. Any 1985.
