= Uropterygius fasciolatus =

Conservation status
- Least Concern (IUCN 3.1)

Scientific classification
- Kingdom: Animalia
- Phylum: Chordata
- Class: Actinopterygii
- Order: Anguilliformes
- Family: Muraenidae
- Genus: Uropterygius
- Species: U. fasciolatus

Binomial name
- Uropterygius fasciolatus (Regan, 1909)

Species of fish

Uropterygius fasciolatus is a moray eel found in coral reefs in the western central Pacific Ocean. It was first named by Regan in 1909, and is commonly known as the blotched moray, barred moray, or the Gosline's snake moray.
