= Uropterygius inornatus =

Conservation status
- Least Concern (IUCN 3.1)

Scientific classification
- Kingdom: Animalia
- Phylum: Chordata
- Class: Actinopterygii
- Order: Anguilliformes
- Family: Muraenidae
- Genus: Uropterygius
- Species: U. inornatus

Binomial name
- Uropterygius inornatus Gosline, 1958

Species of fish

Uropterygius inornatus is a moray eel found in the western Indian Ocean and in the Pacific Ocean to Hawaii. It is commonly known as the drab snake moray or black snake moray. It is faded tan in colour. First described by W.A. Gosline in 1958, this eel typically resides in tropical marine environments and is reef-associated, often found in shallow lagoons or seaward reefs at depths of 8 to 18 meters.

The eel has a maximum length of about 19 cm and displays a uniform faded tan color, with the ventral side of the head and tail tip appearing paler. Notably, it lacks vomerine teeth, which sets it apart from some related species. As a benthic species, Uropterygius inornatus primarily inhabits crevices within reefs and is harmless to humans.
