= Uropterygius macularius =

Conservation status
- Least Concern (IUCN 3.1)

Scientific classification
- Kingdom: Animalia
- Phylum: Chordata
- Class: Actinopterygii
- Division: Teleostei
- Order: Anguilliformes
- Family: Muraenidae
- Genus: Uropterygius
- Species: U. macularius

Binomial name
- Uropterygius macularius (Lesueur, 1825)

Synonyms
- Leptocephalus juliae Tommasi, 1960

Species of fish

Uropterygius macularius is a moray eel found in coral reefs in the western Atlantic Ocean. It is commonly known as the marbled moray.
