= Uropterygius makatei =

Scientific classification
- Kingdom: Animalia
- Phylum: Chordata
- Class: Actinopterygii
- Order: Anguilliformes
- Family: Muraenidae
- Genus: Uropterygius
- Species: U. makatei

Binomial name
- Uropterygius makatei Gosline, 1958

Species of fish

Uropterygius makatei is a moray eel found in surge-exposed inshore coral reefs around New Caledonia and Polynesia. It was first named by Gosline in 1958.
