= Uropterygius nagoensis =

Conservation status
- Least Concern (IUCN 3.1)

Scientific classification
- Kingdom: Animalia
- Phylum: Chordata
- Class: Actinopterygii
- Order: Anguilliformes
- Family: Muraenidae
- Genus: Uropterygius
- Species: U. nagoensis

Binomial name
- Uropterygius nagoensis Hatooka, 1984

Species of fish

Uropterygius nagoensis is a species of moray eels found in the western Pacific Ocean. It was first named by Kiyotaka Hatooka in 1984, and is commonly known as the Nago snake moray.
