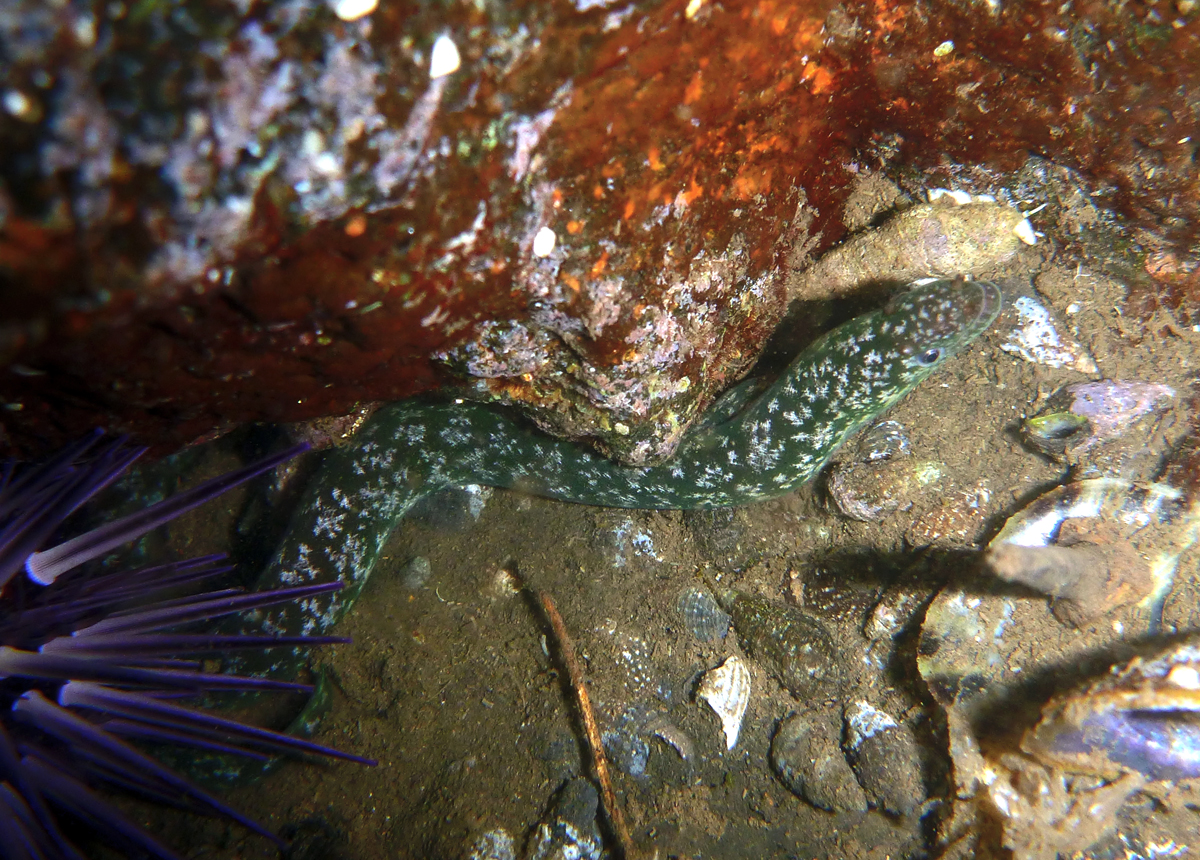

Conservation status
- Least Concern (IUCN 3.1)

Scientific classification
- Kingdom: Animalia
- Phylum: Chordata
- Class: Actinopterygii
- Order: Anguilliformes
- Family: Muraenidae
- Genus: Uropterygius
- Species: U. xanthopterus

Binomial name
- Uropterygius xanthopterus Bleeker, 1859

= Uropterygius xanthopterus =

Species of fish

Uropterygius xanthopterus is a moray eel found in coral reefs in the Pacific and Indian oceans. It is commonly known as the freckleface reef-eel, spottedface moray, or the white-speckled snake moray.
