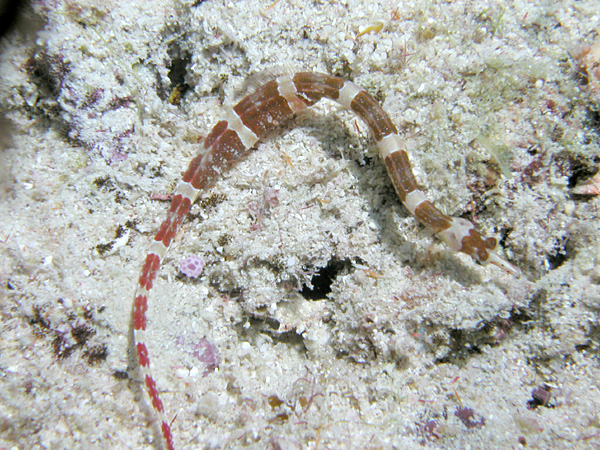

Conservation status
- Least Concern (IUCN 3.1)

Scientific classification
- Kingdom: Animalia
- Phylum: Chordata
- Class: Actinopterygii
- Division: Teleostei
- Order: Syngnathiformes
- Family: Syngnathidae
- Genus: Corythoichthys
- Species: C. amplexus

Binomial name
- Corythoichthys amplexus C. E. Dawson & Randall, 1975

= Corythoichthys amplexus =

Species of fish

Corythoichthys amplexus, known commonly as the brown-banded pipefish, is a species of marine fish in the family Syngnathidae.

== Description ==
=== Anatomy ===
The brown-banded pipefish is a small size fish and can reach a maximum size of 10 centimetres (3.9 in) length. The skin has a base colour of light tan with broad reddish-brown bands on the body, each 3–4 rings wide, which lie across the side and dorsal surfaces, occasionally these are divided to form two closely set bands, and sometimes they are indistinct on the posterior third of the tail. The head lacks prominent stripes behind eye and the ventral surface of anterior trunk rings is blotched with dark brown in males, while often being marked with small paired spots in females.

=== Reproduction ===
The adult males and females form monogamous pairs, they are an ovoviviparous species, in which the males brood the fertilised eggs in a brood pouch situated under his tail. The brood pouch protects the dorsal surface and side of the egg mass, leaving the ventral surface exposed. Males are capable of once they attain a total length of 57 millimetres (2.2 in). The eggs mass consists of 2–17 transverse rows within a gelatinous matrix.

== Distribution and habitat ==
The brown-banded pipefish is widespread throughout the tropical waters of the Indo-West Pacific region, from the eastern coast of Africa to the western Pacific north to the Ryukyu Islands to south the Great Barrier Reef. Records from South Africa and Madagascar require verification. It is a secretive species which occurs in coral reefs, lagoons, harbours, and open sandy-flats; as well as in rubble along edges of reefs and in small patches of reef which are surrounded by sandy flats. They occur to a depth of 10 metres (33 ft). It feeds on small crustaceans.

== Human uses ==
They are traded for the aquarium trade and like other pipefishes and sea horses they may be dried and traded for traditional medicine and for sale as curios.
