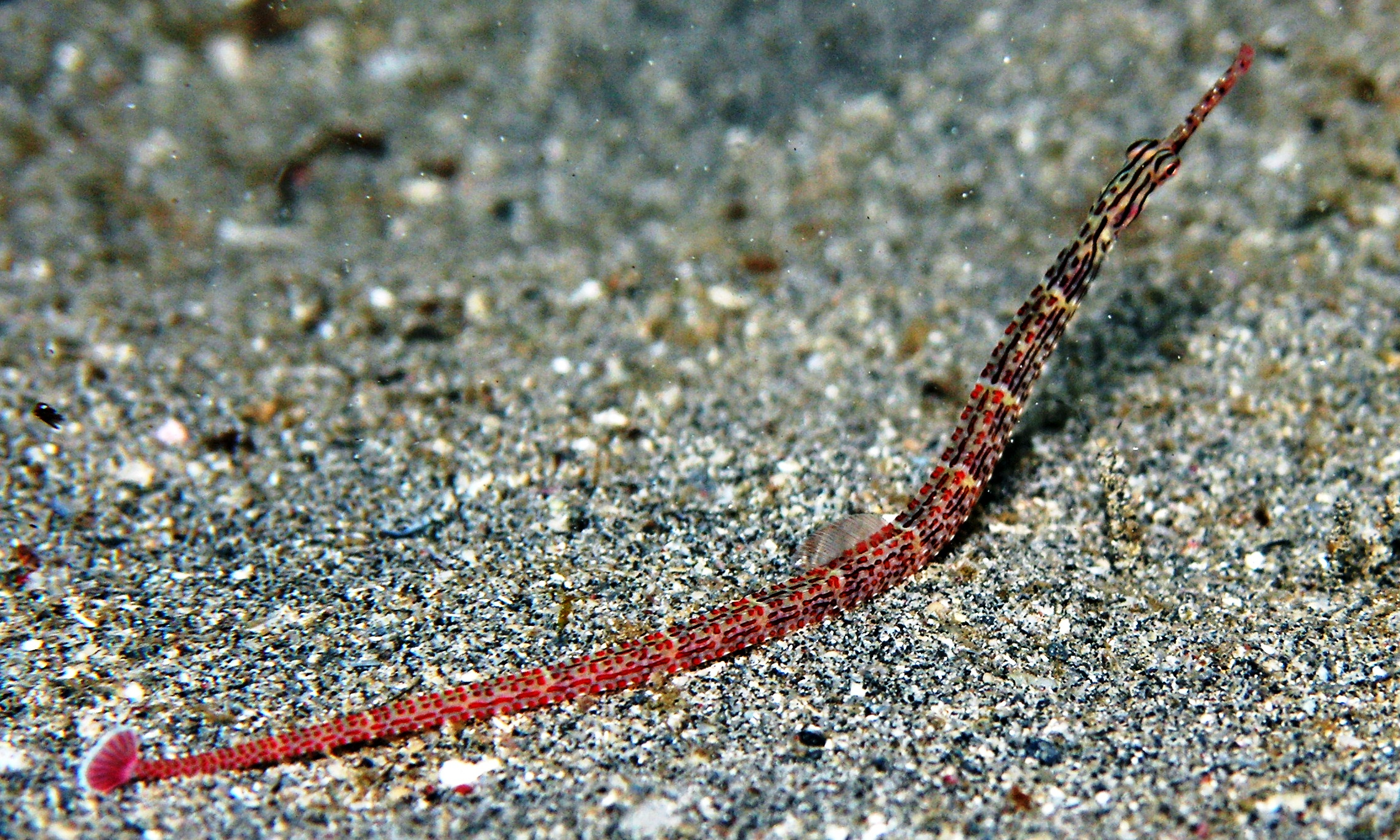
- Schultz's pipefish, Corythoichthys schultzi.

Scientific classification
- Kingdom: Animalia
- Phylum: Chordata
- Class: Actinopterygii
- Division: Teleostei
- Order: Syngnathiformes
- Family: Syngnathidae
- Subfamily: Syngnathinae
- Genus: Corythoichthys; Kaup, 1853

Type species
- Syngnathus fasciatus Gray 1830

Species
- See text.

Synonyms
- Bhanotichthys Parr, 1930

= Corythoichthys =

Genus of fishes

Corythoichthys is a genus of pipefishes of the family Syngnathidae. All species in the genus are found in the tropical Indian and Pacific Oceans on reefs or rubble bottoms. Relationships and taxonomy within the genus are still in debate, but there may be at least 23 species.

Males and females engage in seasonal pair bonding and are most often found in pairs on reefs. During courtship, the male and female "dance" around one another above the substrate. The female lays her eggs in a sheet, which she then presses against the underside of the male. The male will then grow skin over the eggs to form a brood pouch. Small pipefish hatch out of the eggs within a few weeks.

== Species ==
There are currently 12 recognized species in this genus:

- Corythoichthys amplexus C. E. Dawson & J. E. Randall, 1975 (Brown-banded pipefish)
- Corythoichthys benedetto G. R. Allen & Erdmann, 2008 (Benedotto's pipefish)
- Corythoichthys conspicillatus (Jenyns, 1842) (Reticulate pipefish)
- Corythoichthys flavofasciatus (Rüppell, 1838) (Network pipefish)

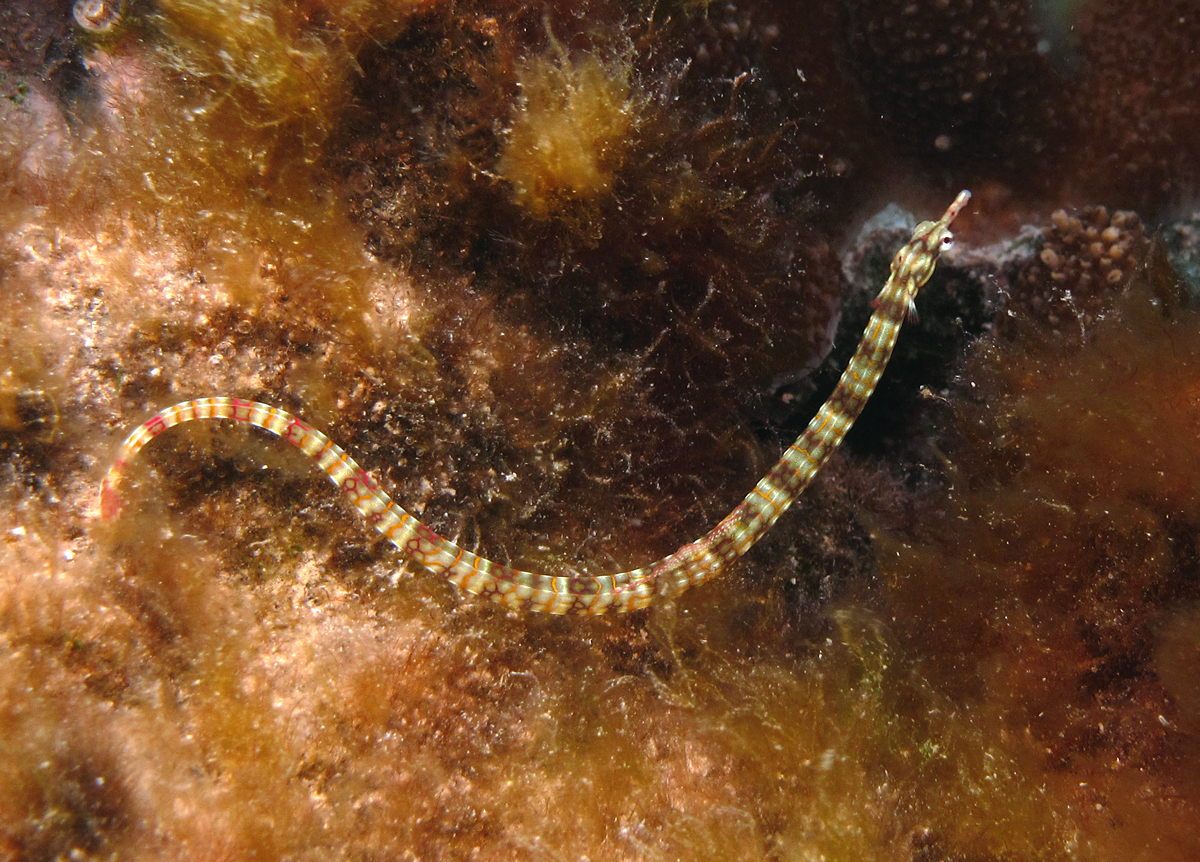
A network pipefish (Corythoichthys flavofasciatus).

- Corythoichthys haematopterus (Bleeker, 1851) (Messmate pipefish)
- Corythoichthys insularis C. E. Dawson, 1977
- Corythoichthys intestinalis (E. P. Ramsay, 1881) (Scribbled pipefish)
- Corythoichthys nigripectus Herald, 1953 (Black-breasted pipefish)
- Corythoichthys ocellatus Herald, 1953 (Ocellated pipefish)
- Corythoichthys paxtoni C. E. Dawson, 1977 (Paxton's pipefish)
- Corythoichthys polynotatus C. E. Dawson, 1977 (Many-spotted pipefish)
- Corythoichthys schultzi Herald, 1953 (Schultz's pipefish)
- Corythoichthys waitei Jordan & Seale, 1906 (Waite's pipefish) (debated)
