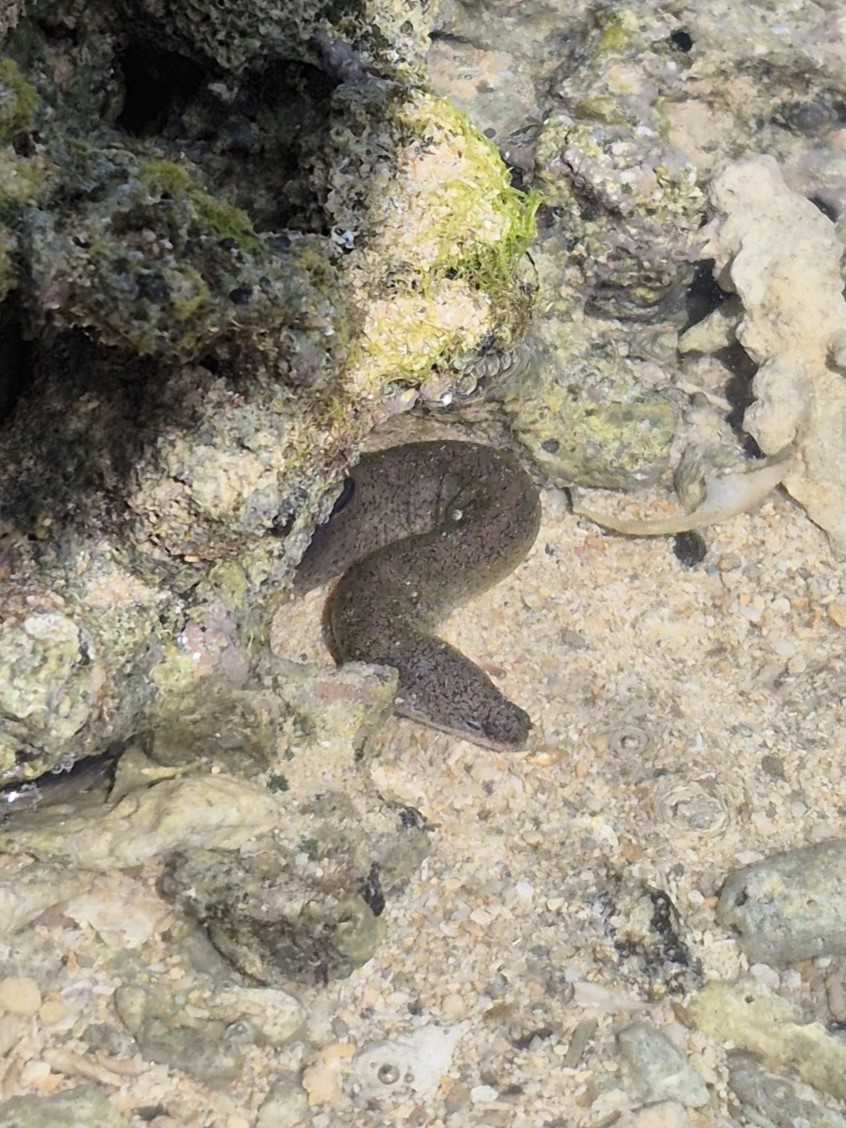

Conservation status
- Least Concern (IUCN 3.1)

Scientific classification
- Kingdom: Animalia
- Phylum: Chordata
- Class: Actinopterygii
- Order: Anguilliformes
- Family: Muraenidae
- Genus: Uropterygius
- Species: U. micropterus

Binomial name
- Uropterygius micropterus (Bleeker, 1852)

= Uropterygius micropterus =

Species of fish

Uropterygius micropterus is a moray eel found in coral reefs in the Pacific and Indian Oceans. It is commonly known as the tidepool snake moray, shortfin snake moray, or the shortfinned reef-eel.
