= Uropterygius golanii =

Conservation status
- Data Deficient (IUCN 3.1)

Scientific classification
- Kingdom: Animalia
- Phylum: Chordata
- Class: Actinopterygii
- Order: Anguilliformes
- Family: Muraenidae
- Genus: Uropterygius
- Species: U. golanii

Binomial name
- Uropterygius golanii McCosker & D. G. Smith, 1997

Species of fish

Uropterygius golanii is a moray eel found in the western Indian Ocean, in the northern Red Sea. It is grayish-brown in colour. It reaches a maximum length of around 45 centimetres (1.48 ft).
