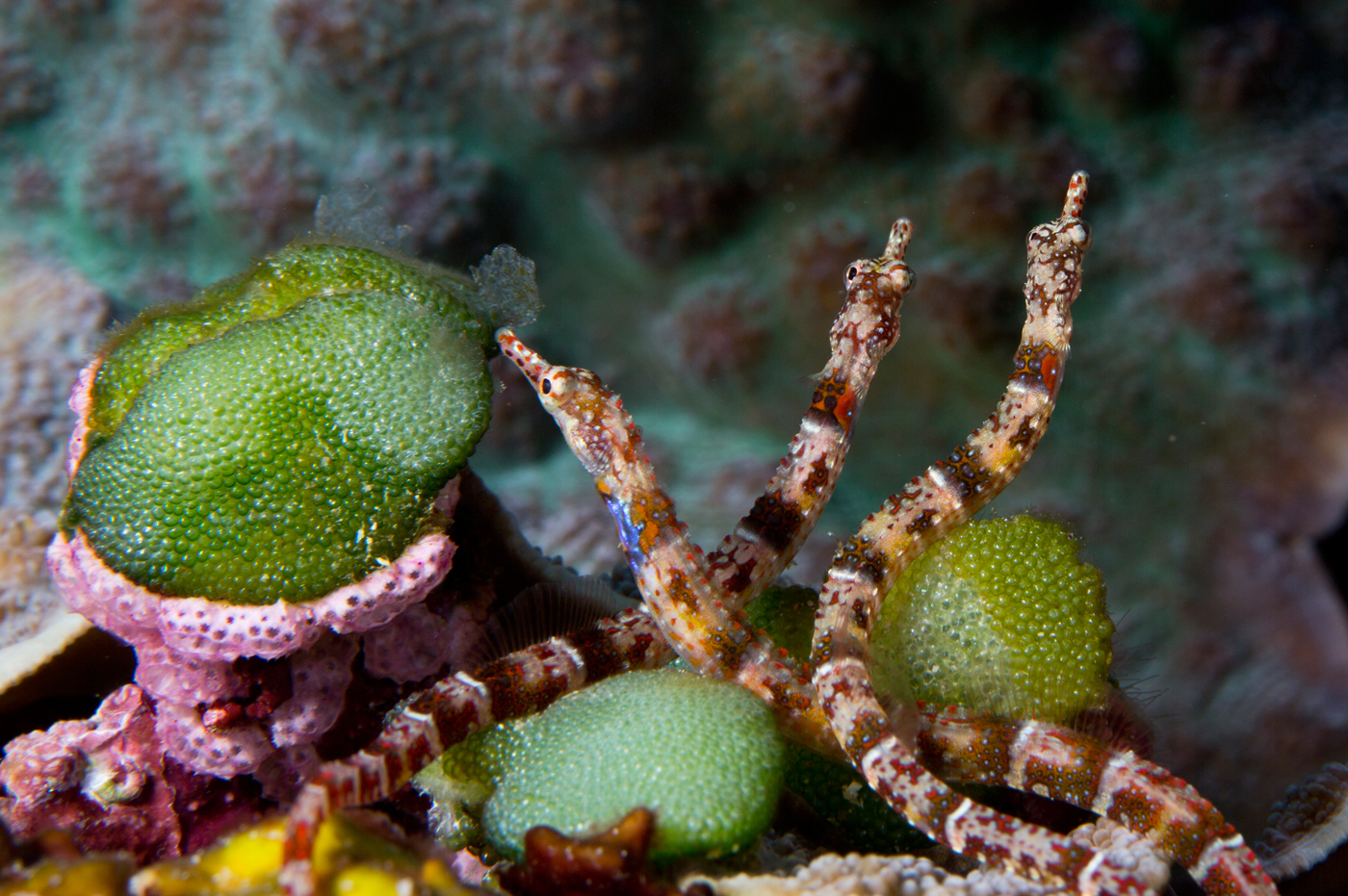
- Raja Ampat islands, West Papua, Indonesia, December 2016.

Conservation status
- Least Concern (IUCN 3.1)

Scientific classification
- Kingdom: Animalia
- Phylum: Chordata
- Class: Actinopterygii
- Division: Teleostei
- Order: Syngnathiformes
- Family: Syngnathidae
- Genus: Corythoichthys
- Species: C. benedetto

Binomial name
- Corythoichthys benedetto G. R. Allen & Erdmann, 2008

= Corythoichthys benedetto =

Species of fish

Corythoichthys benedetto, commonly known as Benedetto's pipefish, is a species of marine fish of the family Syngnathidae. It inhabits the Indo-West Pacific, near Thailand, Myanmar, Indonesia, Papua New Guinea, and Australia. It is found on algae-covered rocky surfaces and gorgonian sea fans at depths of 5 to 20 metres (16 to 66 ft), where it can grow to lengths of around 7 centimetres (2.8 in). It is usually found alone, although it can be found in groups of up to four individuals. This species is ovoviviparous, with males brooding when they are at lengths of 5 to 5.5 centimetres (2.0 to 2.2 in).

== Etymology ==
The specific name and common name honour the late Italian prime minister Benedetto Craxi (1934-2000).

== Description ==
Corythoichthys benedetto grows up to lengths of 7 centimetres (2.8 in). It may be identified by its body pattern of 12 thin white bars along the length of its body, each preceded by a thick red bar. These bars may be punctuated by variable-sized white ocelli.
