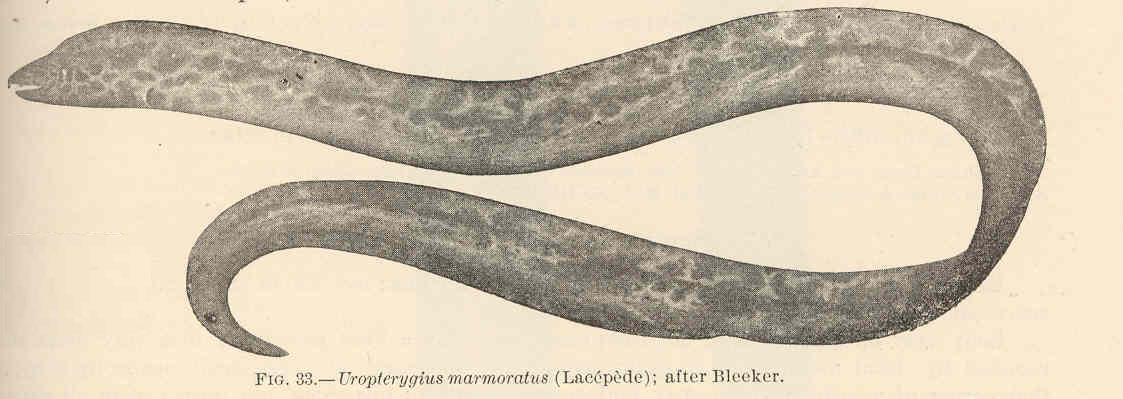

Conservation status
- Least Concern (IUCN 3.1)

Scientific classification
- Kingdom: Animalia
- Phylum: Chordata
- Class: Actinopterygii
- Order: Anguilliformes
- Family: Muraenidae
- Genus: Uropterygius
- Species: U. marmoratus

Binomial name
- Uropterygius marmoratus (Lacépède, 1803)

= Uropterygius marmoratus =

Species of fish

Uropterygius marmoratus is a moray eel found in coral reefs in the Pacific and Indian Oceans. It is commonly known as the marbled reef-eel, marbled eel, marbled snake moray, marbled moray, or the slender conger eel.
