= Uropterygius oligospondylus =

Scientific classification
- Kingdom: Animalia
- Phylum: Chordata
- Class: Actinopterygii
- Order: Anguilliformes
- Family: Muraenidae
- Genus: Uropterygius
- Species: U. oligospondylus

Binomial name
- Uropterygius oligospondylus I. S. Chen, J. E. Randall & K. H. Loh, 2008

Species of fish

Uropterygius oligospondylus is a moray eel.

== Description ==
It has fewer vertebrae than its congenerate animals, a gray body background with a blackish reticular pattern, and a greater body depth at gill opening 7.3.
