= Corythoichthys paxtoni =

Conservation status
- Least Concern (IUCN 3.1)

Scientific classification
- Kingdom: Animalia
- Phylum: Chordata
- Class: Actinopterygii
- Order: Syngnathiformes
- Family: Syngnathidae
- Genus: Corythoichthys
- Species: C. paxtoni

Binomial name
- Corythoichthys paxtoni Dawson, 1977

Species of fish

Corythoichthys paxtoni, commonly known as Paxton's pipefish, is a species of marine fish of the family Syngnathidae. It is endemic to the Coral Sea, being found in the Great Barrier Reef, the Chesterfield Islands, and New Caledonia. It inhabits coral reefs and rubble lagoons to depths of 18 metres (59 ft), where it can grow to lengths of 13 centimetres (5.1 in). This species mates monogamously and is ovoviviparous, with males carrying eggs until giving birth to live young.

== Etymology ==
The generic name is derived from Greek korys or korythos which means "helmet" and ichtys which means "fish". The specific name honours Dr John R. Paxton, the former Curator of Fishes, Australian Museum, Sydney.
