= Uropterygius genie =

Conservation status
- Data Deficient (IUCN 3.1)

Scientific classification
- Kingdom: Animalia
- Phylum: Chordata
- Class: Actinopterygii
- Order: Anguilliformes
- Family: Muraenidae
- Genus: Uropterygius
- Species: U. genie

Binomial name
- Uropterygius genie J. E. Randall & Golani, 1995

Species of fish

Uropterygius genie is a moray eel found in the western Indian Ocean, specifically the Red Sea.
