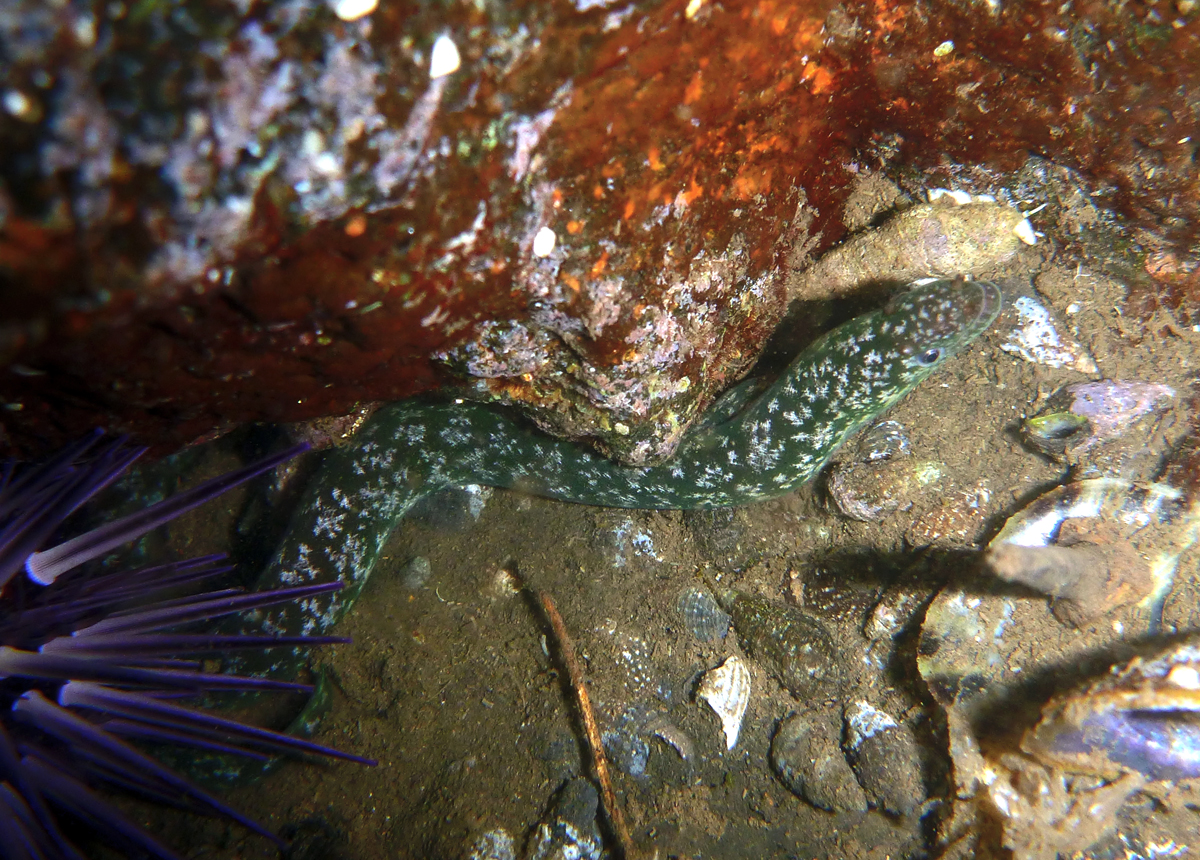
- Uropterygius xanthopterus

Scientific classification
- Kingdom: Animalia
- Phylum: Chordata
- Class: Actinopterygii
- Division: Teleostei
- Order: Anguilliformes
- Family: Muraenidae
- Subfamily: Uropterygiinae
- Genus: Uropterygius; Rüppell, 1838

Type species
- Uropterygius concolor Rüppell, 1838

Species
- See text

= Uropterygius =

Genus of fishes

Uropterygius is a genus of moray eels in the family Muraenidae.

== Species ==
There are currently 20 recognized species in this genus:

- Uropterygius concolor Rüppell, 1838 (Unicolor snake moray)
- Uropterygius cyamommatus Huang, Liao & Tan, 2023
- Uropterygius fasciolatus (Regan, 1909) (Blotched moray)
- Uropterygius fuscoguttatus L. P. Schultz, 1953 (Brown spotted snake moray)
- Uropterygius genie J. E. Randall & Golani, 1995
- Uropterygius golanii McCosker & D. G. Smith, 1997
- Uropterygius hades Huang, Hibino, Balisco & Liao, 2024 (Hades' snake moray)
- Uropterygius inornatus Gosline, 1958 (Drab snake moray)
- Uropterygius kamar McCosker & J. E. Randall, 1977 (Barlip reef-eel)
- Uropterygius macrocephalus (Bleeker, 1864) (Needle-tooth moray)
- Uropterygius mactanensis Huang, Balisco, Evacitas & Liao, 2023
- Uropterygius macularius (Lesueur, 1825) (Marbled moray)
- Uropterygius marmoratus (Lacépède, 1803) (Marbled reef-eel)
- Uropterygius micropterus (Bleeker, 1852) (Tidepool snake moray)
- Uropterygius nagoensis Hatooka, 1984
- Uropterygius oligospondylus I. S. Chen, J. E. Randall & K. H. Loh, 2008
- Uropterygius polyspilus (Regan, 1909) (Large-spotted snake moray)
- Uropterygius polystictus G. S. Myers & Wade, 1941 (Many-spotted moray)
- Uropterygius supraforatus (Regan, 1909) (Many-toothed snake moray)
- Uropterygius versutus W. A. Bussing, 1991 (Two-holes moray)
- Uropterygius wheeleri Blache, 1967
- Uropterygius xanthopterus Bleeker, 1859 (Freckleface reef-eel)
- Uropterygius xenodontus McCosker & D. G. Smith, 1997 (Black snake moray)

=== Formerly included species ===
- Anarchias cantonensis – formerly Uropterygius cantonensis
