= Uropterygius versutus =

Scientific classification
- Kingdom: Animalia
- Phylum: Chordata
- Class: Actinopterygii
- Order: Anguilliformes
- Family: Muraenidae
- Genus: Uropterygius
- Species: U. versutus

Binomial name
- Uropterygius versutus W. A. Bussing, 1991

Species of fish

Uropterygius versutus is a moray eel found in the eastern Pacific Ocean, from Mexico to Panama. It is commonly known as the two-holes moray, or the crafty moray. It dwells on sand and between rocks on ocean floors.
