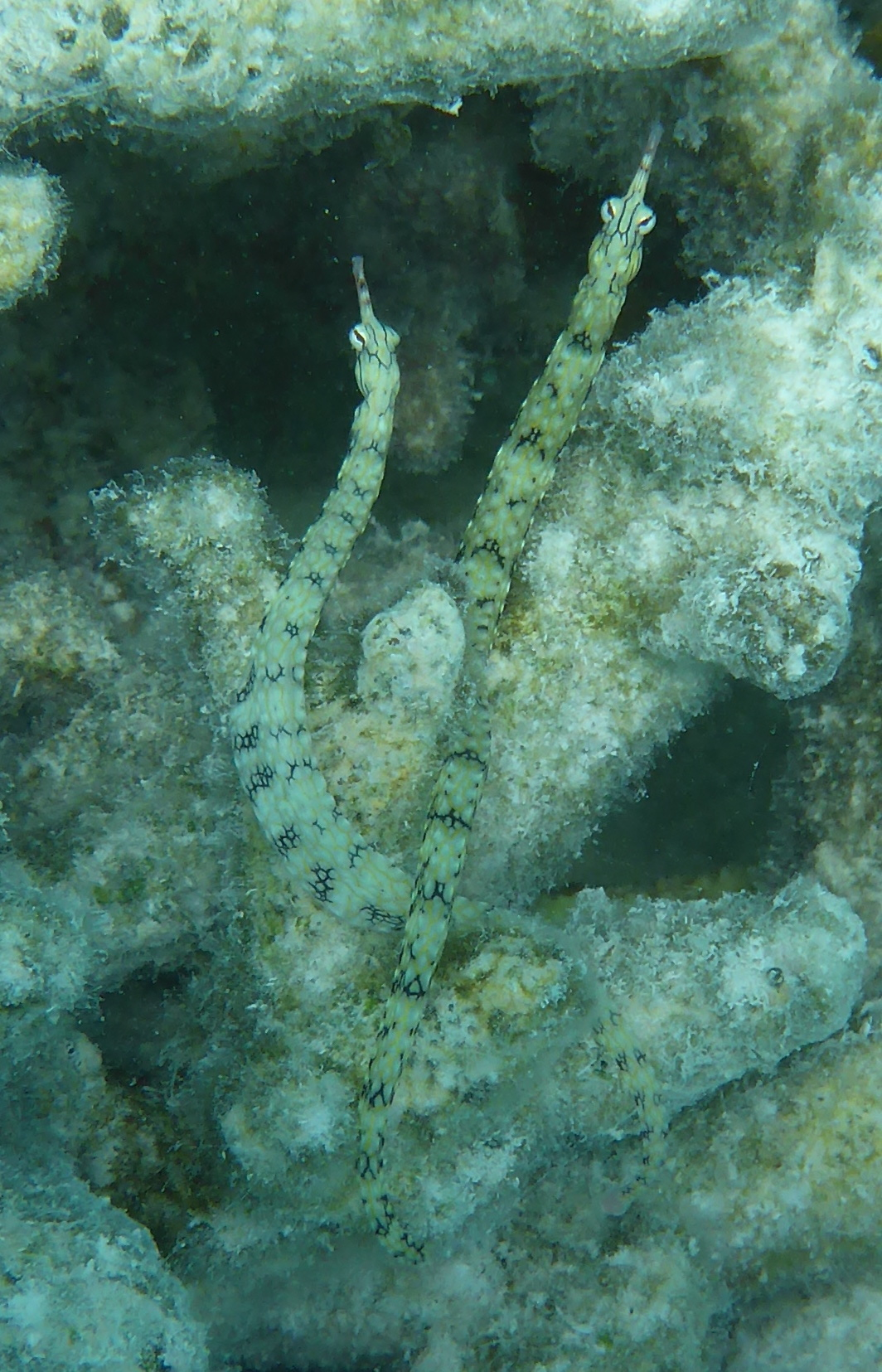
- Two specimens on Heron Reef, Queensland, Australia

Conservation status
- Least Concern (IUCN 3.1)

Scientific classification
- Kingdom: Animalia
- Phylum: Chordata
- Class: Actinopterygii
- Order: Syngnathiformes
- Family: Syngnathidae
- Genus: Corythoichthys
- Species: C. intestinalis

Binomial name
- Corythoichthys intestinalis (E. P. Ramsay, 1881)

Synonyms
- Syngnatus intestinalis Ramsay, 1881

= Scribbled pipefish =

Species of fish

Corythoichthys intestinalis, known commonly as the scribbled pipefish, is a species of marine fish in the family Syngnathidae. Other common names used include banded pipefish, Australian banded pipefish, Australian messmate pipefish and messmate pipefish.

The Scribbled pipefish is widespread throughout the tropical waters of the central Indo-Pacific region.

The Scribbled pipefish is a small fish and can reach a maximum size of 16 centimetres (6.3 in) total length.

== Biology ==
Adults occur in shallow sandy or mixed sand, rubble, or coral areas of reef flats and lagoons, also sometimes on seaward reefs, to depths of 20–68 metres (66–223 ft). The Scribbled pipefish is ovoviviparous. The male carries the eggs in a brood pouch which is found under the tail.
