= Uropterygius polystictus =

Scientific classification
- Kingdom: Animalia
- Phylum: Chordata
- Class: Actinopterygii
- Order: Anguilliformes
- Family: Muraenidae
- Genus: Uropterygius
- Species: U. polystictus

Binomial name
- Uropterygius polystictus G. S. Myers & Wade, 1941

Species of fish

Uropterygius polystictus is a moray eel found in coral reefs around Mexico and the Galapagos Islands. It is commonly known as the many-spotted moray, or the peppered moray.
