= Leonard Peter Schultz =

American ichthyologist

- Summer 1947
- Born: 1901; Albion, Michigan, U.S.
- Died: 1986 (aged 84–85)
- Education: University of Michigan; University of Washington; Albion College
- Scientific career
- Fields: Ichthyology
- Workplaces: United States National Museum; Florida Museum of Natural History
- Author abbrev. (zoology): Schultz

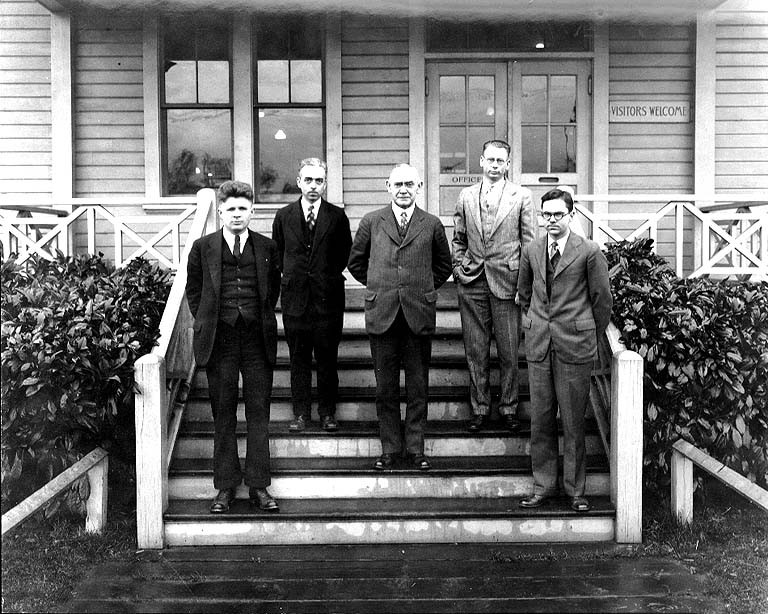
Fisheries Club at the University of Washington including Schultz, undated

Leonard Peter Schultz (1901–1986) was an American ichthyologist.

== Biography ==
Schultz was born in 1901, at Albion, Michigan. He received education on ichthyology at Albion College, in which he got his bachelor's degree, in 1924. In 1926, he got his master's degree from the University of Michigan, and then in 1932 from the University of Washington. From 1928 till 1936, he taught at the College of Fisheries at University of Washington. He was appointed as an assistant curator at the Division of Fishes of the United States National Museum. During the same year he joined Smithsonian Institution, where he remained till retirement in 1968. In 1938 he became a curator of the Division. While in retirement, he continued to work as a Research Associate of the Division of Fishes.

He was one of the scientists that was sent to work for the U.S. Navy, on Operation Crossroads, that was conducted at the Bikini Atoll in 1946. Aside from testing an atomic bomb during the operation, he also collected a variety of flora and fauna on the Marshall Islands. In 1947 he returned to the site which was a part of Bikini Resurvey, during which he found even more species for his collection.

Starting from 1958 till 1967, he spent much time studying shark attacks. It was a part of a study that was funded by the U.S. Navy, in order to reduce the incidents of attacks. He maintained an International Shark Attack File, that was used to record data about shark attacks on humans. The file is still used today for the same purpose it was designed, and is used by Florida Museum of Natural History.

During his life, Schultz wrote and published many articles and books. He used to serve as a zoologist emeritus at the Smithsonian Museum, until he died in 1986.

== Taxon described by him ==
- See Category:Taxa named by Leonard Peter Schultz

== Taxon named in his honor ==
Schultz's pipefish, Corythoichthys schultzi, is a pipefish of the family Syngnathidae.
